= Chordotonal organ =

Stretch receptor organs

Chordotonal organs are internal stretch receptor organs found only in insects and crustaceans. They are located at most joints and detect movement of joints, vibrations, and changes in body position using specialized groups of sensory units called scolopidia. The word was coined by Vitus Graber in 1882, though he interpreted them as being stretched between two points like a string, sensing vibrations through resonance.

== Structure ==
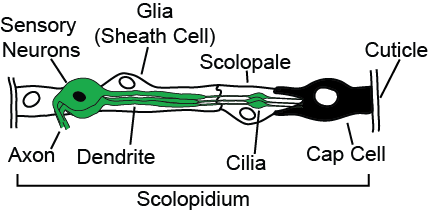
Diagram of the primary components of a chordotonal organ scolopidium

Chordotonal organs can be composed of a single scolopidium with only a single sensory, bipolar neuron (such as the tympanal ear of a notodontid moth), or up to several thousand scolopidia, each equipped with up to four sensory neurons (as in the mosquito Johnston's organ). The bipolar sensory neurons each have an apical dendritic structure with a cilium densely packed with microtubules and surrounded by two specialized cells, the scolopale cell and the attachment (cap) cell, plus a glial cell. Mechanically gated ion channels are located distal to the ciliary dilation, a characteristic part of the upper dendritic cilium. The cavity between the scolopale cell and the sensory neuron is filled with a specialized receptor lymph similar to the endolymph that surrounds the mechanosensory hair bundles of cochlear hair cells (high in potassium and low in sodium).

The dendritic cilia can have one of two major forms: in the mononematic form, the major connection between the attachment site and the cilium is a microtubule-rich attachment cell. The electron-dense extracellular material is small and localized mainly to the junction between the cilia and the attachment cell. The femoral chordotonal organ is mononematic. In contrast, in the amphinematic form, the extracellular material of the cap forms a dense, tubular sheath that surrounds the sensory cilium and extends all the way to the cuticle at the attachment site. In this form, the attachment cell contains both microtubules and actin-rich scolopale rods similar to those present in the scolopale cell. The Johnston's organ is an example of an amphinematic chordotonal organ. The functional significance of the morphological differences of the two forms is unknown, but may confer different viscoelastic properties on the sensory units.

== Functional diversity ==
In a chordotonal organ, individual sensory neurons can respond to different types of mechanosensory stimuli (for example, sound vs gravity), and those that respond to a particular stimulus can have different tuning properties (for example, tuned to different position of a joint). One way to generate these functional diversity is by having sensory neurons with different types of mechanosensory channels or intrinsic properties. For example, in Johnston's organ of Drosophila melanogaster, sensory neurons that detect sound may express nompC, an ion channel that belongs to the transient receptor potential (TRP) superfamily, while those that detect gravity may express another member of the TRP channel, painless. Another way to generate functional diversity is by having sensory neurons that are attached to the joint through different types of connections. For example, in the femoral chordotonal organ, as the joint flexes, the ligament's separate strands are pulled one after another causing different sensory neurons to activate at specific joint angles.

== Major chordotonal organs ==
=== Insects ===
==== Femoral chordotonal organ ====
A schematic of the subcompartments of the Femoral Chordotonal Organ in Drosophila Melanogaster.

The femoral chordotonal organ is located in the femur of the insect leg and it detects position, speed, acceleration, and vibration of the tibia relative to the femur. In Drosophila melanogaster, where it is possible to systematically analyze neuronal populations using genetic tools, the sensory neurons of the femoral chordotonal organ can be separated into at least three functionally and genetically distinct populations: the club, claw, and hook. The club neurons encode bi-directional movements and vibrations of the tibia, the claw neurons encode position of the tibia, and the hook neurons encode directional movements of the tibia. Information encoded by the femoral chordotonal organ is thought to be used during behaviors that require precise control of leg movements, such as walking and target reaching. The femoral chordotonal organ is thought to be functionally homologous to muscle spindles.

In the femoral chordotonal organ, the scolopidia are organized into groups called scoloparia. Scoloparia may be functionally distinct from one another, with separate scoloparia containing vibration-sensitive or position-sensitive sensory neurons. Drosophila melanogaster has three scoloparia.

==== Johnston's organ ====
The Johnston's organ is located in the pedicel (the second segment) of the insect antennae, and it detects the position and the movement of the flagellum (the third segment of the antennae) relative to the pedicel. Johnston's organ exists in nearly all orders of insects. In Drosophila melanogaster, in most mosquito species and some midge species, different subsets of Johnston's organ neurons are tuned to different amplitude and frequency of the movements allowing them to detect various stimuli including, sound, wind, gravity, wing beats, and touch.

In several species of Diptera, the Johnston's organ is sexually dimorphic. Males possess both greater numbers, greater diversity, and a more highly organized distribution of scolopidia. Some species of mosquitoes may possess as many as several thousand scolopidia. Males of these species likely use the Johnston's organ to identify potential mates.

==== Janet's organ ====
In addition to the Johnston's organ, antennae of Hymenoptera possess a second chordotonal organ, the Janet's organ, which detects flexion of the antennal joints.

Metathoracic Organ

In Drosophila melanogaster, the metathoacic organ is a bilateral chordotonal organ located in the thorax, adjacent to the metathoracic leg nerves. This organ is composed of about 11 cells per side and the function of this organ is not well understood.

Prothoracic Organ

The prothoracic organ is located in the junction between the head and the prothorax, where it detects mechanical strain generated between them during head movements. This organ is composed of about 60 neurons per side. These neurons provide proprioceptive feedback to motor circuits involved in posture control and head stabilization.

==== Subgenual organ ====
The subgenual organ is found in all insects except Diptera and Coleoptera. It is located in the proximal part of the tibia and detects high-frequency acoustic vibrations transmitted through the substrate as well as sound through air.

==== Tympanal organ ====
Tympanal organs are specialized hearing organs that have evolved in at least seven different orders of insects. They consist of a tympanal membrane backed by an air-filled space and are innervated by a chordotonal organ. Tympanal organs detect air-borne vibrations and are used to detect predators, prey, and potential mates and rivals. They can be found in a variety of locations on the body, including the abdomen, wing base, metathorax, and ventral prosternum.

Wheeler's Organ

In Drosophila melanogaster, the Wheeler's organ is a type of bilateral chordotonal organ in the first two abdominal sternites. It is named after the American entomologist William Morton Wheeler, who first described it in 1917. Wheeler's organ is composed of about 30 scolopidia per side. The function of Wheeler's organ is not fully understood.

==== Wing and halteres ====
There is a chordotonal organ located at the base of the wings in many insect orders, and, in Dipterans, there are also two chordotonal organs found at the base of the haltere. Their function is currently not well understood. In lacewings, a tympanal organ is located in the radius vein of the forewing and is thought to monitor ultrasound.

=== Crustaceans ===
==== Myochordotonal organ ====
In the order Decapoda, there are chordotonal organs located in the legs, antennules, antenna, chelipeds, and mandibles. Each leg joint also contains a chordotonal organ. Similar to the antennal and leg chordotonal organs in insects, the leg chordotonal organs in crustaceans are sensitive to both proprioceptive and auditory information, including airborne and substrate-borne vibrations. Myochordotonal organs are also called Barth's myochordotonal organs and were first studied by Barth in 1934.

== See also ==
- Femoral chordotonal organ
- Scolopidia
- Crista acustica
- Johnston's organ
- Subgenual organ
- Tympanal organ
