= Crista acustica =

Part of the hearing organ in some insects

Crista acustica (also Siebold's organ, or crista acoustica) is a part of the hearing organ (tibial organ) in some insects (e.g. grasshoppers, crickets, katydids). It is a collection of sensory cells that form a crest (hence the name) on top of the hollow tube (the foreleg trachea) behind the hearing membrane (tympanum) on the legs of the insect.

The crista acustica is a transition from the intermedia organ (from the midline to the periphery), together which compose the tibial hearing organ (as opposed to the tympanal hearing organ).

The crista acustica is one of three fiddle-string-like organs or chordotonal organ in insects: the others are the intermediate organ and the supratympanal organ/subgenual organ. These chordotonal organs are actually collections of sensory cells sensitive to vibration (these cells are called scolopidia cells). Their cells are attached to the tube in the legs of the insects (the trachea, "trah-key-ah"). So when the tube vibrates, the cells vibrate. In the crista acustica, it turns out that different scolopidia cells are sensitive to different vibrations depending on the frequency of the vibration. Since these organs are sensitive to vibrations (due to changes in pressure. It turns out the cells closest to midline are the largest and sensitive to the lowest frequency (low frequencies having the largest wavelength), and the cells further out (distal) are smaller and sensitive to higher frequencies (since high frequencies have shorter wavelengths). This orderly arrangement of sensory cells gives the insect the ability to discriminate frequencies, much like the inner ear of mammals.

== See also ==
- Scolopidia
- Chordotonal organ
