= Christopher Johnston (anatomist) =

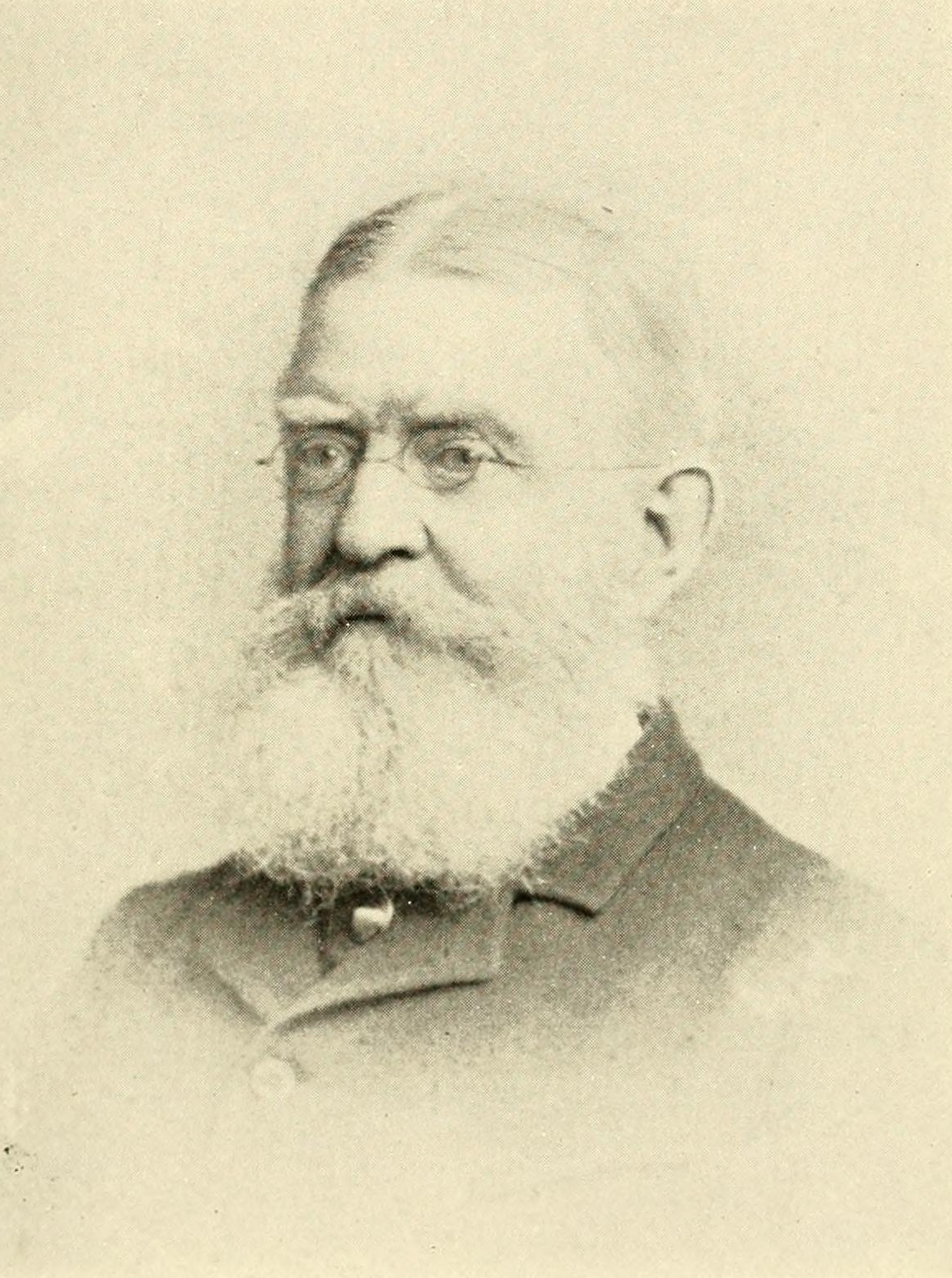

Christopher Johnston (September 27, 1822–October 12, 1891) was an American surgeon and professor of anatomy. Among his contributions was the anatomical description of the antenna of mosquitoes and an organ that detects vibration that is now known as Johnston's organ. His son Christopher Johnston (1856–1914) became an eminent Assyriologist.

== Life and work ==
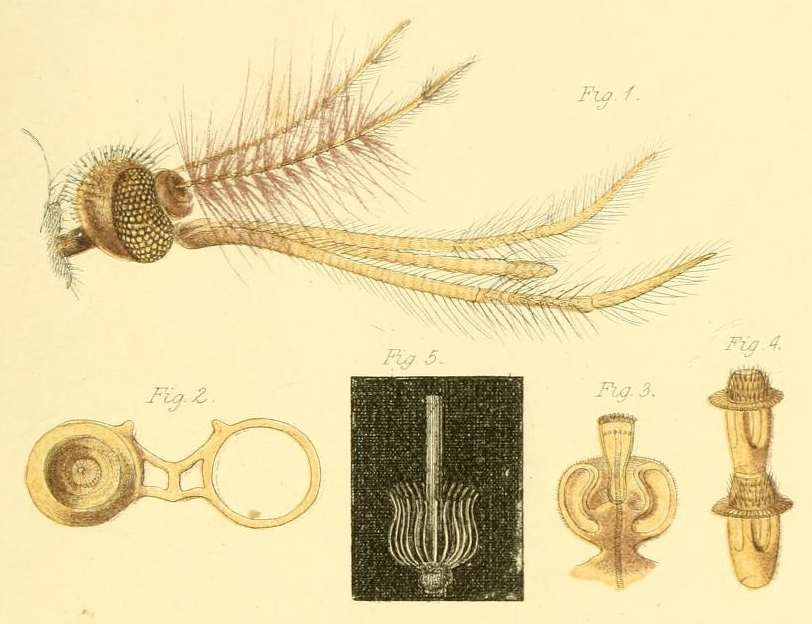
The hearing organ of mosquitoes, 1855

Johnston was born in Baltimore to Christopher and Elizabeth Gates, daughter of Maj. Lemuel Gates. His paternal grandfather had moved from Scotland to Baltimore in 1766. When his father died in 1835, he was adopted by an aunt Mariah S. Johnston. He was educated at St. Mary's College in Baltimore and later studied medicine under Dr. John Buckler. He received an MD in 1844 from Maryland University. Along with Charles Frick, David Stewart and Elisha W. Theobald he was involved in founding the Maryland Medical Institute in 1847. He travelled to Europe in 1853 and worked in hospitals in Paris and Vienna and on his return he became a lecturer in experimental physiology at the University of Maryland. He also served as a curator of the university museum. In 1857 he became a professor of anatomy at the Baltimore College of Dental Surgery. He attended to the wounded in the Battle of Gettysburg. In 1864 he became a professor of anatomy and physiology at the University of Maryland and in 1869 he succeeded Nathan R. Smith as chair of surgery. Johnston was noted for being a patient microscopist, experimenter, and a skilled artist. In 1881 he published his studies on the antennae of Culex mosquitoes. He was involved in the founding of the Maryland Academy of Sciences. In 1873 he was successful in removing the complete upper jaw of a patient. He was a consulting surgeon for Johns Hopkins hospital devised instruments for surgery and bequeathed his instruments to Johns Hopkins University.

Johnston wrote mainly on medical topics, including an entry on plastic surgery for Ashhurst's Encyclopedia. His most influential work was on a study of the antennae of mosquitoes and the auditory organ on it which is now known as Johnston's organ. A fossil sauropod genus that he suggested the name Astrodon for on the basis of a tooth was described as Astrodon johnstoni by Joseph Leidy.

Johnston married Sallie, daughter of Benjamin Price Smith. and they had four sons including Christopher Johnston (b. 1856) who became a professor of oriental history at Johns Hopkins University. He died from diphtheria acquired from a surgery patient.
