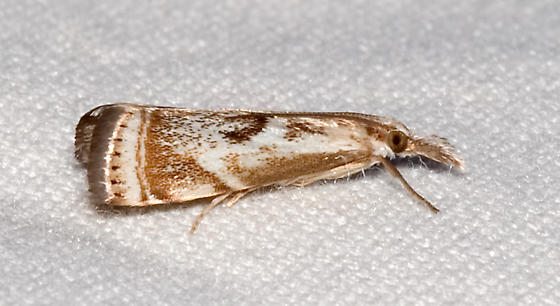

Scientific classification
- Kingdom: Animalia
- Phylum: Arthropoda
- Clade: Pancrustacea
- Class: Insecta
- Order: Lepidoptera
- Family: Crambidae
- Genus: Microcrambus
- Species: M. elegans

Binomial name
- Microcrambus elegans (Clemens, 1860)

Synonyms
- Crambus elegans Clemens, 1860; Crambus terminellus Zeller, 1863; Microcrambus terminellus

= Microcrambus elegans =

Species of moth

Microcrambus elegans, the elegant grass-veneer moth, is a moth of the family Crambidae which was first described in 1860 by James Brackenridge Clemens. Adults are on wing from June to August in the north and from March to October in the south. There is one generation per year in the north and multiple in the south.

== Description ==
M. elegans has silvery-white wings which are shaded with brown in some areas. Adults rest with their wings tightly folded, forming a tube-like shape. From a top-down perspective, they have a "Halloween-mask" like pattern, with two triangular "eyes" and a frowning down-curved "mouth". Another characteristic trait of the species is the seven black dots at the lowermost edge of the forewings. Their wingspan is 12–15 mm. Their antennae are threadlike and slender. The sensory tympanal organs attached to the mouth are long and hairy, creating a snout-like appearance which is common in the Crambinae subfamily.

== Range and Habitat ==
M. elegans is found from Ontario, Quebec and Maine to Florida, west to Texas, north to Kansas and Illinois. They are most commonly observed in grassy areas.

== Ecology ==
The larvae feed on grasses in the family Poaceae.
