= Microcrambus psythiella =

Scientific classification
- Kingdom: Animalia
- Phylum: Arthropoda
- Clade: Pancrustacea
- Class: Insecta
- Order: Lepidoptera
- Family: Crambidae
- Genus: Microcrambus
- Species: M. psythiella

Binomial name
- Microcrambus psythiella (Schaus, 1913)

Synonyms
- Culladia psythiella Schaus, 1913

Species of moth

Microcrambus psythiella is a moth in the family Crambidae. It was described by William Schaus in 1913. It is found in Costa Rica.
