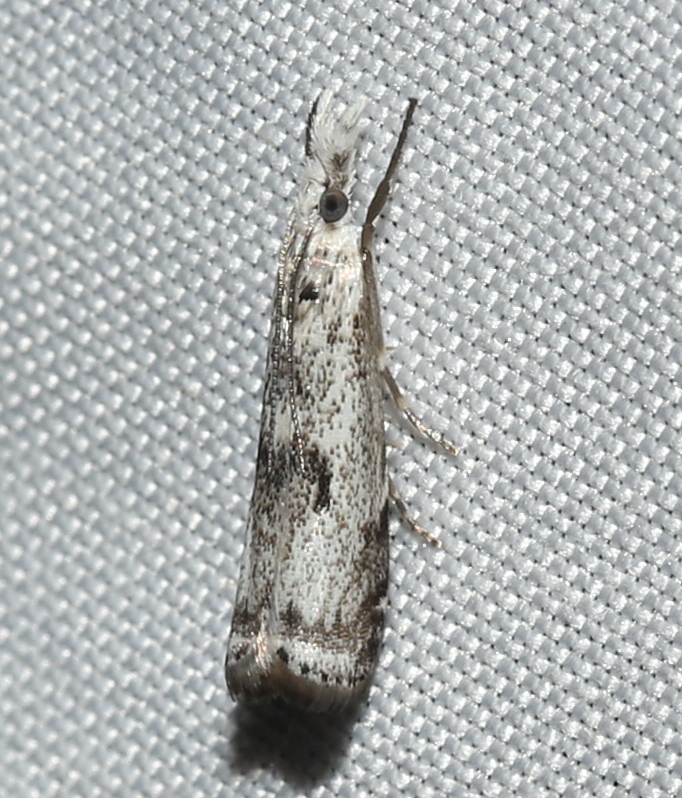

Scientific classification
- Kingdom: Animalia
- Phylum: Arthropoda
- Clade: Pancrustacea
- Class: Insecta
- Order: Lepidoptera
- Family: Crambidae
- Genus: Microcrambus
- Species: M. minor

Binomial name
- Microcrambus minor Forbes, 1920

Synonyms
- Crambus immunellus r. minor Forbes, 1920

= Microcrambus minor =

Species of moth

Microcrambus minor is a moth in the family Crambidae. It was described by William Trowbridge Merrifield Forbes in 1920. It is found in North America, where it has been recorded from Alabama, Florida, Illinois, Indiana, Manitoba, Maryland, Massachusetts, Minnesota, Mississippi, New Hampshire, New York, North Carolina, Ohio, Oklahoma, Ontario, Pennsylvania, Quebec, South Carolina, Tennessee, West Virginia, Virginia, and Wisconsin.
