= Microcrambus pusionellus =

Scientific classification
- Kingdom: Animalia
- Phylum: Arthropoda
- Clade: Pancrustacea
- Class: Insecta
- Order: Lepidoptera
- Family: Crambidae
- Genus: Microcrambus
- Species: M. pusionellus

Binomial name
- Microcrambus pusionellus (Zeller, 1863)

Synonyms
- Crambus pusionellus Zeller, 1863; Argyria pustulella Walker, 1866; Crambus elphegellus Schaus, 1922

Species of moth

Microcrambus pusionellus is a moth in the family Crambidae. It was described by Zeller in 1863. It is found in Venezuela.
