= Microcrambus asymmetricus =

Scientific classification
- Kingdom: Animalia
- Phylum: Arthropoda
- Clade: Pancrustacea
- Class: Insecta
- Order: Lepidoptera
- Family: Crambidae
- Genus: Microcrambus
- Species: M. asymmetricus

Binomial name
- Microcrambus asymmetricus Błeszyński, 1967

Species of moth

Microcrambus asymmetricus is a moth in the family Crambidae. It was described by Stanisław Błeszyński in 1967. It is found in Bolivia.
