= Christopher Johnston (Assyriologist) =

American physician and historian (1856–1914)

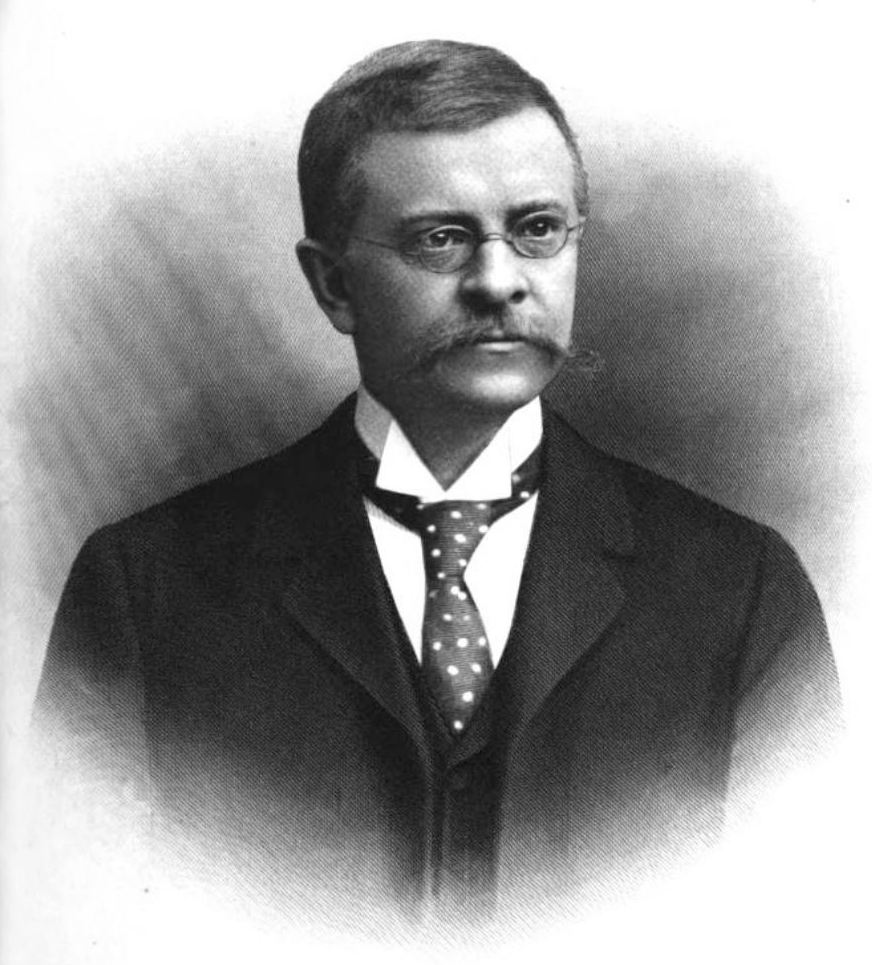
- Born: December 8, 1856; Baltimore, Maryland
- Died: June 26, 1914 (aged 57); Baltimore, Maryland
- Education: University of Virginia; University of Maryland; Johns Hopkins University
- Occupations: Physician, Assyriologist
- Spouse: Madeline T. Tilghman (m. 1897)
- Children: 2

Signature
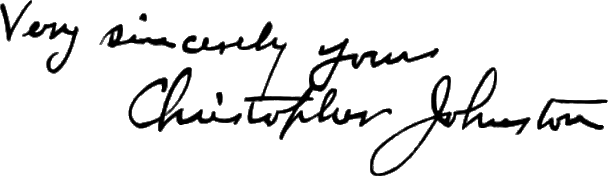

Christopher Johnston (December 8, 1856 (Note: His obituary in The New York Times cites his birth year as 1858, whereas a genealogy article he penned in the William and Mary Quarterly cites it as 1856.) – June 26, 1914) was an American physician and Assyriologist, a scholar of ancient Mesopotamia.

== Personal life ==
He was born on December 8, 1856, in Baltimore, the son of the physician Christopher Johnston (1822-1891), a professor of surgery at the University of Maryland and the discoverer of Johnston's organ, and Sarah Lucretia Clay (1835-1879). Johnston married Madeline T. Tilghman on June 2, 1897, and had a son, Benamin Johnston, and a daughter, Eliza Gates Johnston, who died young.

Johnston died at his home in Baltimore on June 26, 1914.

== Studies and career ==
Johnston studied at the University of Virginia, where he earned three degrees: a B. Litt. in 1876, a B.A. 1878, and an M.A. in 1879. He graduated from the medical department of the University of Maryland in 1880, practiced medicine until 1888 in Baltimore (while concurrently studying various languages), then entered Johns Hopkins to study Assyriology and Semitics, taking the degree of Ph.D. in 1894. Johnston continued on to become a Professor of Oriental History and Archaeology at Hopkins. He published Epistolary Literature of the Assyrians and Babylonians (1896) and edited Ancient Empires of the East (1906). He was also responsible for writing the New International Encyclopedia's chapter concerning Egyptology.

== Works ==
- The Epistolary Literature of the Assyrians and Babylonians. Baltimore: Johns Hopkins University. 1898. (1894 Ph.D. dissertation)
- The book of the prophet Jeremiah: critical edition of the Hebrew text. Baltimore: The Johns Hopkins Press. 1895. (notes by Carl Heinrich Cornill)
