= Microcrambus cyllarus =

Scientific classification
- Kingdom: Animalia
- Phylum: Arthropoda
- Clade: Pancrustacea
- Class: Insecta
- Order: Lepidoptera
- Family: Crambidae
- Genus: Microcrambus
- Species: M. cyllarus

Binomial name
- Microcrambus cyllarus Błeszyński, 1963

Species of moth

Microcrambus cyllarus is a moth in the family Crambidae. It was described by Stanisław Błeszyński in 1963. It is found in Brazil.
