= Microcrambus matheri =

Scientific classification
- Kingdom: Animalia
- Phylum: Arthropoda
- Clade: Pancrustacea
- Class: Insecta
- Order: Lepidoptera
- Family: Crambidae
- Genus: Microcrambus
- Species: M. matheri

Binomial name
- Microcrambus matheri Klots, 1968

Species of moth

Microcrambus matheri is a moth in the family Crambidae. It was described by Alexander Barrett Klots in 1968. It has been recorded from the US states of Florida, Georgia, South Carolina and West Virginia.

The wingspan is about 15 mm. Adults have been recorded on wing from June to October.
