= Microcrambus agnesiella =

Scientific classification
- Kingdom: Animalia
- Phylum: Arthropoda
- Clade: Pancrustacea
- Class: Insecta
- Order: Lepidoptera
- Family: Crambidae
- Genus: Microcrambus
- Species: M. agnesiella

Binomial name
- Microcrambus agnesiella (Dyar, 1914)

Synonyms
- Crambus agnesiella Dyar, 1914

Species of moth

Microcrambus agnesiella is a moth in the family Crambidae. It was described by Harrison Gray Dyar Jr. in 1914. It is found in Panama.
