= Scolopidia =

Unit of insect mechanoreceptor organs

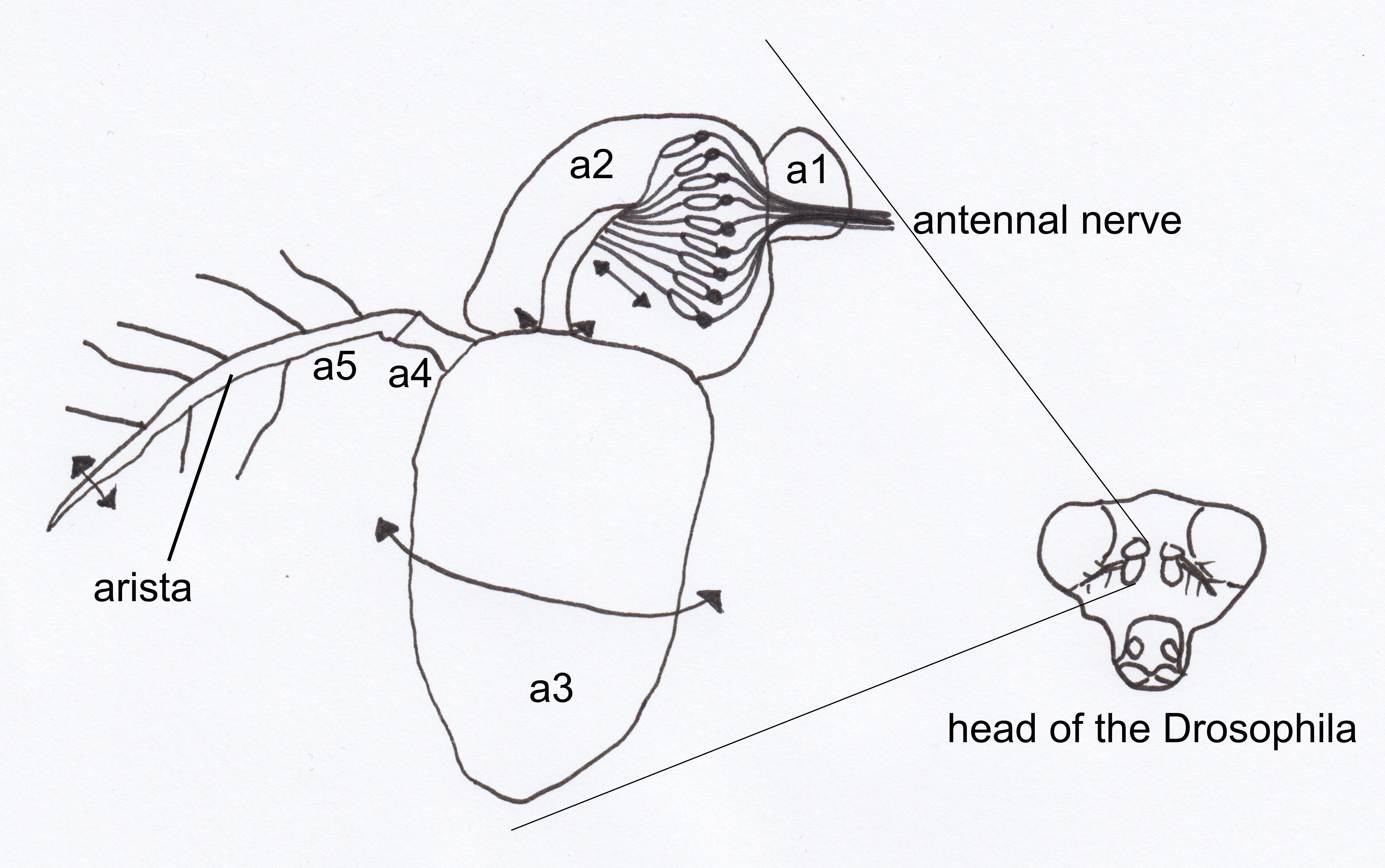
Left: Frontal view of a small fruit fly antenna. The scolopidia in the second segment (a2, pedicel) with their neurons are illustrated. Sound energy absorption leads to vibration of the arista and rotation of the third segment a3. The rotation leads to deformation of the scolopidia, leading to activation or deactivation. Right: The antenna located on the head of the fruit fly.

A scolopidium (historically, scolopophore) is the fundamental unit of a mechanoreceptor organ in insects. Each scolopidium is built from four cell types: a ligament cell, one or more bipolar sensory neurons, a scolopale cell, and a cap cell (also called the attachment cell). The three non-neuronal cells are supporting cells that hold the structure together and create the right environment for the neuron to fire.

The general term referring to these vibrational sense organs is the chordotonal organs, with the scolopidia usually lying just under the exoskeleton. Scolopidia may be located within:

- the subgenual organ: located in the lower part of the legs; primarily senses vibrations in underlying substrate
- the crista acustica: collection of individually tuned scolopidia able to discriminate frequencies
- Johnston's organ: located in the antennae; senses motion of an antenna relative to the insect's body

There are many types of scolopidia, depending on the sense organ in which they belong.

== Cellular composition ==
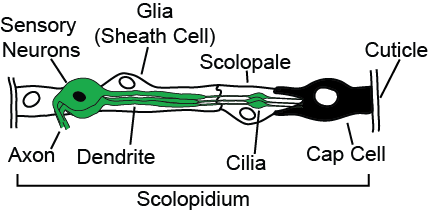
A diagram showing the cellular composition of a scolopidium.

=== Sensory neuron ===
The sensory neuron is the cell that detects mechanical forces. It sends a long projection (a dendrite) toward the surface of the body and a second projection (an axon) toward the brain or nerve cord. The tip of the dendrite ends in a structure called a cilium, a hair-like projection built from a ring of nine paired microtubules. Unlike the cilia that beat back and forth on the surface of cells in the lungs or airway, this cilium is immobile and acts instead as a sensitive mechanical antenna: when it bends or stretches, channels in its membrane open and generate an electrical signal.

Most scolopidia contain between one and three sensory neurons. In the fruit fly Drosophila melanogaster, for example, the sensory organs of the larval body wall each contain a single neuron, while most scolopidia in the Johnston's organ of the adult antenna contain two, and a small fraction contain three.

=== Scolopale cell ===
The scolopale cell wraps around the upper part of the sensory neuron's dendrite, sealing off a small fluid-filled pocket called the scolopale space. The fluid inside this pocket is thought to be rich in potassium and low in sodium—the same environment as the fluid inside the cochlea of the vertebrate inner ear. This specialized ionic environment is important for efficient electrical signaling by the neuron.

The scolopale cell is reinforced internally by a set of rigid rods. Bundles of protein filaments (actin) arrange in a cage around the fluid space. These scolopale rods keep the pocket from collapsing and help transmit mechanical forces accurately to the neuron inside. When genes controlling the formation of these rods are disrupted, flies become deaf and lose their ability to sense limb position.

The scolopale cell also produces a small extracellular structure called the dendritic cap, which physically connects the tip of the neuron's cilium to the cap cell above it. Without this cap, mechanical forces cannot be passed on to the neuron effectively.

=== Cap cell (attachment cell) ===
The cap cell sits at the top of the scolopidium and anchors it to the insect's cuticle (its exoskeleton) or to a joint membrane. It is packed with stiff microtubules running along its length that resist being compressed or stretched. The cap cell acts as the upper attachment point—it is the end of the scolopidium that is pulled or pushed when the surrounding body part moves.

=== Ligament cell ===
The ligament cell anchors the opposite end of the scolopidium to the body wall on the other side. Together, the cap cell and the ligament cell ensure that the scolopidium is stretched between two separate structures, such as two adjacent leg segments, so that when those structures move relative to each other, the scolopidium is squeezed or pulled and the neuron inside fires. Like the cap cell, the ligament cell is packed with microtubules aligned along the axis of pull.

== Mechanosensation ==
=== Function ===
Scolopidia are sensitive to mechanical disturbances, such as sound (vibrations of the air) or substrate vibrations (vibrations of surrounding solid material), depending on the structure of the overall sense organ in which they reside. While many species using mechanoreceptors to transduce and locate sources of sound, functions such as detecting gravitational forces or airflow have also been demonstrated. Airflow direction detection by mechanoreceptors appears to be key in the navigational behavior of flying insects, particularly in environments with slow or absent visual feedback.

A single individual may possess scolopidia that are capable of sensing a range of low to high frequencies. This enables a single organ to serve multiple functions, ranging from gravity sensing to acoustic sensing.

=== Physiology ===
Scolopidia ultimately convert mechanical vibration into a nerve impulse, which is sent on to higher ganglion where the information is combined and/or processed into a resultant behavior. Mechanosensory information received by scolopidia is typically transduced faster than visual feedback, due to the physical mechanism of activating a neural impulse. Sensory neurons coupled to scolopidia are also of larger diameter, increasing conduction rate.

In some moths, honeybees, and fruit flies, projections from scolopidia in Johnston's organs project directly to regions in the brain.

== Types of scolopidia ==
Classification and nomenclature of cells is not always uniform.

Scolopidia may be classified by their location:

- subintegumental: distal end (cap end) is contained within the body wall of the insect
- integumental: distal end is free, exterior to the insect

Classification may also be performed based on the ciliary processes of the cells:

- ciliary structures expand and constrict near the attachment cell
- ciliary structures display consistent expansion throughout
- one cilium expands distally, while the other two are unmodified

Scolopidia sensory cells may also be grouped by structure, location, and number of sensory cells (e.g. two, or three).

=== Locations ===
Integumental scolopidia are found in the subgenual organ (also known as the supratympanal organ), subintegumental scolopidia are found in the crista acustica and the intermediate organ.

The subgenual organ ('organ below the knee') is found in all insects legs, and the probably an evolutionary artifact of prior insect body-types which used their legs to detect vibrations from the substrate (viz., treehoppers). The intermediate organ and the crista acustica, on the other hand, are only found where there is a tympanum, such as on the front legs of insects.

== Number diversity ==
Swarming insects must detect the wing sounds of conspecifics in order to identify potential mates, and do so by using vibrations present in the air. The antennal Johnston's organ in swarming Diptera (e.g. midges and mosquitos) may contain tens of thousands of scolopophorous sense cells, which are grouped by two's or three's into individual scolopidia. The high number of scolopidia in Johnston's organ provides an evolutionary advantage in acoustically identifying and locating mates.

Non-swarming insects accordingly possess less scolopidia. Certain Hemiptera and Diptera may possess as few as 25 scolopidia.

== See also ==
- Chordotonal organ
- Crista acustica
- Subgenual organ
- Johnston's organ
- Mechanosensation
