= Microcrambus paucipunctellus =

Scientific classification
- Kingdom: Animalia
- Phylum: Arthropoda
- Clade: Pancrustacea
- Class: Insecta
- Order: Lepidoptera
- Family: Crambidae
- Genus: Microcrambus
- Species: M. paucipunctellus

Binomial name
- Microcrambus paucipunctellus (Schaus, 1922)

Synonyms
- Crambus paucipunctellus Schaus, 1922

Species of moth

Microcrambus paucipunctellus is a moth in the family Crambidae. It was described by William Schaus in 1922. It is found in Brazil.
