= Microcrambus polingi =

Scientific classification
- Kingdom: Animalia
- Phylum: Arthropoda
- Clade: Pancrustacea
- Class: Insecta
- Order: Lepidoptera
- Family: Crambidae
- Genus: Microcrambus
- Species: M. polingi

Binomial name
- Microcrambus polingi (Kearfott, 1908)

Synonyms
- Crambus polingi Kearfott, 1908

Species of moth

Microcrambus polingi is a moth in the family Crambidae. It was described by William D. Kearfott in 1908. It is found in the US state of Arizona.
