= Microcrambus mercury =

Scientific classification
- Kingdom: Animalia
- Phylum: Arthropoda
- Clade: Pancrustacea
- Class: Insecta
- Order: Lepidoptera
- Family: Crambidae
- Genus: Microcrambus
- Species: M. mercury

Binomial name
- Microcrambus mercury Bleszynski, 1963

Species of moth

Microcrambus mercury is a moth in the family Crambidae. It was described by Stanisław Błeszyński in 1963. It is found in Colombia.
