= Microcrambus niphosella =

Scientific classification
- Kingdom: Animalia
- Phylum: Arthropoda
- Clade: Pancrustacea
- Class: Insecta
- Order: Lepidoptera
- Family: Crambidae
- Genus: Microcrambus
- Species: M. niphosella

Binomial name
- Microcrambus niphosella (Hampson, 1908)

Synonyms
- Culladia niphosella Hampson, 1908

Species of moth

Microcrambus niphosella is a moth in the family Crambidae. It was described by George Hampson in 1908. It is found in Trinidad.
