= Microcrambus expansellus =

Scientific classification
- Kingdom: Animalia
- Phylum: Arthropoda
- Clade: Pancrustacea
- Class: Insecta
- Order: Lepidoptera
- Family: Crambidae
- Genus: Microcrambus
- Species: M. expansellus

Binomial name
- Microcrambus expansellus (Zeller, 1877)

Synonyms
- Crambus expansellus Zeller, 1877

Species of moth

Microcrambus expansellus is a moth in the family Crambidae. It was described by Zeller in 1877. It is found in Panama.
