= Microcrambus atristrigellus =

Scientific classification
- Kingdom: Animalia
- Phylum: Arthropoda
- Clade: Pancrustacea
- Class: Insecta
- Order: Lepidoptera
- Family: Crambidae
- Genus: Microcrambus
- Species: M. atristrigellus

Binomial name
- Microcrambus atristrigellus (Hampson, 1919)

Synonyms
- Crambus atristrigellus Hampson, 1919

Species of moth

Microcrambus atristrigellus is a moth in the family Crambidae. It was described by George Hampson in 1919. It is found in Jamaica.
