= Microcrambus grisetinctellus =

Scientific classification
- Kingdom: Animalia
- Phylum: Arthropoda
- Clade: Pancrustacea
- Class: Insecta
- Order: Lepidoptera
- Family: Crambidae
- Genus: Microcrambus
- Species: M. grisetinctellus

Binomial name
- Microcrambus grisetinctellus (Hampson, 1896)

Synonyms
- Crambus grisetinctellus Hampson, 1896

Species of moth

Microcrambus grisetinctellus is a moth in the family Crambidae. It was described by George Hampson in 1896. It is found in Brazil.
