= Zabalius apicalis =

Scientific classification
- Domain: Eukaryota
- Kingdom: Animalia
- Phylum: Arthropoda
- Class: Insecta
- Order: Orthoptera
- Suborder: Ensifera
- Family: Tettigoniidae
- Subfamily: Pseudophyllinae
- Genus: Zabalius
- Species: Z. apicalis

Binomial name
- Zabalius apicalis (Bolívar, 1886)

Species of cricket-like animal

Zabalius apicalis is a species of katydid, native to Africa.

The animal lays eggs in water with an incubation period of 18 days, Males moult six times and reach adulthood at about 55 days, and females moult seven times and reach adulthood at about 65 days

Embryos take longer to develop the hotter they are and do not develop above 30.5 degrees Celsius (86.9 Fahrenheit)
