= Microcrambus retusellus =

Scientific classification
- Kingdom: Animalia
- Phylum: Arthropoda
- Clade: Pancrustacea
- Class: Insecta
- Order: Lepidoptera
- Family: Crambidae
- Genus: Microcrambus
- Species: M. retusellus

Binomial name
- Microcrambus retusellus (Schaus, 1913)

Synonyms
- Crambus retusellus Schaus, 1913; Microcrambus zephyrus Bleszynski, 1963; Microcrambus zephyrellus Munroe, 1995

Species of moth

Microcrambus retusellus is a moth in the family Crambidae. It was described by Schaus in 1913. It is found in Costa Rica.
