= Microcrambus kimballi =

Scientific classification
- Kingdom: Animalia
- Phylum: Arthropoda
- Clade: Pancrustacea
- Class: Insecta
- Order: Lepidoptera
- Family: Crambidae
- Genus: Microcrambus
- Species: M. kimballi

Binomial name
- Microcrambus kimballi Klots, 1968

Species of moth

Microcrambus kimballi is a moth in the family Crambidae. It was described by Alexander Barrett Klots in 1968. It has been recorded from the US states of Alabama, Florida, Maryland, Mississippi, North Carolina, Ohio, South Carolina, Tennessee and Texas.

The wingspan is 14 mm. Adults are on wing from February to November.
