= Microcrambus chrysoporellus =

Scientific classification
- Kingdom: Animalia
- Phylum: Arthropoda
- Clade: Pancrustacea
- Class: Insecta
- Order: Lepidoptera
- Family: Crambidae
- Genus: Microcrambus
- Species: M. chrysoporellus

Binomial name
- Microcrambus chrysoporellus (Hampson, 1895)

Synonyms
- Crambus chrysoporellus Hampson, 1895

Species of moth

Microcrambus chrysoporellus is a moth in the family Crambidae. It was described by George Hampson in 1895. It is found in Grenada.
