= Chironomus annularius =

Scientific classification
- Kingdom: Animalia
- Phylum: Arthropoda
- Clade: Pancrustacea
- Class: Insecta
- Order: Diptera
- Family: Chironomidae
- Genus: Chironomus
- Species: C. annularius

Binomial name
- Chironomus annularius Kieffer, 1926

Species of fly

Chironomus annularius (commonly known as bayflies, muffleheads, or muckleheads) is a species of non-biting midge in the family Chironomidae. It is usually found in regions with bodies of fresh water but can be found in almost every environment. It tends to form "hotspots" around specific areas. The species is distinguished by the size of its chromosomes and the lack of a proboscis.

== Description ==
C. annularius has three defining characteristics in terms of physical structural. The first is the Johnston's Organ, a sensory organ embedded in its antennae. This sensory organ is used to detect other individuals of the same species and possible mates. The range of detection is no more than a centimeter; this small range requires the species to try mating on even the slightest hint that there's a female nearby.

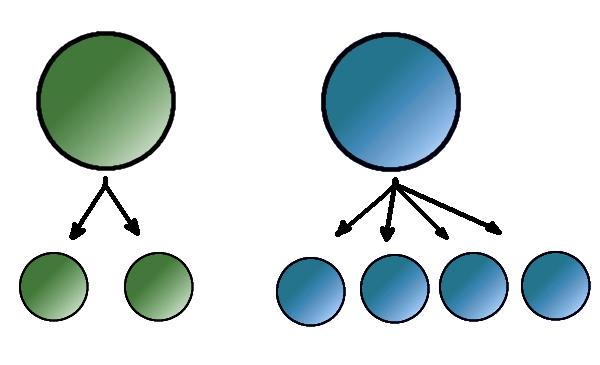
Green/Left = Higher Physical Fitness Blue/Right = Higher Reproductive Fitness

Additionally, the species are characterized by a difference in size between large and small males. The larger males have higher longevity and can fly for more extended periods of time. This allows larger individuals to search for food and resources and succeed more in physical fitness. The smaller males are at a disadvantage physically, but they can more easily latch onto females in the air to mate. Thus, the reproductive fitness of smaller individuals is also high. Medium-sized males don't experience any of this benefit, and thus are not as populous.

Lastly, there is a difference in wing spans and frequency of sound between males and females. This is due to the inverse relationship between the sound that the wing produces and wing length. For example, C. annularius males have shorter wingspans, which causes them to produce higher frequency sounds (434±27.8 Hz). On the other hand, females have longer wingspans, which causes them to produce lower frequency sounds (240±17.2 Hz). This allows males to differentiate between other males and possible mates.

== Distribution ==
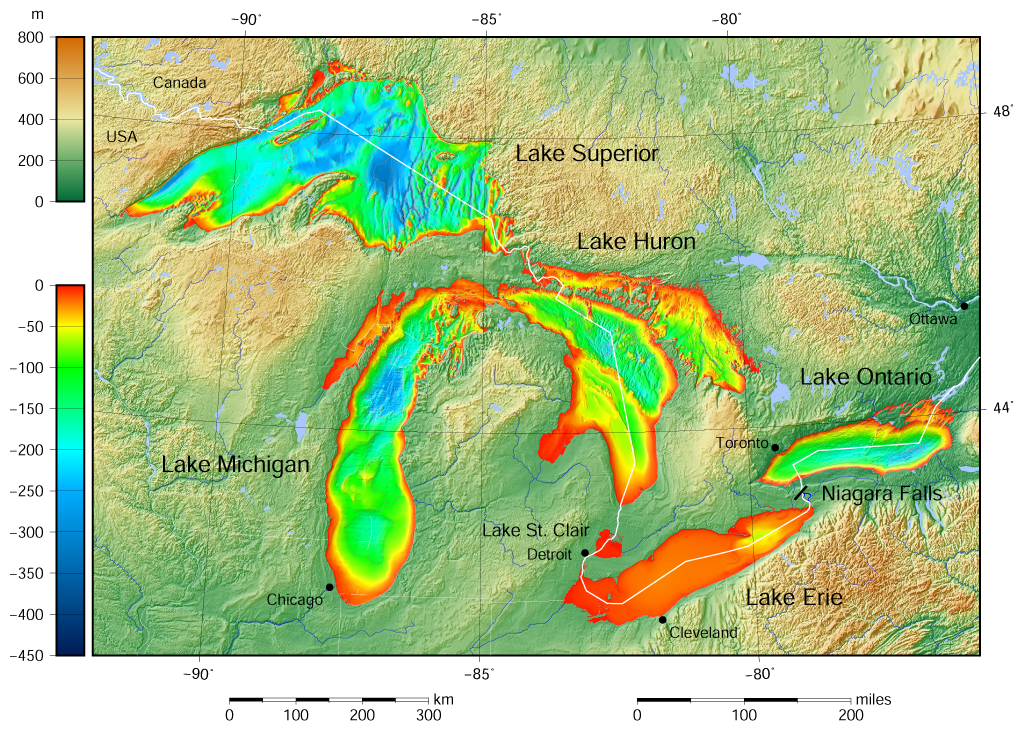
Great Lakes

This species exists in every climate except the harsh heat of some deserts. There have been notable sightings of their swarming behavior in the Great Lakes, the swamps of Florida, Lake Ijssel of Netherlands, and multiple lakes and rivers across England. The males are known for their swarming behavior for both physical fitness and reproductive fitness reasons. This swarming causes individuals to arrange themselves more densely in certain hotspots, increasing the population density around these select areas and decreasing the population density elsewhere.

== Habitat ==
=== General habitat ===
C. annularius, like many of its similar family members, gravitate towards habitats that have open bodies of fresh water and an abundance of plant life and decay. The exact specifications of these factors that go into selecting an optimal habitat is still very much unknown. However, research has been able to parse a few correlational factors and conditions.

=== Environmental conditions ===
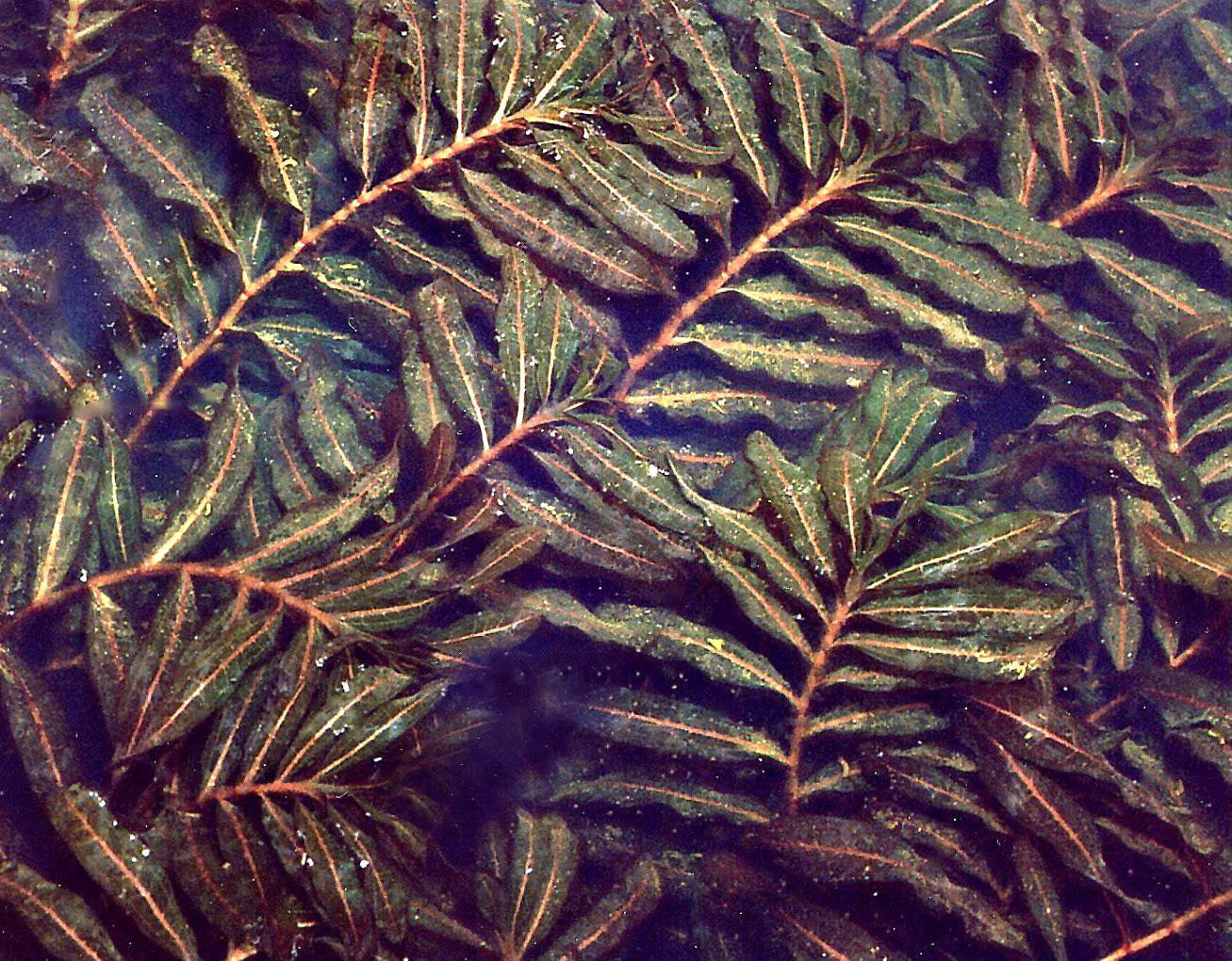
Potamogeton Crispus

The species prefer bodies of water with high populations of macrophytes, or plants that grow in or around water. Macrophytes provide the flies with a place to give birth, an adequate supply of food, and shelter. The two most popular macrophyte species that the C. annularius are inclined towards are the Potamogeton crispus and Potamogeton lucens. Added on to this, C. annularius stay on the outskirts of freshwater ecosystems in order to avoid areas of open water. By staying near vegetation and away from open water, they are able to decrease their chances of being attacked by predators. Environmental conditions that are still under research are vegetation height and flooding.

=== Chemical factors ===
The pH range of the water can extend between 6.0 and 9.0. This is common for insects but prevents many aquatic vertebrate predators from living in the same water. Added on to this, the fly is resistant to a certain degree to levels of salinity. They have been observed to survive in bodies of water with salinity ranges pushing 2-3 ppt. Lastly, oxygen levels can reach as low as 4% in bodies of water before it becomes a threat. Temperature also has a direct and indirect role on the survivability; Temperature directly increase the development rate of the species in its egg and larval phases, but also indirectly increases levels of food and resources.

== Taxonomy ==
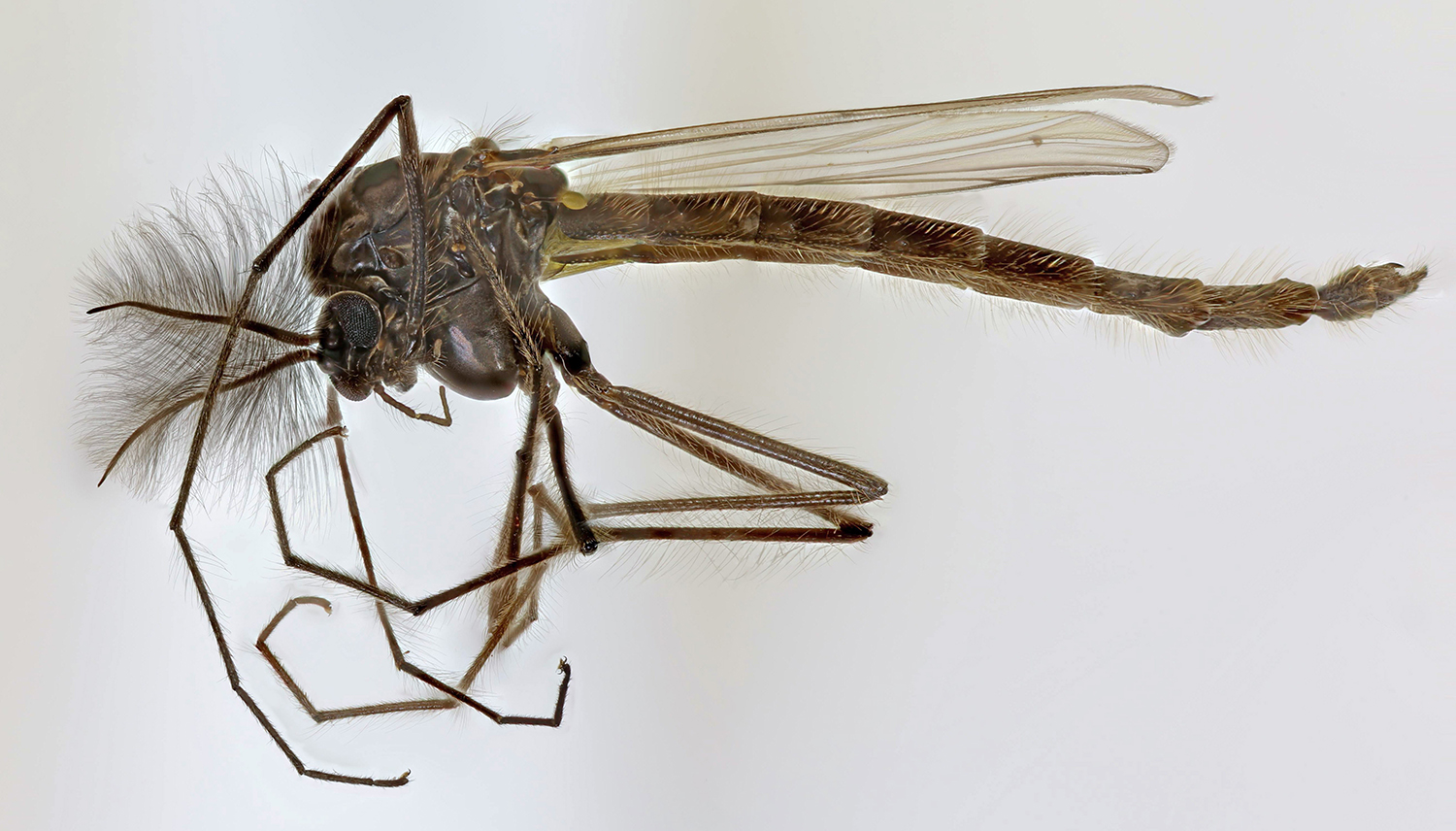
The related species Chironomus antrhacinus

The first documented accounts of the Chironomidae family were in the late 19th or early 20th century in England. Entomologists at first had trouble differentiating the difference between subfamilies and genera of the Chironomidae, but had a breakthrough regarding the recognition of difference in their pupal stage. The genus name Chironomus was decided, which was derived from the Ancient Greek word cheironomos, meaning to gesture with your hand. This followed the spirit of the family name Chironomidae, which in Ancient Greek means a pantomimist or one who entertains or dances with exaggerated hand movements. These meanings of names most likely alluded to the swarming behavior and movement of the midges belonging to the Chironomidae family. Lastly, the species name, annularius, is derived from the Latin language, with the meaning 1 year old or annual. This naming is contradictory to the life span of the adult non-biting midges (3 days to a few weeks) but may be related to the seasonable noticeability of the C. annularius, particularly in spring and fall.

Due to the broad distribution of the Chironomus genus across the world, it has been given a plethora of nicknames. In North America, they are called chizzywinks or blind mosquitos near Florida, and in the Great Lakes region, they are referred to as bay flies or lake flies. Further north in Canada, the Chironomus are called muckle heads or muffle heads. Across the Atlantic in England, the Chironomus are referred to as non-biting midges or common midges. The diversity of name for such a genus of insects suggest that it exists almost worldwide.

== Life cycle ==
=== Egg ===
The first stage of development is egg stage. Adult lay eggs directly into the fresh water. This egg will free float or sink to the bottom and hatch in a few days or at most a week. The most defining feature for the fly during this stage is not the egg itself, but rather the gelatinous matrix that accompanies the egg. This matrix expands in the water as it exits the womb and provides a protective layer for the eggs. The eggs are laid out in a helical arrangement in the matrix. The eggs themselves are 1–3 mm in diameter and an oval shape. They are produced in numbers averaging around 3,000.

=== Larval ===
The second stage is the larval instar stage. There are four instar stages, ending with a preparatory pupal phase. During the instar phases, there are a series of great morphological changes or additions with each molting. By the fourth instar stage, the following physical features have developed. The head capsule is a fully sclerotized cranium with very few internal structures excluding a few internal ridges. The mandibles are fully developed on an oblique plane, with a dominant apical tooth, a dorsal tooth, and an additional number of inner teeth. There are a set of eyes or areas of pigment that lie beneath the cuticle and lastly two antennae protruding from the dorsal cranium. The body is segmented into three thoracic sections and nine abdominal sections. Protruding from the thoracic sections are parapods, fleshy false legs that have claws at the end. Less noticeably, there is a set of procerci with a small set of apical hairs. At the end of the fourth instar stage, the fourth instar encases itself in a protective matrix for its pupal phase.

=== Pupal ===
The third stage is the pupal stage. This is considered the transitional phase between the fourth instar stage and the adult imago C. annularius. This phase typically lasts between a few days and a week. The first notable development is the exuviae, a protective pupal skin. This can be segmented into the cephalothorax (head and thorax) and the abdomen. The cephalothorax has a thoracic horn, the main respiratory organ, and the leg sheath that cover the legs and fold back beneath the wings. The abdomen contains a distribution of spines, spinules, and tubercles. These have been described as having a Tergal pattern or as an armament of some sort. At the end of the pupal stage, the pupae leave its protective shell and swim upwards to the surface. Upon reaching the top of the water it molts one final time into the adult stage.

=== Adult ===
The adult stage is the shortest-lived and lasts only for a week. The Annularius are fully developed and have several distinct features. Their bodies are a dark brown or black color and the wing length ranges from 4 to 6 mm. The mandibles are still oblique but have grown to a much larger size and have a dark black hue. The spinules and spines protrude the most out of the back.

== Social behavior ==
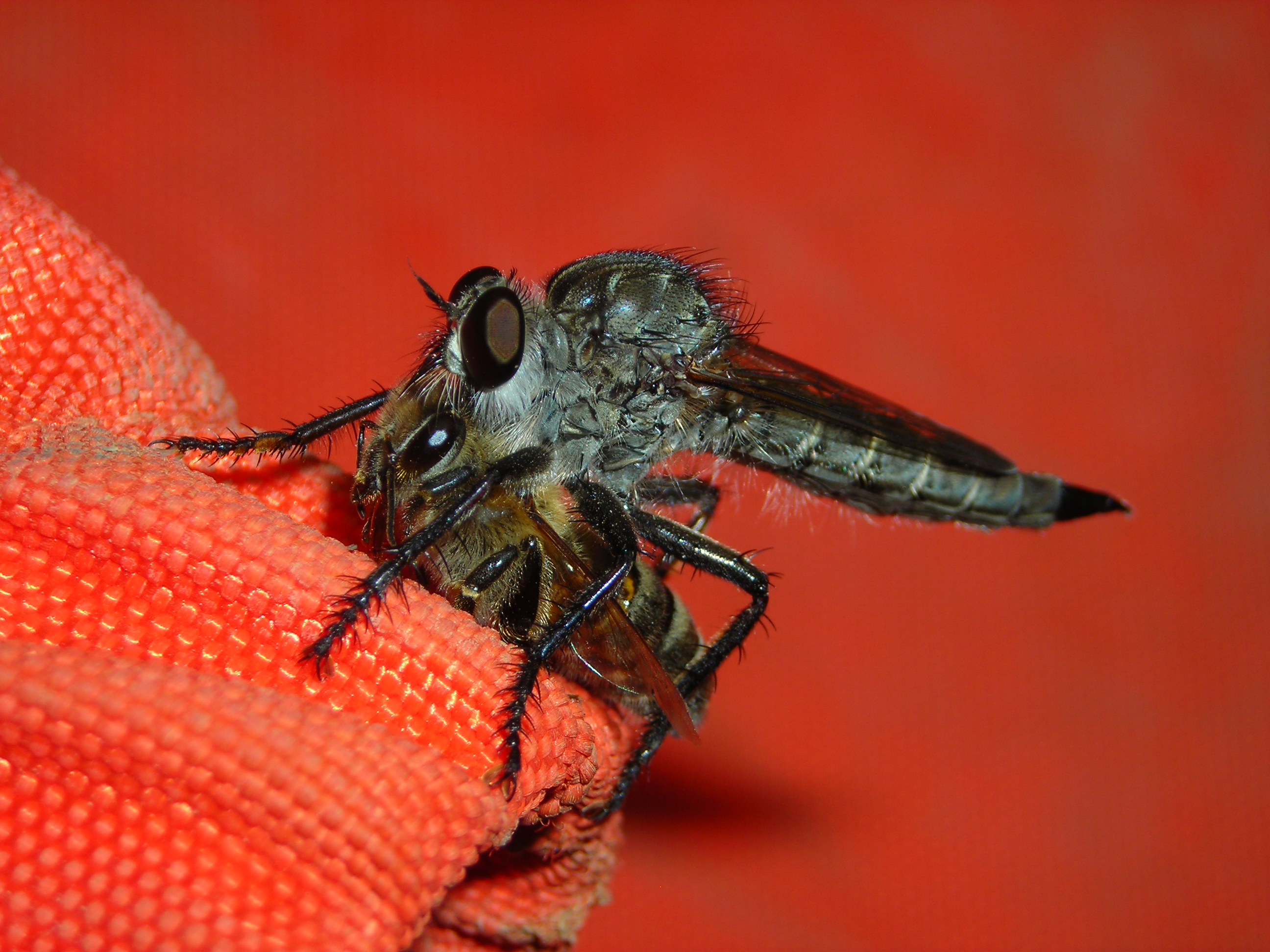
Examples of Insect Predation (Not C. Annularius)

Swarming behavior or "aerial aggregations" is a common social behavior for the fly species. There are costs and benefits to grouping with other members of your species. Individuals experience decreased rates of predation. This is due to an overall decline by predators on a swarm as well as the dilution of predator attacks per individual. Feeding has also been proven to be more efficient in larger populations. This may be due to group communication and direction to food and resources. Lastly, swarming of males increases the attraction of females, because the sound of the flight tone is amplified when they band together. This may not necessarily increase reproductive success of all individuals, but rather individuals that are able to detect and mate with females first experience the benefit of increased reproductive fitness.

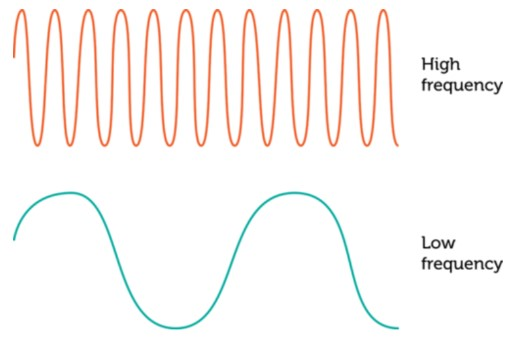
Frequency (High vs. Low)

The C. annularius species has specific flight tone frequencies. Males have an average frequency of 434 Hz and females have an average frequency of 240 Hz. Different genera of the Chironomus have different frequencies, thus the discernment of tonal frequencies is particularly important in swarming and for mating.

== Food resources ==
C. annularius, like most Diptera insects, differ in their diet through their life cycle. Larvae have mandibles and varying internal teeth. These larvae feed on fine particulate organic material floating at the bottom of the body of water they were born in. This diet of decaying material continues with a brief intermission during the pupal phase, until adulthood. Once the species emerge from their cocoons and out of the water, their diets change dramatically. The most noticeable change is that the individuals no longer feed on submerged organic particles. They transition to feeding on surface algae, secretions of aphids, and other plant material. Although the species resembles its close relative the mosquito, it is a non-biting midge and does not consume blood.

== Human interaction ==
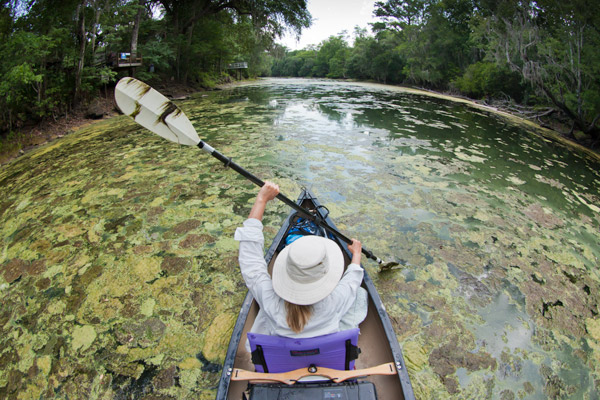
Algae Bloom

The indirect effects of C. annularius are still under research. However, its diet has been recognized as particularly influential. The larvae of the flies eat algae and macrophytes in fresh bodies of water, behavior which can be beneficial when algae blooms or overcrowding of macrophyte beds occur. However, the opposite can be said when they pose a negative impact by clearing all healthy algae from ponds or affecting the health of macrophytes. Most interactions, though, of their observed diet have leaned more towards the former.
