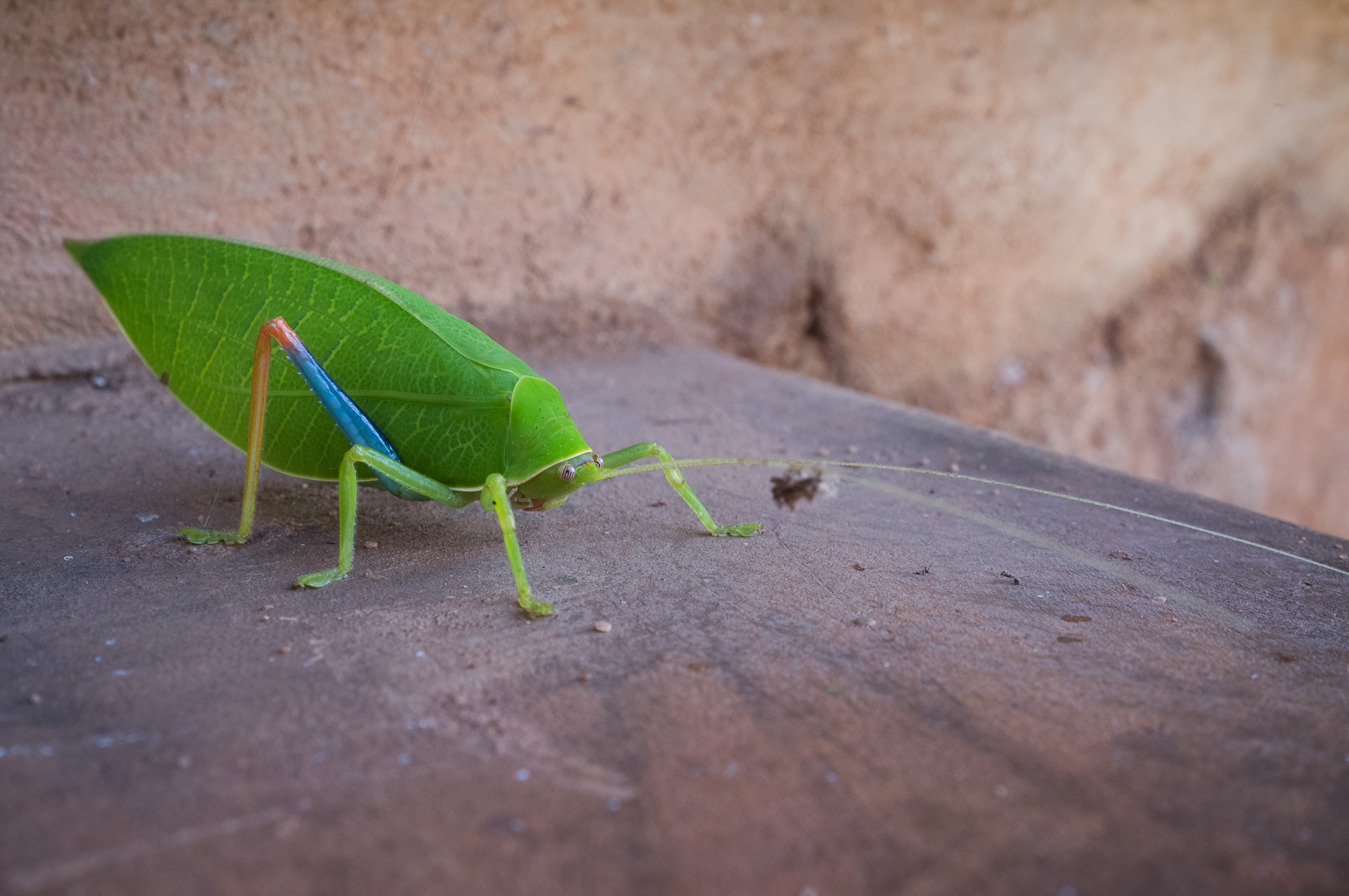

Conservation status
- Least Concern (IUCN 3.1)

Scientific classification
- Kingdom: Animalia
- Phylum: Arthropoda
- Class: Insecta
- Order: Orthoptera
- Suborder: Ensifera
- Family: Tettigoniidae
- Subfamily: Pseudophyllinae
- Genus: Zabalius
- Species: Z. ophthalmicus

Binomial name
- Zabalius ophthalmicus (Walker, 1869)

= Zabalius ophthalmicus =

Species of cricket-like insect

Zabalius ophthalmicus, the blue-legged sylvan katydid, is a species of katydid found in southern, eastern and central Africa. It is common and widespread, leading the IUCN to classify it as least concern.
