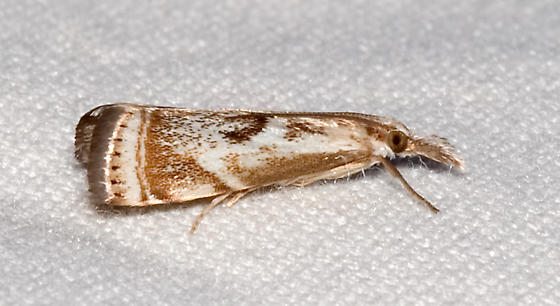
- Microcrambus elegans

Scientific classification
- Domain: Eukaryota
- Kingdom: Animalia
- Phylum: Arthropoda
- Class: Insecta
- Order: Lepidoptera
- Family: Crambidae
- Tribe: Crambini
- Genus: Microcrambus; Błeszyński, 1963

= Microcrambus =

Genus of moths

Microcrambus is a genus of moths of the family Crambidae. The genus was described by Stanisław Błeszyński in 1963.

== Species ==
- Microcrambus agnesiella (Dyar, 1914)
- Microcrambus arcas Błeszyński, 1967
- Microcrambus asymmetricus Błeszyński, 1967
- Microcrambus atristrigellus (Hampson, 1919)
- Microcrambus bellargus Błeszyński, 1967
- Microcrambus bifurcatus Błeszyński, 1967
- Microcrambus biguttellus (Forbes, 1920)
- Microcrambus caracasellus Błeszyński, 1967
- Microcrambus castrella (Schaus, 1922)
- Microcrambus chrysoporellus (Hampson, 1895)
- Microcrambus copelandi Klots, 1968
- Microcrambus croesus Błeszyński, 1967
- Microcrambus cyllarus Błeszyński, 1963
- Microcrambus discludellus (Möschler, 1890)
- Microcrambus elegans (Clemens, 1860)
- Microcrambus elpenor Błeszyński, 1967
- Microcrambus expansellus (Zeller, 1877)
- Microcrambus flemingi Błeszyński, 1967
- Microcrambus francescella (Schaus, 1922)
- Microcrambus grisetinctellus (Hampson, 1896)
- Microcrambus hector Błeszyński, 1963
- Microcrambus hippuris Błeszyński, 1967
- Microcrambus holothurion Błeszyński, 1967
- Microcrambus immunellus (Zeller, 1872)
- Microcrambus intangens (Dyar, 1914)
- Microcrambus jolas Błeszyński, 1967
- Microcrambus kimballi Klots, 1968
- Microcrambus laurellus Błeszyński, 1967
- Microcrambus matheri Klots, 1968
- Microcrambus mercury Błeszyński, 1963
- Microcrambus minor (Forbes, 1920)
- Microcrambus niphosella (Hampson, 1908)
- Microcrambus paucipunctellus (Schaus, 1922)
- Microcrambus podalirius Błeszyński, 1967
- Microcrambus polingi (Kearfott, 1908)
- Microcrambus priamus Błeszyński, 1967
- Microcrambus prolixus Błeszyński, 1967
- Microcrambus psythiella (Schaus, 1913)
- Microcrambus pusionellus (Zeller, 1863)
- Microcrambus retuselloides Błeszyński, 1967
- Microcrambus retusellus (Schaus, 1913)
- Microcrambus rotarellus (Dyar, 1927)
- Microcrambus strabelos Błeszyński, 1967
- Microcrambus subretusellus Błeszyński, 1967
- Microcrambus tactellus (Dyar, 1914)
