= Microcrambus copelandi =

Scientific classification
- Kingdom: Animalia
- Phylum: Arthropoda
- Clade: Pancrustacea
- Class: Insecta
- Order: Lepidoptera
- Family: Crambidae
- Genus: Microcrambus
- Species: M. copelandi

Binomial name
- Microcrambus copelandi Klots, 1968

Species of moth

Microcrambus copelandi is a moth in the family Crambidae. It was described by Alexander Barrett Klots in 1968. It has been recorded from the US states of Arizona, California, Florida, Ohio, South Carolina and Texas. It is also present in Mexico.

The length of the forewings is 6-8.5 mm. Adults have been recorded on wing from April to September and in November.

The larvae feed on Gramineae species.
