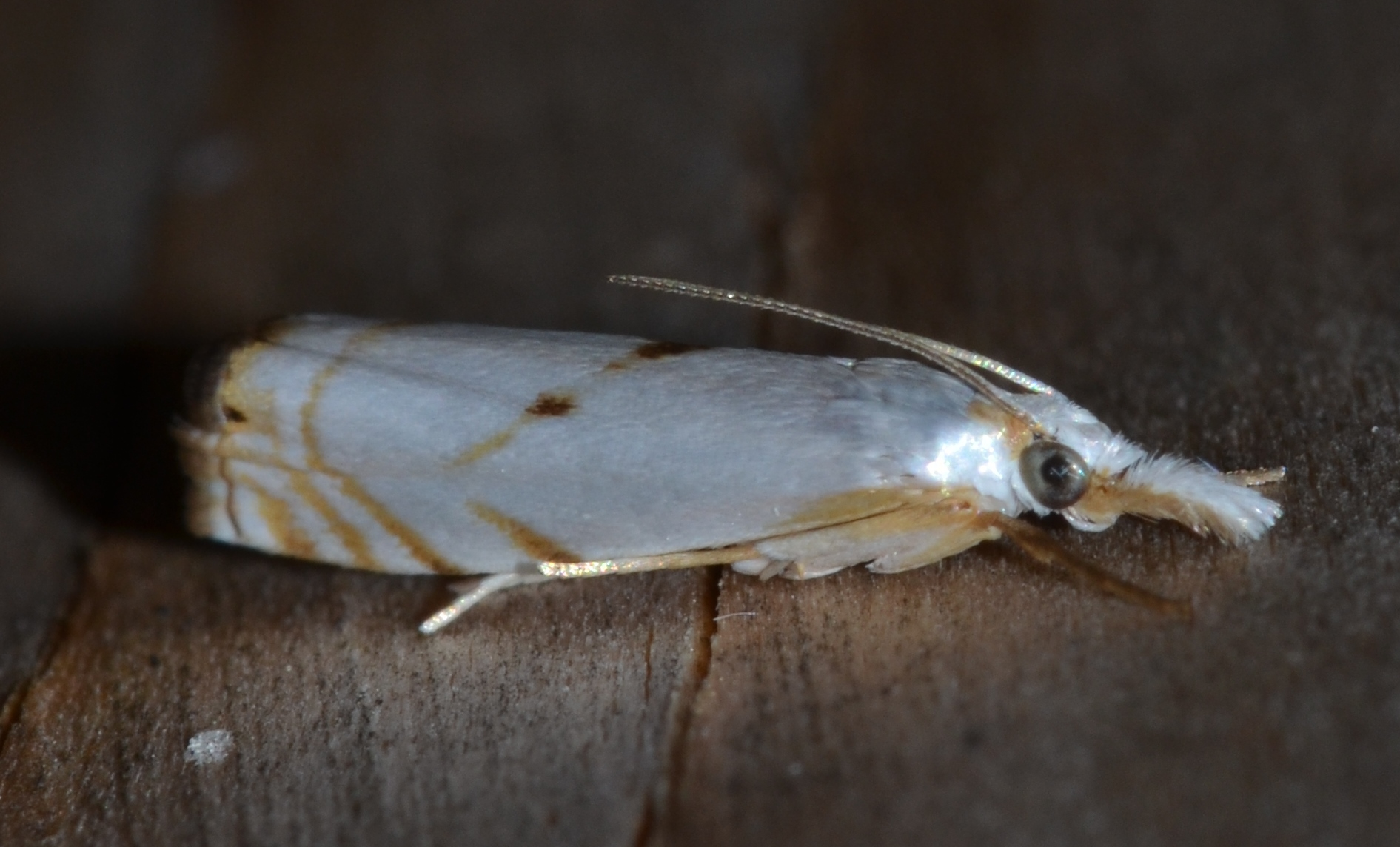

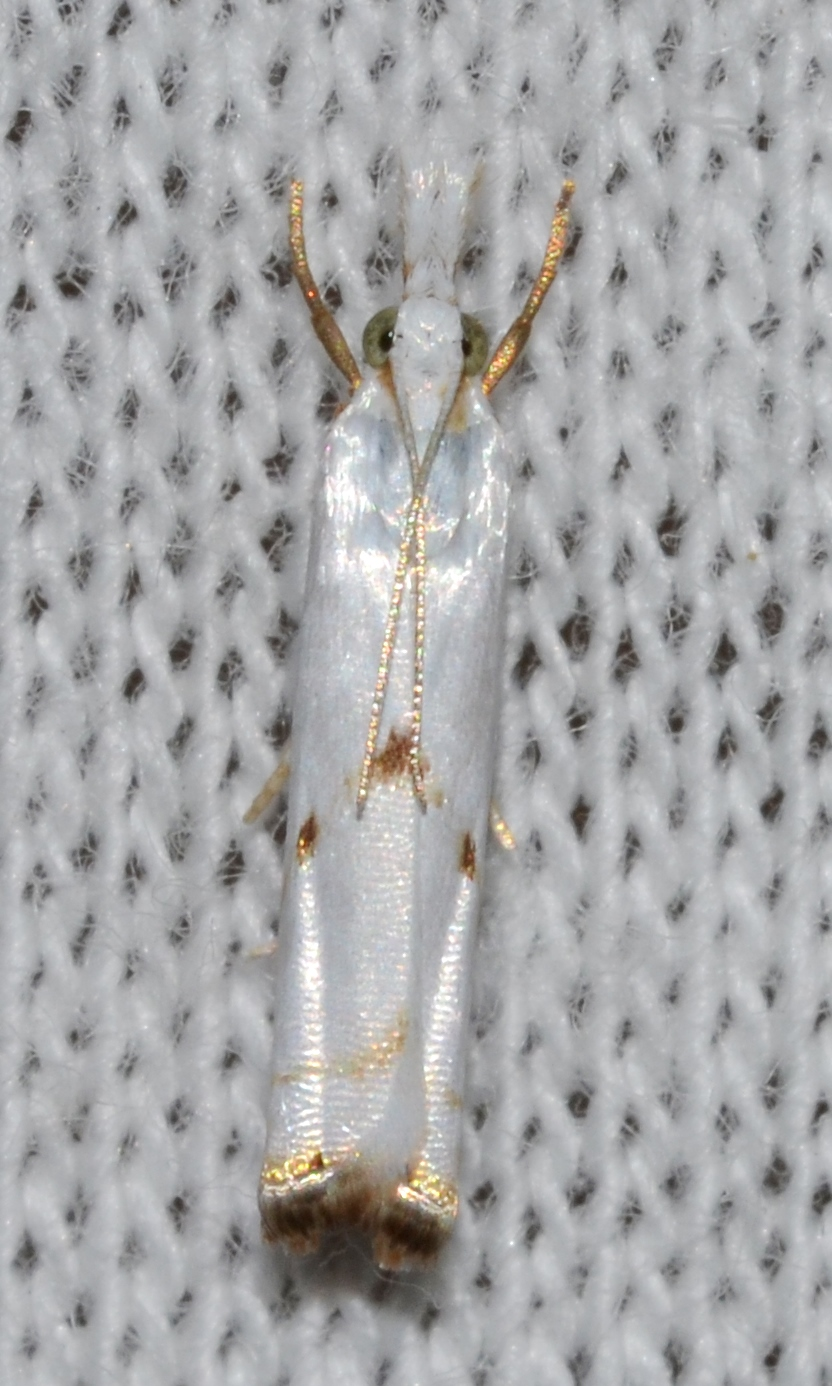

Scientific classification
- Kingdom: Animalia
- Phylum: Arthropoda
- Clade: Pancrustacea
- Class: Insecta
- Order: Lepidoptera
- Family: Crambidae
- Genus: Microcrambus
- Species: M. biguttellus

Binomial name
- Microcrambus biguttellus Forbes, 1920

Synonyms
- Crambus biguttellus Forbes, 1920; Crambus biguttelus Schaus, 1940

= Microcrambus biguttellus =

Species of moth

Microcrambus biguttellus, the gold-stripe grass-veneer, is a moth in the family Crambidae. It was described by William Trowbridge Merrifield Forbes in 1920. It is found in North America, where it has been recorded from Alabama, Florida, Georgia, Illinois, Indiana, Kentucky, Maine, Manitoba, Maryland, Massachusetts, Michigan, Minnesota, Mississippi, New Brunswick, New Jersey, New York, North Carolina, Nova Scotia, Ohio, Oklahoma, Ontario, Quebec, South Carolina, Tennessee, Texas, West Virginia and Wisconsin. It has also been recorded from Cuba and Puerto Rico.

The length of the forewings is about 8 mm. Adults are on wing between May and September in most of the range, but year round in Florida.

The larvae feed on grasses.
