= Microcrambus rotarellus =

Scientific classification
- Kingdom: Animalia
- Phylum: Arthropoda
- Clade: Pancrustacea
- Class: Insecta
- Order: Lepidoptera
- Family: Crambidae
- Genus: Microcrambus
- Species: M. rotarellus

Binomial name
- Microcrambus rotarellus (Dyar, 1927)

Synonyms
- Crambus rotarellus Dyar, 1927

Species of moth

Microcrambus rotarellus is a moth in the family Crambidae. It was described by Harrison Gray Dyar Jr. in 1927. It is found in Mexico.
