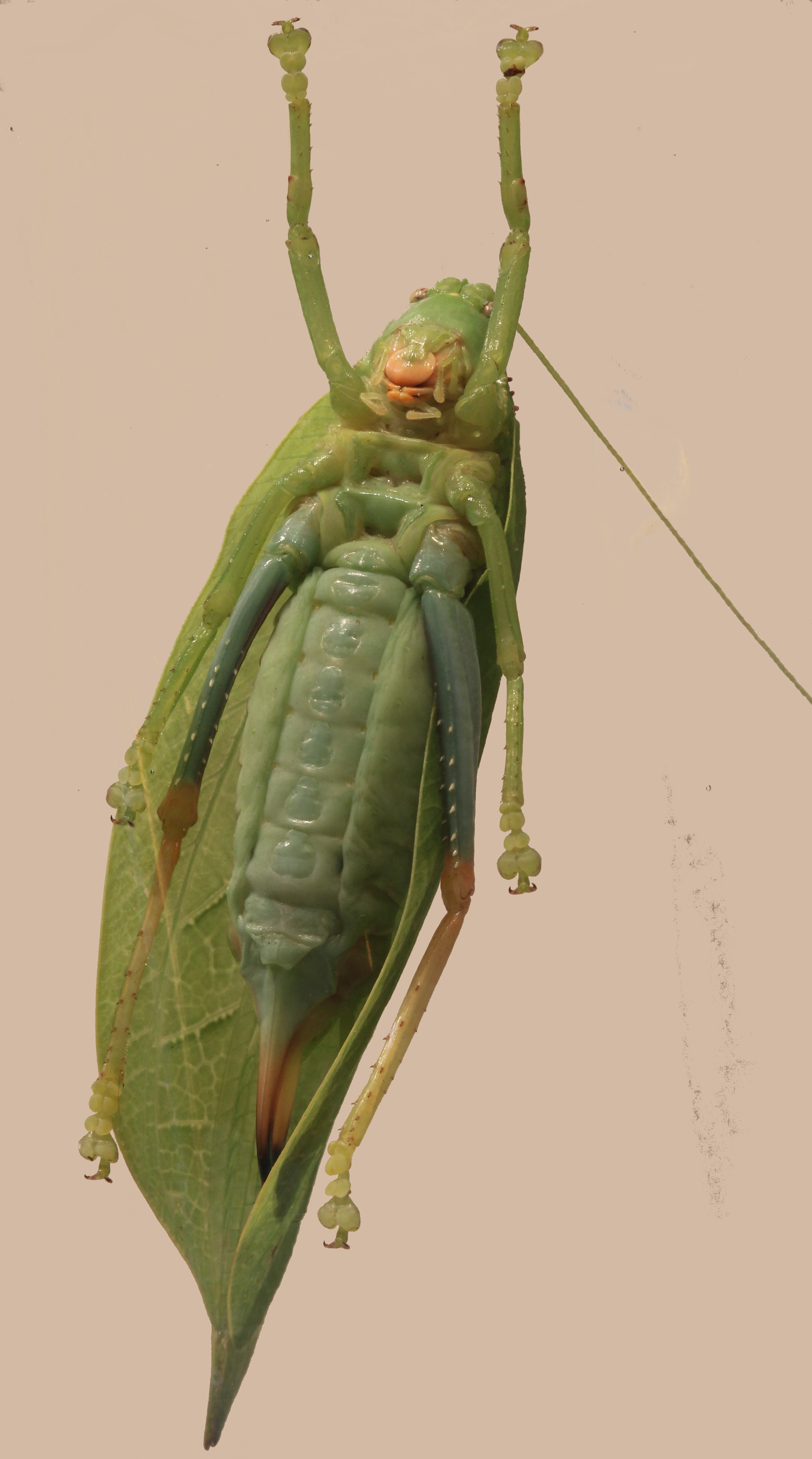
- Zabalius aridus female, ventral aspect

Scientific classification
- Domain: Eukaryota
- Kingdom: Animalia
- Phylum: Arthropoda
- Class: Insecta
- Order: Orthoptera
- Suborder: Ensifera
- Family: Tettigoniidae
- Subfamily: Pseudophyllinae
- Tribe: Pseudophyllini
- Genus: Zabalius (Bolívar, 1886)

Synonyms
- Mataeus Karsch, 1890; Phyllotribonia Pictet & Saussure, 1892

= Zabalius =

Genus of cricket-like animals

Zabalius is a genus of bush crickets or katydids in the subfamily Pseudophyllinae. Its distribution is essentially Afrotropical. They are generally heavily built, tree-dwelling herbivorous katydids, capable of flight.

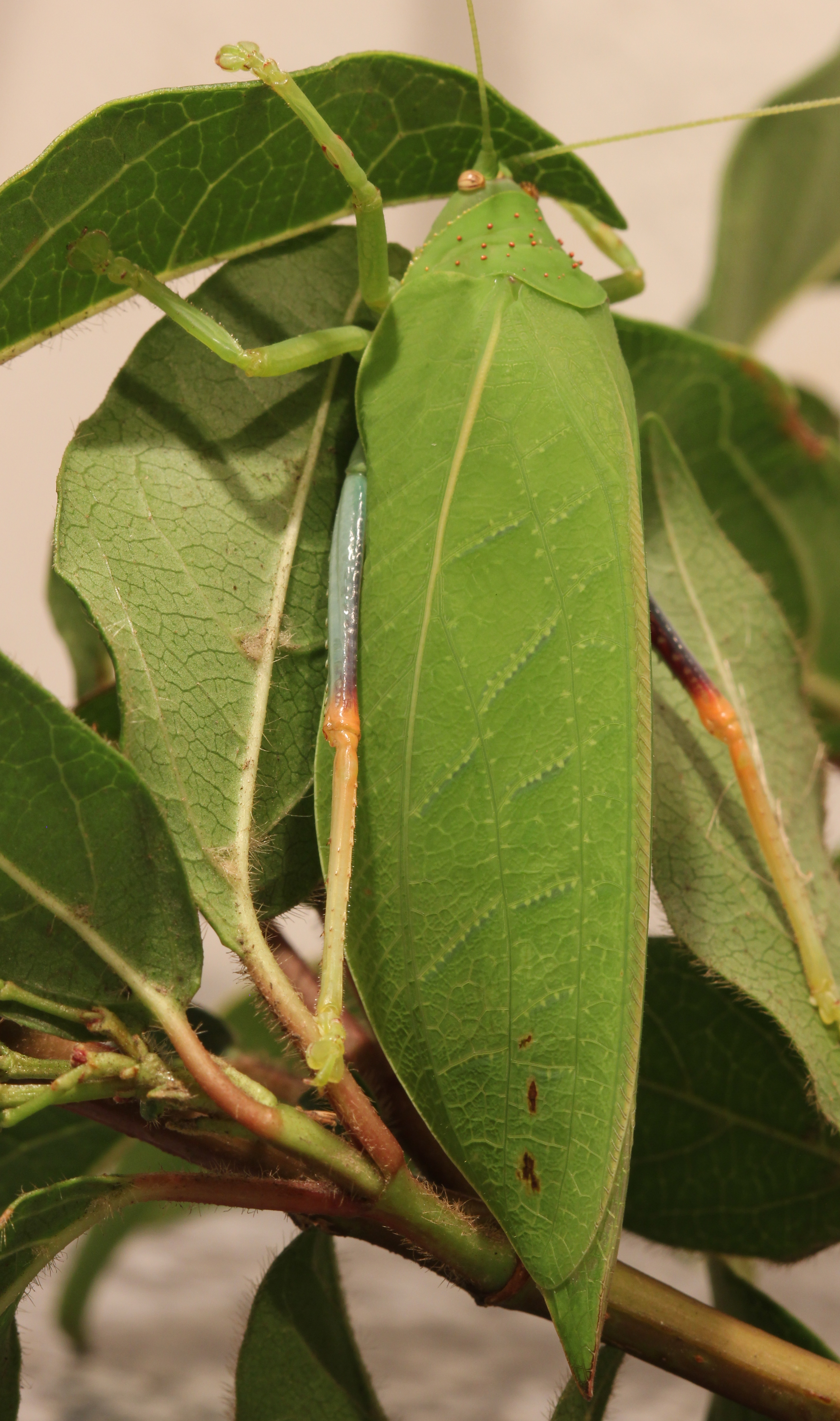
Zabalius aridus. Note external ear slits on anterior tibia

== Species ==
The Orthoptera Species File includes:

- Zabalius albifasciatus (Karsch, 1896)
- Zabalius apicalis (Bolívar, 1886)
- Zabalius aridus (Walker, 1869)
- Zabalius centralis Beier, 1957
- Zabalius congicus Beier, 1954
- Zabalius girardi Beier, 1973
- Zabalius lineolatus (Stål, 1873) - type species (as Mustius guineensis Bolívar)
- Zabalius ophthalmicus (Walker, 1869)
- Zabalius robustus Beier, 1954
- Zabalius verruculosus (Pictet & Saussure, 1892)
