= Tympanal organ =

Hearing organ in insects

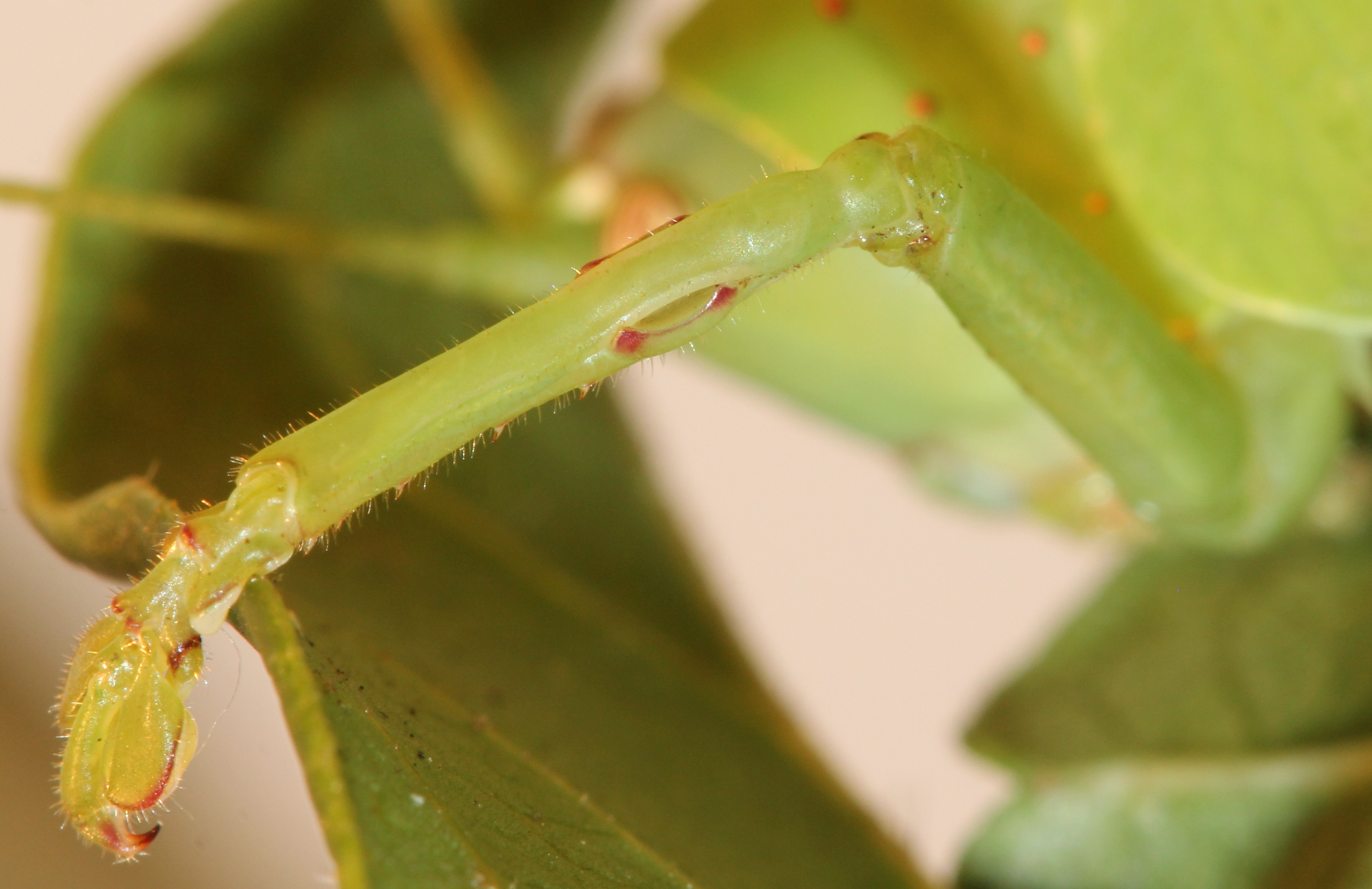
Tympanal organ on the tibia of the katydid Zabalius aridus

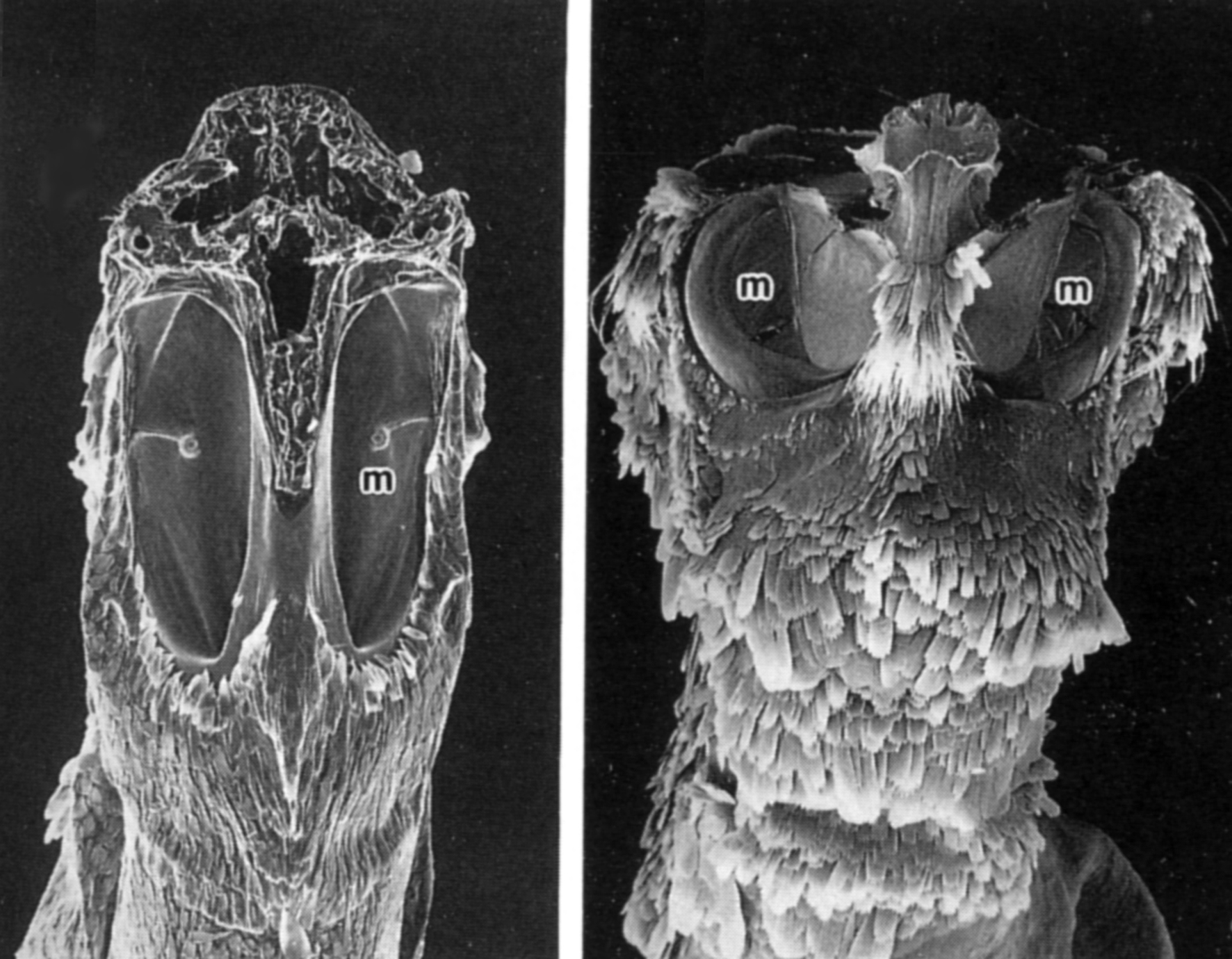
Tympanal organ of two species of moths, ventral view of abdomen (Tineidae and Pyralidae)

A tympanal organ (or tympanic organ) is a hearing organ in insects, consisting of a tympanal membrane (tympanum) stretched across a frame backed by an air sac and associated sensory neurons. Sounds vibrate the membrane, and the vibrations are sensed by a chordotonal organ. Hymenoptera (bees, wasps, ants, etc.) do not have a tympanal organ, but they do have a Johnston's organ.

Tympanal organs have evolved in at least seven different orders of insects. Tympanal organs can occur in just about any part of the insect: the thorax, the base of the wing, the abdomen, the legs, etc., depending on the group of insects. The structures are thought to have evolved independently many times. As a result, their position and structures are often used to help determine the taxonomy of the species. For example, all members of the Geometridae share distinctive paired abdominal tympanal organs that open towards the front side of the first abdominal segment. Within the organ, particular structures vary in shape and are used to indicate shared ancestry of subfamilies. In other families of Lepidoptera having abdominal tympanal organs, the opening may be in a different orientation and the structures differ in shape.

Tympanal organs have evolved in Lepidoptera to allow them to detect the echolocation calls of predatory bats. The range of frequencies that the moth is most sensitive to is usually associated with the frequencies used in echolocation by the sympatric bat community. In the presence of predatory bats, it has been shown that the Lepidoptera species Mythimna unipuncta (true armyworm) stops mating behaviors, such as female calling and male wing flapping. As well, hearing is important for mating behaviors in this species because females increase their flapping frequency around males and males produce a trembling noise in response.

== Anatomic terminology ==
Maes (1985) has provided an extensive overview of tympanal organs in the moth family Pyralidae which also introduces some nomenclature:

- tympanal membrane (tympanum): very thin membrane, transparent when dry, of the auditory organ
- conjunctivum: membrane immediately connected with the tympanum
- praecinctorium: median expansion of the intersegmental thoraco-abdominal membrane. In the Pyralidae type it is usually very simple. It is more developed in the Crambidae type.
- intersegmental thoraco-abdominal membrane : intersegmental membrane between the metathorax and the first abdominal sclerites

== See also ==
- Tympanum (anatomy)
