= Subgenual organ =

Insect sensory organ

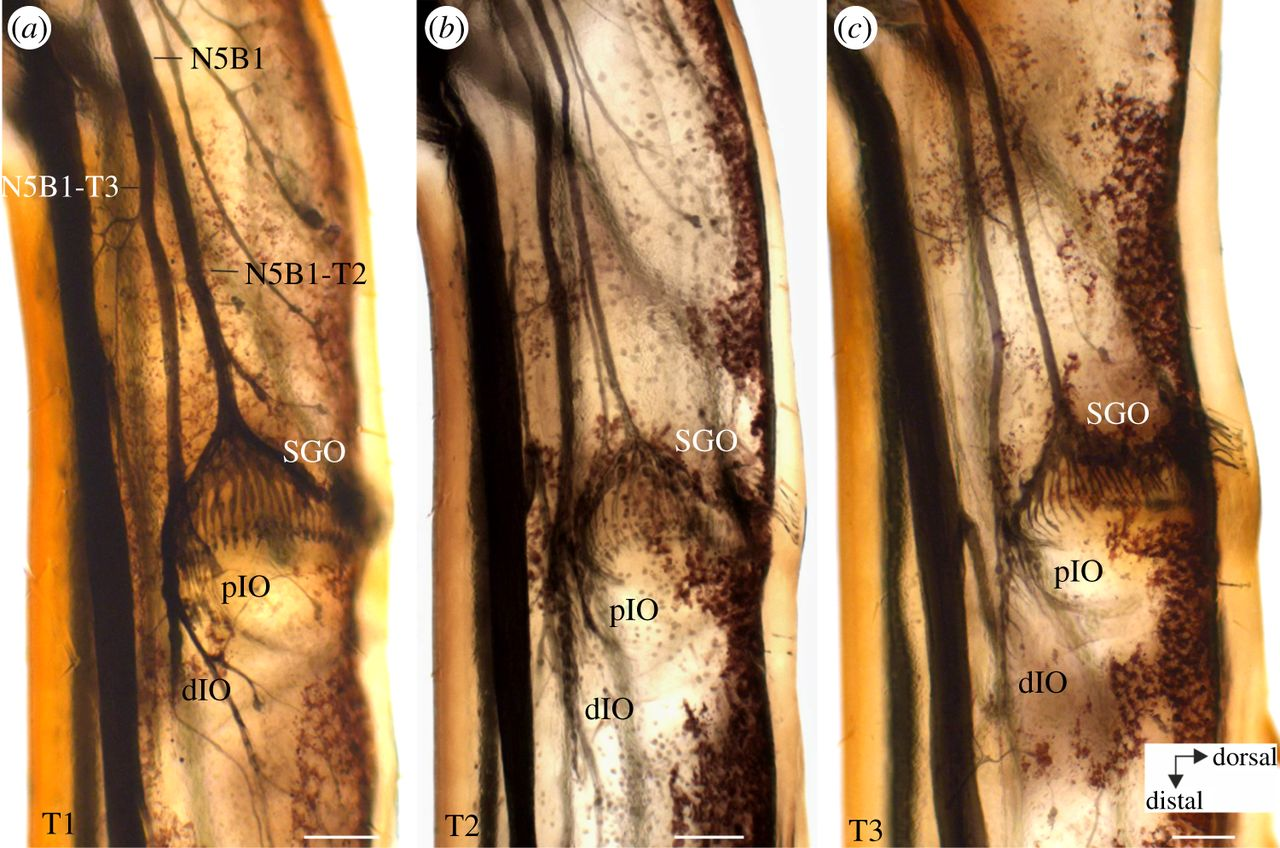
Neuroanatomy of the subgenual organ, a sensory organ in Troglophilus neglectus. SGO is the Subgenual organ, pIO is the proximal intermediary organ and dIO is the distal intermediary organ

The subgenual organ is an organ in insects that is involved in the perception of sound. The name (Latin sub: "below" and genus: "knee") refers to the location of the organ just below the knee in the tibia of all legs in most insects.

The function of the organ is performed by aggregations of scolopidia, the unit mechanoreceptor in invertebrates. The organ is thought to be an evolutionary artifact of ancestral insects who used their legs to detect vibrations in the underlying substrate.

The anatomy and innervation of the organ is highly variable between species. However, the organ may be sensitive enough to detect less than 1 nm of displacement in the ground, and sometimes airborne sound waves. The sensitivity of the organ varies from species to species; in Orthoptera, Hymenoptera and Lepidoptera, sensitivity is on the order of one (or greater) kilohertz, while in Hemiptera sensitivity reaches only a few hundred hertz.

== Characteristics within orders ==
- Lepidoptera and Hymenoptera: possess less well-developed subgenual organs; in the former, they are suspended on the subgenual nerve, in the latter, cone-shaped
  - The subgenual organ is particularly important in parasitoid wasps, where it is a major way of finding suitable target animals in substrates.
- Orthoptera: possess particularly well-developed subgenual organs associated with a tympanal organ on the tibia that likely serves a separate function; subgenual organ often lies in the neighborhood of other organs containing scolopidia
- Blattodea: subgenual organ is often located near other sensory organs containing scolopidia, within the subgenual organ complex (SGO).
  - In Periplaneta cockroaches, a sensitivity down to 2 nm of displacement has been determined.
- Diptera and Coleoptera: lack such an organ completely
- Mecoptera: Panorpa has only one sensory neuron, while some parasitoid wasps have as much as 400 scolopidia in their organs

== Development ==
=== Teleogryllus commodus ===
Each larval stage forms one scolopidium that contributes to the organogenesis. All scolopidia are formed by the third larval stage and the organ has already its final shape by the time of egg hatching. A bilobar structure in the locust embry forms the precursor of the subgenual organ. Axon growth from the subgenual organ in grasshoppers is contingent on semaphorin I.

=== Ephippiger ephippiger ===
In the bushcricket, all scolopidia (22-24 in total) are already present in the first larval stage. In the latter, the organ increases in size proportionally to the growth of the limb containing it and has the shape of a fan.

== Anatomy in specific species ==
=== Honeybees ===
In the honeybee Apis mellifera, the sensing by the subgenual organ is directed by the inertia of the haemolymph; it causes a differential movement of the organ swimming in the haemolymph with respect to the rest of the limb. More than 39 scolopidia, sensory cells, are involved in sensing the movement of the haemolymph between the cuticle and two tracheae. The functionality is similar to the vestibular system of vertebrates. The bee organ is cone shaped branching out from its nerve and almost obstructs haemolymph flow through the limb.

=== Carpenter ants ===
In the carpenter ant Camponotus ligniperda, the subgenual organ has the form of a deformed sphere. On one end attachment cells connect it to the cuticle; on the other it is innervated by the tibial nerve. The organ has the shape of a cavity surrounded with a monocellular membrane that is heavily folded on the inside. Sensilla extend into the cavity, each containing one neuron with associated dendrites, cilia and glial cells within a lymphatic cavity that is connected to the cavity of the subgenual organ.

=== Termites ===
In the termite Zootermopsis angusticollis and the cockroach Periplaneta americana, the vibration is perceived after about 10-20 milliseconds and stops being perceived after one or two seconds. There are two types of cells with different spatial orientation in the organ; possibly, oscillation causes the cells to shift with respect to each other and generate a signal. Some early research claimed that the sensitivity of the Periplaneta subgenual organ might be far higher than the threshold of about one atom diameter determined for cochlear cells; newer investigation indicated that such a sensitivity may have been the result of artifacts, with the actual sensitivity being comparable to the cochlea.

=== Cockroaches ===
In cockroaches Blaberus discoidalis and Blattella germanica, the organ has the shape of a fan that is placed across the limb. Much of its volume is filled with discoidal cells that serve accessory purposes; they are placed between an epidermal cell layer attached to the cuticle and connective tissue. Sensory structures called chordotonal sensilla are involved in the perception of movement proper and contain a neuron per sensillum, about 40–50 in total. This neuron has a single dendrite and several cilia extend from it.

=== Green lacewing ===
In Chrysoperla carnea, the green lacewing, the organ is involved in sexual behaviour and interindividual or even interspecies communication. A velum spans the interior of each leg and is formed by cap cells. Three scolopidia stretch from the velum to the leg wall, each containing one sensory neuron with a dendrite and attached cilia. The dendrite is accompaigned by a so-called scolopale cell which generates an electron-rich intracellular structure surrounding the dendrite.

=== Crickets ===
In the cave cricket Troglophilus neglectus the subgenual organ is fairly simple and is associated with an intermediary organ. Both are innervated either by one or two nerves, depending on the individual animal.

In the splay-footed cricket Comicus calcaris, the subgenual organ is associated with a crista acustica homolog and an intermediary organ. This organ system is not suitable for hearing sounds, but it is possible that this organ system formed through reduction of a previously existing hearing organ. All three organs are innervated by the same nerve and the subgenual organ of this genus has the largest number of nerve cells of all Ensifera without tympana.

In the heelwalker Karoophasma biedouwense, the subgenual organ is associated with four additional organs containing scolopidia, a trait shared with Mantophasmatodea. Between 15 and 30 scolopidial cells make up the subgenual organ, more in the hind limbs. They form a fan-like structure branching out from the anterior side of the limb. Campaniform sensilla are also associated with the organ. There are no sex differences in the SG organ. All five organs have less sensitivity for high frequencies and appear to be used for male specimens at identifying female animals.

In the cricket Gryllus assimilis the subgenual organ fills up most of the tibia and has a fan-like shape. It is connected to two different neuronal ganglia, one with three bipolar neurons and the other with tens of neurons that also supplies other insect sensory organs located in the leg. Most of the subgenual organ is innervated by this major ganglion, except for the more proximal part. There is also an intermediary organ and a tympanal organ.

=== Stinkbugs ===
In the stinkbug Nezara viridula the organ contains only two scolopidia. The organ is appended to the forward side of the tibia and hangs into the tibial blood cavity. Two cap cells give it a fan-like shape. Analysis of the neuronal response to vibration indicates that the organ undergoes resonance after stimulation, only slowly dampening. The sensitivity is correlated to the insect's own sounds.

=== Stick insects ===
In the stick insects Carausius morosus and Siyploidea sipylus, a highly developed distal organ is present in addition to the subgenual organ, but it contains less scolopidia than the subgenual organ. The organ itself has a semicircular shape inside the limb and is supplied by three different nerves, one of which also targets the distal organ. In both species, there are more than 40 scolopidia in the subgenual organ.
