= Femoral chordotonal organ =

Sensory organ in insect legs

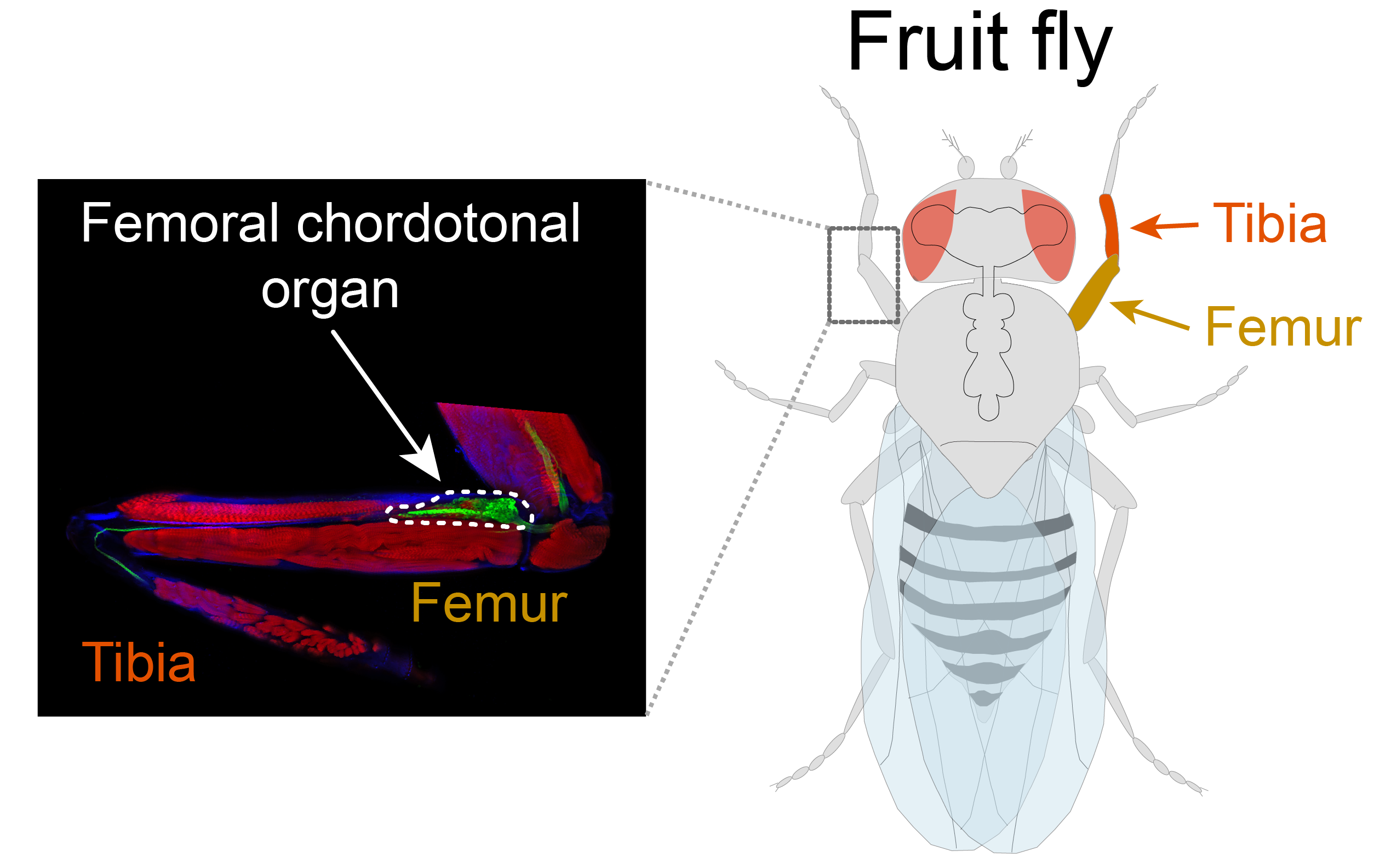
Figure 1. The femoral chordotonal organ in the femur of the fruit fly. Left: A picture of the cells of femoral chordotonal organ (labeled with green fluorescent protein) in the femur of the fruit fly. Right: A drawing of a fruit fly showing the location of the femur and the tibia. The femoral chordotonal organ senses the movements and the position of the femur-tibia joint.

The femoral chordotonal organ is a group of mechanosensory neurons found in an insect leg (Figure 1) that detects the movements and the position of the femur/tibia joint. It is thought to function as a proprioceptor that is critical for precise control of leg position by sending the information regarding the femur/tibia joint to the motor circuits in the ventral nerve cord and the brain

== Structure ==
The cell bodies of the femoral chordotonal neurons are generally located in the proximal femur, and their dendrites are mechanically coupled to the tibia through different types of tendons. In Drosophila, where it is possible to genetically identify different subtypes of femoral chordotonal neurons, the neurons can be divided into three subtypes based on their axonal projection pattern into the ventral nerve cord (Figure 2). The axons of the club neurons project to the center of the ventral nerve cord and form a bundle that is shaped like a club. The axons of the claw neurons split into three branches that are shaped like a claw. The axons of the hook neurons are shaped similar to the peavey hook.

== Sensory coding ==
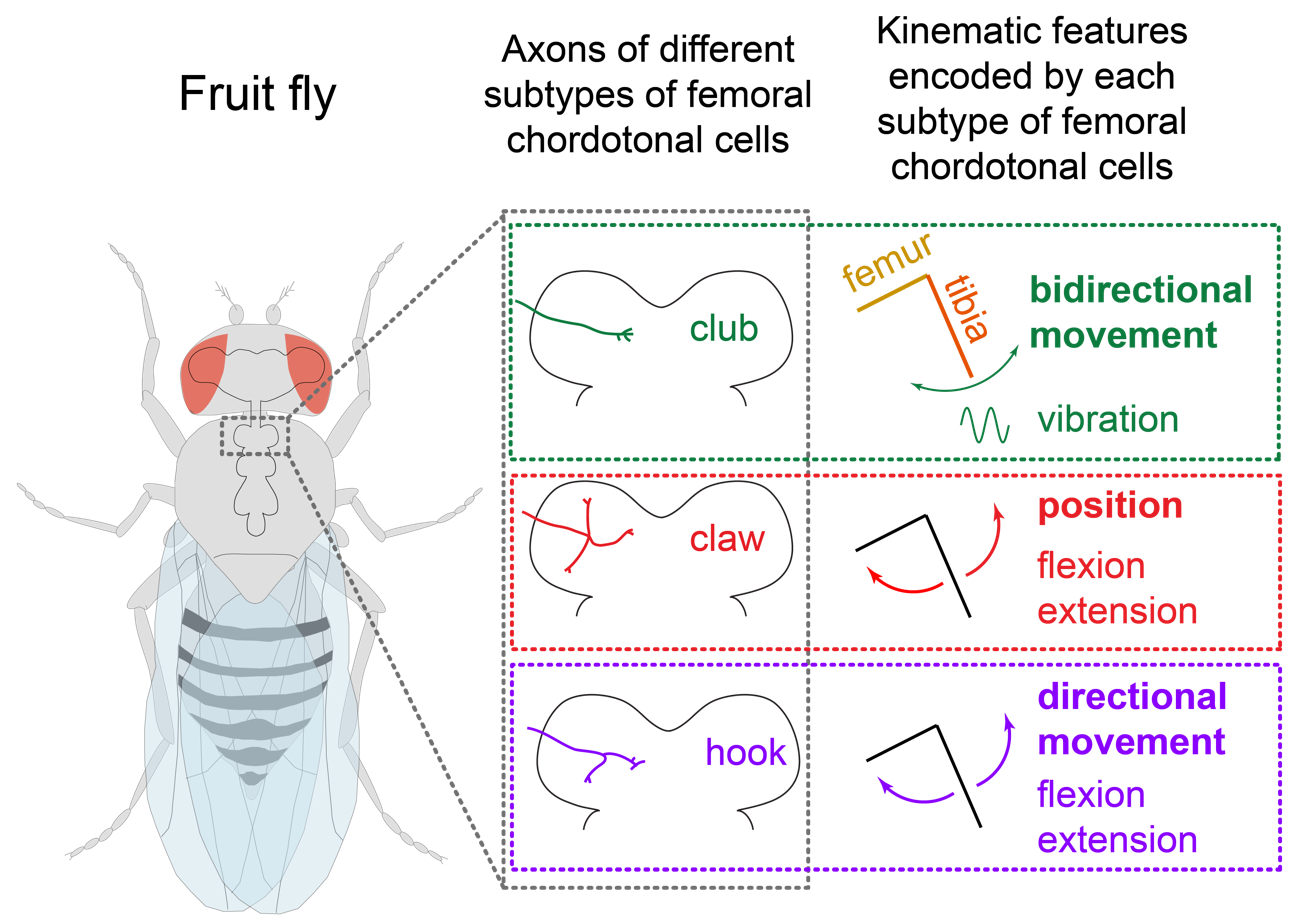
Figure 2. Functional subtypes of femoral chordotonal neurons in the fruit fly. Left: A drawing of a fruit fly showing the location of the ventral nerve cord, where the axons of the femoral chordotonal neurons project to. Center: A drawing of the axon projection pattern of the different subtypes of femoral chordotonal neurons in the fruit fly. Right: Kinematic features of the femur-tibia joint encoded by different subtypes of femoral chordotonal neurons.

The sensory neurons of the femoral chordotonal organ encode various kinematic features of the femur/tibia joint including, position, speed, acceleration, and vibration. In Drosophila, where it is possible to genetically track different subtypes of femoral chordotonal neurons, it is known that these different kinematic features are encoded by anatomically distinct subtypes of neurons mentioned above (Figure 2). The position of the tibia is encoded by the claw neurons, vibrations are encoded by the club neurons, and the direction of the movement is encoded by the hook neurons.

== Function ==
The femoral chordotonal organ is thought to be involved in precise control of leg movements, and the experimental manipulations of the femoral chordotonal organ in stick insects and locusts have shown that they play a critical role during walking and target reaching.

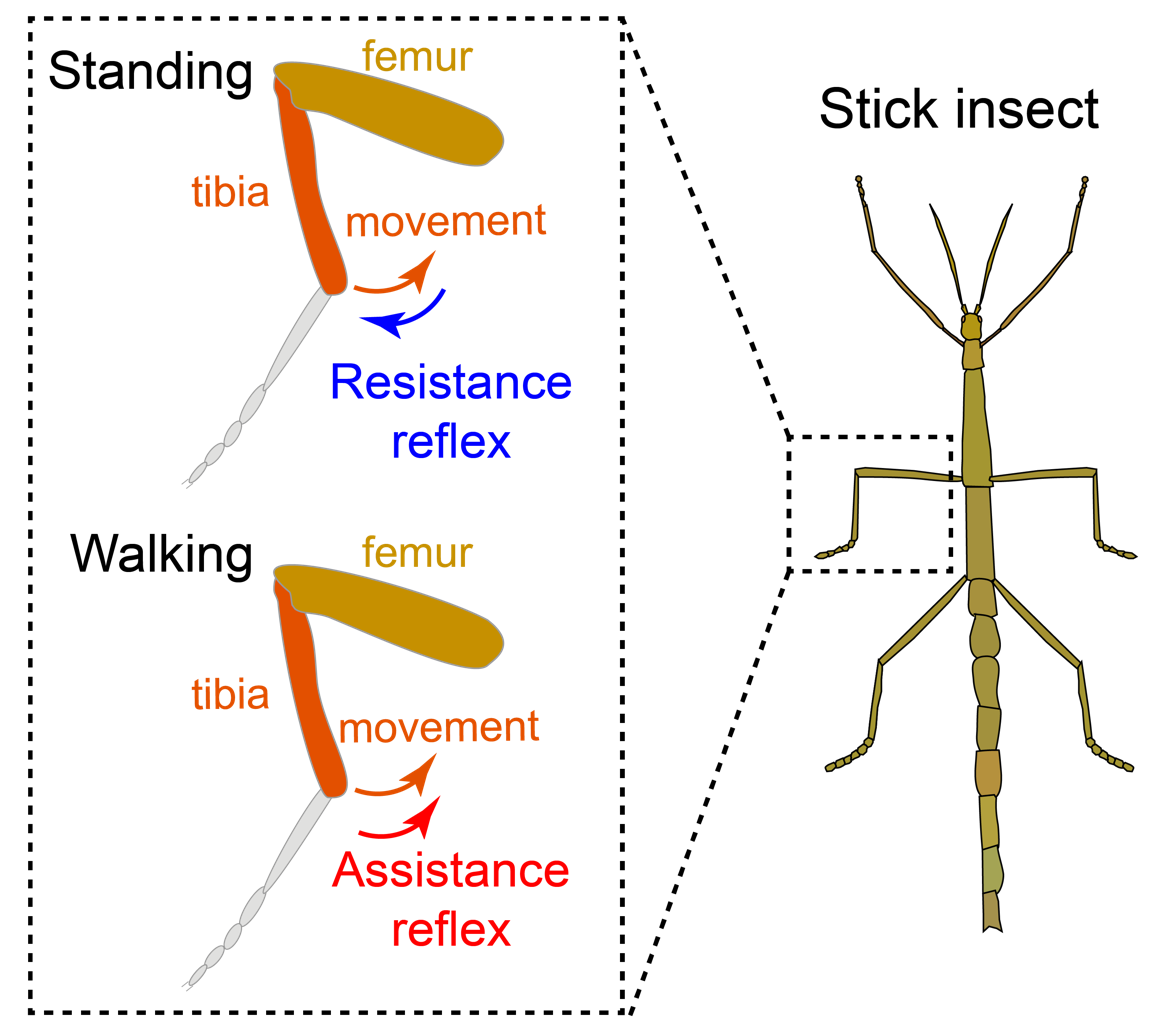
Figure 3. A reflex involving the femoral chordotonal organ changes based on the behavioral state of the animal. Left-Top: During standing, flexion of the tibia detected by the femoral chordotonal organ activates a reflex that resists the movement and stabilize the posture. Left-Bottom: During walking, the same flexion of the tibia leads to an assistive reflex that facilitates the flexion of the joint and enables the animal to walk. Right: A drawing of a stick insect showing the location of the femur and the tibia.

One way in which the femoral chordotonal organ contributes to the control of leg movement is through a resistance reflex, in which a sub-group of femoral chordotonal neurons sense the extension of the tibia and activates the motor neurons that flexes tibia to counteract the movement (Figure 3: Left-Top). During walking, this stabilization reflex is reversed in order to promote the cyclic flexion and extension of the femur-tibia joint necessary for walking (Figure 3: Left-Bottom).

== Biomechanical specialization and feature selectivity ==
One possible mechanism for determining the feature selectivity of femoral chordotonal neurons is biomechanical specialization that transmit distinct forces to each type of proprioceptors, or distribute forces differently to proprioceptors in different locations. For position sensing claw cells of Drosophila, it has been shown that biomechanical properties of the tendon, surrounding tissues, and dendrites lead to different amount of strain generated on the dendrite of a claw cell depending on where the cell is located along the femur. This gradient of strain allows claw cells to respond at different tibia angles and generate a topographic map of joint angles in the femoral chordotonal organ. Biomechanical mechanisms for generating similar gradients of strain in different femoral chordotonal cells have also been reported for locusts and crickets.
