= Charles Frick =

American physician (1823–1860)

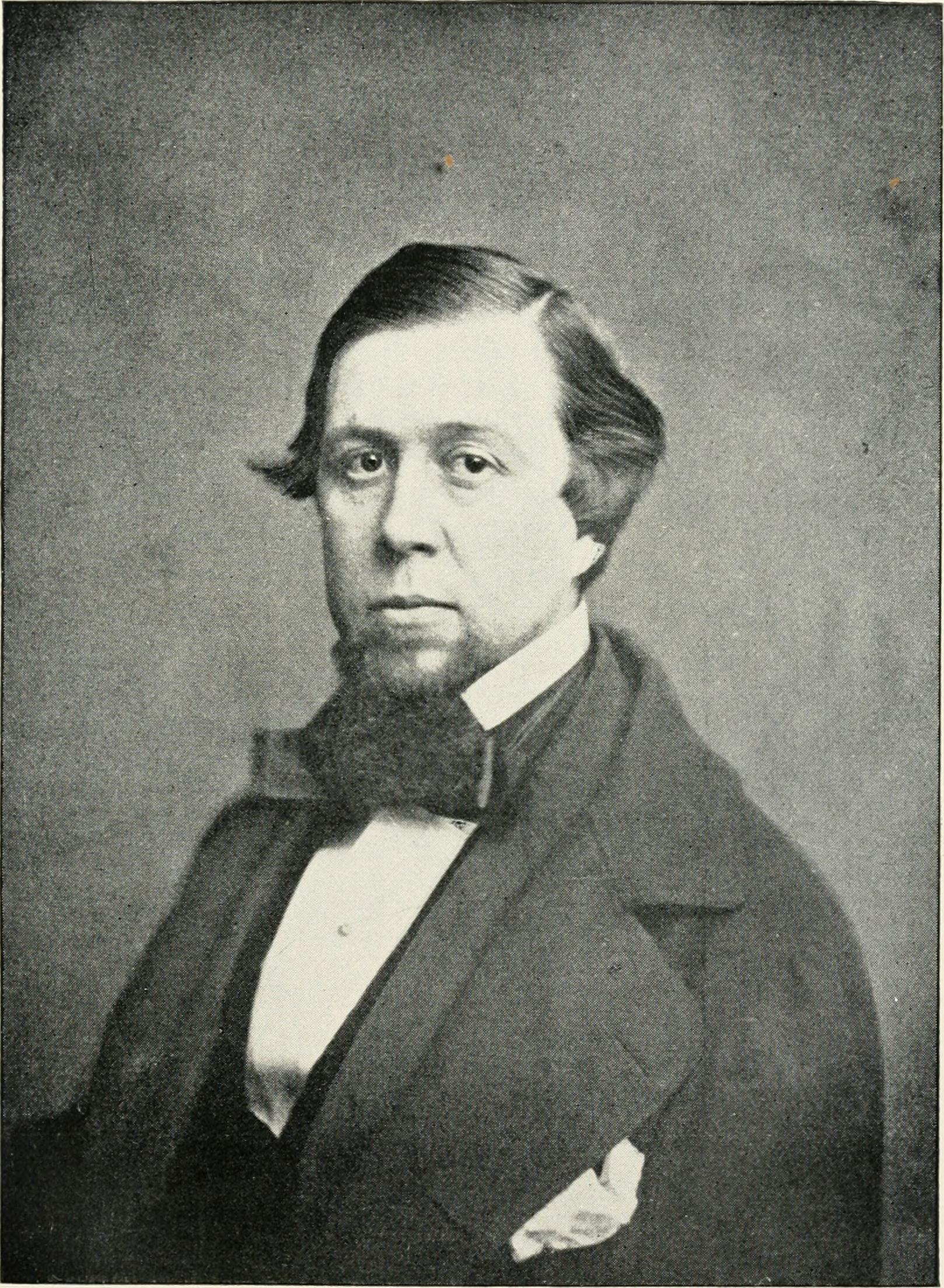

Charles Frick (8 August 1823 in Baltimore, Maryland – 25 March 1860 in Baltimore, Maryland) was a Baltimore medical doctor.

== Biography ==
He studied at Baltimore College, and became a civil engineer. In 1843 he began the study of medicine, and graduated at the University of Maryland School of Medicine in 1845. He early gave his attention to auscultation, which was first introduced into Baltimore by his brother-in-law. In 1847, with three others, he organized the Maryland Medical Institute, a preparatory school of medicine, and took in it the department of practical medicine. From 1849 to 1856, Frick was attending physician to the Maryland Penitentiary. In 1855 and 1856, he took a conspicuous part in the Baltimore Pathological Society. In 1856, he was selected to fill the chair of materia medica in the Maryland College of Pharmacy, which he had aided in organizing. In 1858, after his return from an extended European tour, he accepted the professorship of materia medica and therapeutics in the University of Maryland School of Medicine, and at the same time took charge of the medical department of the Baltimore Infirmary as visiting physician.

== Writings ==
He published Renal Diseases (1850), and contributed papers to the Journal of Medical Science and other scientific periodicals.
