= Johnston's organ =

Anatomic structure in insect antennae

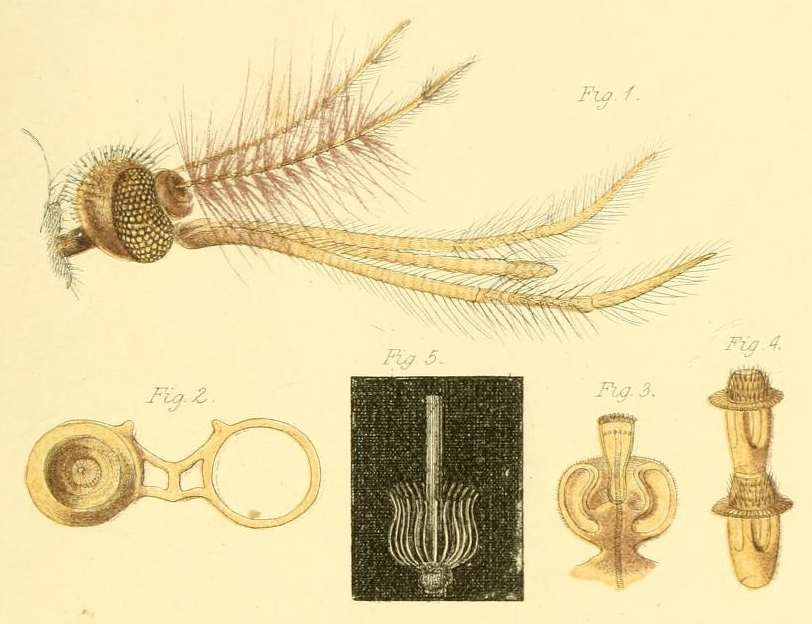
Illustration from the 1855 paper of Christopher Johnston

Johnston's organ is a collection of sensory cells found in the pedicel (the second segment) of the antennae in the class Insecta. Johnston's organ detects motion in the flagellum (third and typically final antennal segment). It consists of scolopidia arrayed in a bowl shape, each of which contains a mechanosensory chordotonal neuron. The number of scolopidia varies between species. In homopterans, the Johnston's organs contain 25–79 scolopidia. The presence of Johnston's organ is a defining characteristic which separates the class Insecta from the other hexapods belonging to the group Entognatha. Johnston's organ was named after the physician Christopher Johnston (1822-1891) father of the physician and Assyriologist Christopher Johnston.

== Function ==
=== In fruit flies, midges and mosquitoes ===
In the fruit fly Drosophila melanogaster and Chironomus annularius, the Johnston's organ contains almost 480 sensory neurons. In the mosquito, the Johnston's organ houses ~15 000 sensory cells in males, comparable to that in the human cochlea, and approximately half as many in females. Distinct populations of neurons are activated differently by deflections of antennae caused by gravity or by vibrations caused by sound or air movement. This differential response allows the fly to distinguish between gravitational, mechanical, and acoustic stimuli.

The Johnston's organ of fruit flies, chironomids or mosquitoes can be used to detect air vibrations caused by the wingbeat frequency or courtship song of a mate. One function of the Johnston's organ is for detecting the wing beat frequency of a mate. Production of sound in air results in two energy components: the pressure component, which is changes in air pressure; and the particle displacement component, which is the back and forth vibration of air particles oscillating in the direction of sound propagation. Particle displacement has greater energy loss than the pressure component when getting further from the sound source, so for quiet sounds such as small flies, it is detectable only within a few wavelengths of the source.

Another function of the Johnston's organ in fruit flies is to detect changes in the wing induced airflow during visually induced turns and control the magnitude of steering responses. During visually induced turns, antenna located opposite to the turn direction gets closer to the wing. This increases the wing induced airflow and increases the activation of the neurons in the Johnston's organ. Increased activation of the Johnston's organ neurons works to reduce the wing stroke amplitude of the contralateral wing, providing a positive feedback loop to enhance the initial stages of the visually induced turns.

Insects, such as fruit flies and bees, detect sounds using loosely attached hairs or antennae which vibrate with air particle movement. (Tympanal organs detect the pressure component of sound.) Near-field sound, because of the rapid dissipation of energy, is suitable only for very close communication. Two examples of near-field sound communication are bee's waggle dance and Drosophila courtship songs. In fruit flies, the arista of the antennae and the third segment act as the sound receiver. Vibrations of the receiver cause rotation of the third segment, which channels sound input to the mechanoreceptors of the Johnston's organ.

=== In hawk moths ===
The Johnston's organ plays a role in the control of flight stability in hawk moths. Kinematic data measured from hovering moths during steady flight indicate that the antennae vibrate with a frequency matching wingbeat (27 Hz). During complex flight, however, angular changes of the flying moth cause Coriolis forces, which are predicted to manifest as a vibration of the antenna of at about twice wingbeat frequency (~60 Hz). When antennae were manipulated to vibrate at a range of frequencies and the resulting signals from the neurons associated with the Johnston's organs were measured, the response of the scolopidia neurons to the frequency was tightly coupled in the range of 50–70 Hz, which is the predicted range of vibrations caused by Coriolis effects. Thus, the Johnston's organ is tuned to detect angular changes during maneuvering in complex flight.

=== In honeybees ===
Dancing honeybees (Apis mellifera) describe the location of nearby food sources by emitted airborne sound signals. These signals consist of rhythmic high-velocity movement of air particles. These near-field sounds are received and interpreted using the Johnston's organ in the pedicel of the antennae. Honeybees also perceive electric field changes via the Johnston's organs in their antennae and possibly other mechanoreceptors. Electric fields generated by movements of the wings cause displacements of the antennae based on Coulomb's law. Neurons of the Johnston's organ respond to movements within the range of displacements caused by electric fields. When the antennae were prevented from moving at the joints containing the Johnston's organ, bees no longer responded to biologically relevant electric fields. Honeybees respond differently to different temporal patterns. Honeybees appear to use the electric field emanating from the dancing bee for distance communication.
