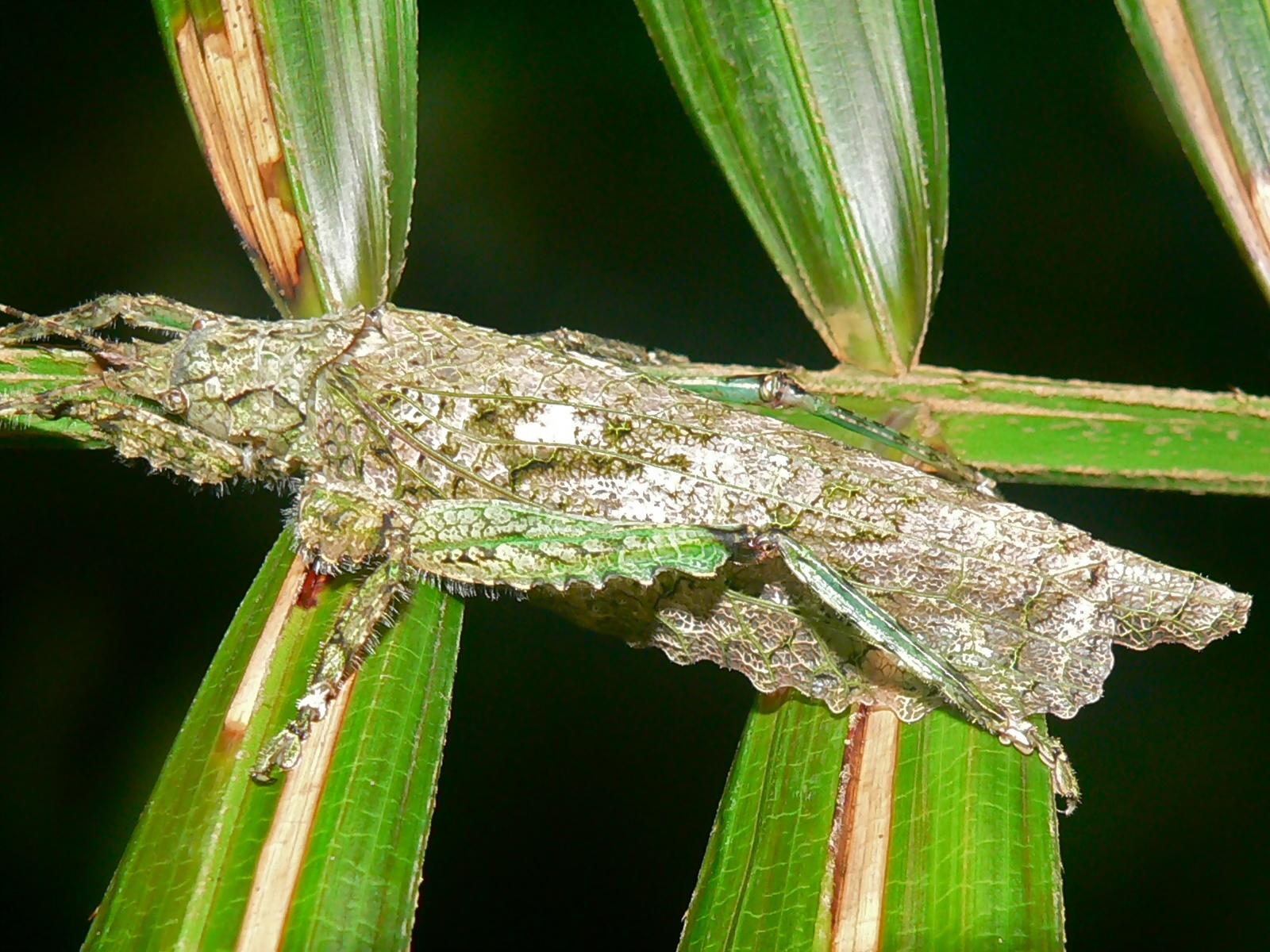
- T. novaehollandiae immunis

Scientific classification
- Kingdom: Animalia
- Phylum: Arthropoda
- Clade: Pancrustacea
- Class: Insecta
- Order: Orthoptera
- Suborder: Ensifera
- Family: Tettigoniidae
- Subfamily: Pseudophyllinae
- Supertribe: Pseudophylliti
- Tribe: Cymatomerini
- Genus: Tegra
- Species: T. novaehollandiae

Binomial name
- Tegra novaehollandiae Haan, 1842

Subspecies
- T.n. viridinotata T.n. novaehollandiae T.n. immunis

Synonyms
- Tegra karnya (Willemse, 1933); Locusta novaehollandiae (Haan, 1842); Tarphe novaehollandiae (Haan, 1842); Tegra novaehollandiae albostriata (de Jong); Tegra novaehollandiae vittifemur (de Jong)

= Tegra novaehollandiae =

Species of cricket-like animal

Tegra novaehollandiae is a species of bush crickets in the tribe Cymatomerini and the subfamily Pseudophyllinae; it is native to tropical Asia.

== Subspecies ==
- T. novaehollandiae viridinotata - India
- T. novaehollandiae novaehollandiae - Malaysia, Sumatra
- T. novaehollandiae immunis - Indo-China, Northern Myanmar

== Habits ==
The subspecies T. n. viridinotata has one generation per year. It overwinters in the trunk of pear trees． Nymph and adult eat the leaves of Glochidion puberum. The eggs are laid in pear trees. The mottled colors and texture if T. n. novaehollandiae allow it to blend into the bark of the trees where it is usually found, motionless, with legs and antennae thrust out in front. Some spots of green on the tegmina are said to resemble moss on the bark.

When its thorax is pinched, T. n. novaehollandiae emits two large drops of a yellow fluid from openings on the dorsal surface of its protonum, as well as smaller amounts from other apertures on its body. The fluid is also produced by the tegmina when they are compressed.

== See also ==
- Poecilocerus pictus, another squirting grasshopper.
- Aularches miliaris, a foam-squirting grasshopper from Myanmar.
- Parasanaa donovani, a grasshopper from north India, squirts a yellow slimy liquid several inches.
