= Parasanaa =

Scientific classification
- Kingdom: Animalia
- Phylum: Arthropoda
- Clade: Pancrustacea
- Class: Insecta
- Order: Orthoptera
- Suborder: Ensifera
- Family: Tettigoniidae
- Subfamily: Pseudophyllinae
- Supertribe: Pseudophylliti
- Tribe: Cymatomerini
- Genus: Parasanaa; Beier, 1944
- Species: P. donovani

Binomial name
- Parasanaa donovani (Donovan, 1834)

Synonyms
- Typhoptera donovani; Gryllus donovani; Capnoptera donovani

Genus of cricket-like animals

Parasanaa is a genus of bush-cricket recorded from India, Indochina, Malesia through to New Guinea. It is represented by a single species, Parasanaa donovani

This insect has also been called Typhoptera donovani, Gryllus donovani and Capnoptera donovani. The species was described by Edward Donovan in 1834.

== Description ==
The adult is black with lemon-yellow patches on the thorax and tegmina.

== Habits ==
It is found throughout August on the cactus on which it feeds. It is heavy and sluggish, generally still by day, nestled among the cactus thorns, with the front legs and the long antennae stretched forward onto the plant's surface, parallel to each other. To escape predators it would rather drop from the cactus than take flight. It is more active at night, when it feeds and moves about.

When the thorax is pinched, the insect squirts a slimy yellow fluid from two slits on the dorsal surface of the mesothorax, with a range of three to four inches. One aperture may discharge at first, and the other after the insect is pinched again. Some fluid also oozes out from other apertures over the body and legs, and also from the stumps of broken-off legs.

== See also ==
- Sanaa, a related genus similar in appearance and geographical distribution
- Poecilocerus pictus, another squirting grasshopper
- Aularches miliaris, a foam-squirting grasshopper from Myanmar
- Tegra novaehollandiae, a liquid-oozing grasshopper
- Bombardier beetle, which squirts a boiling mixture
