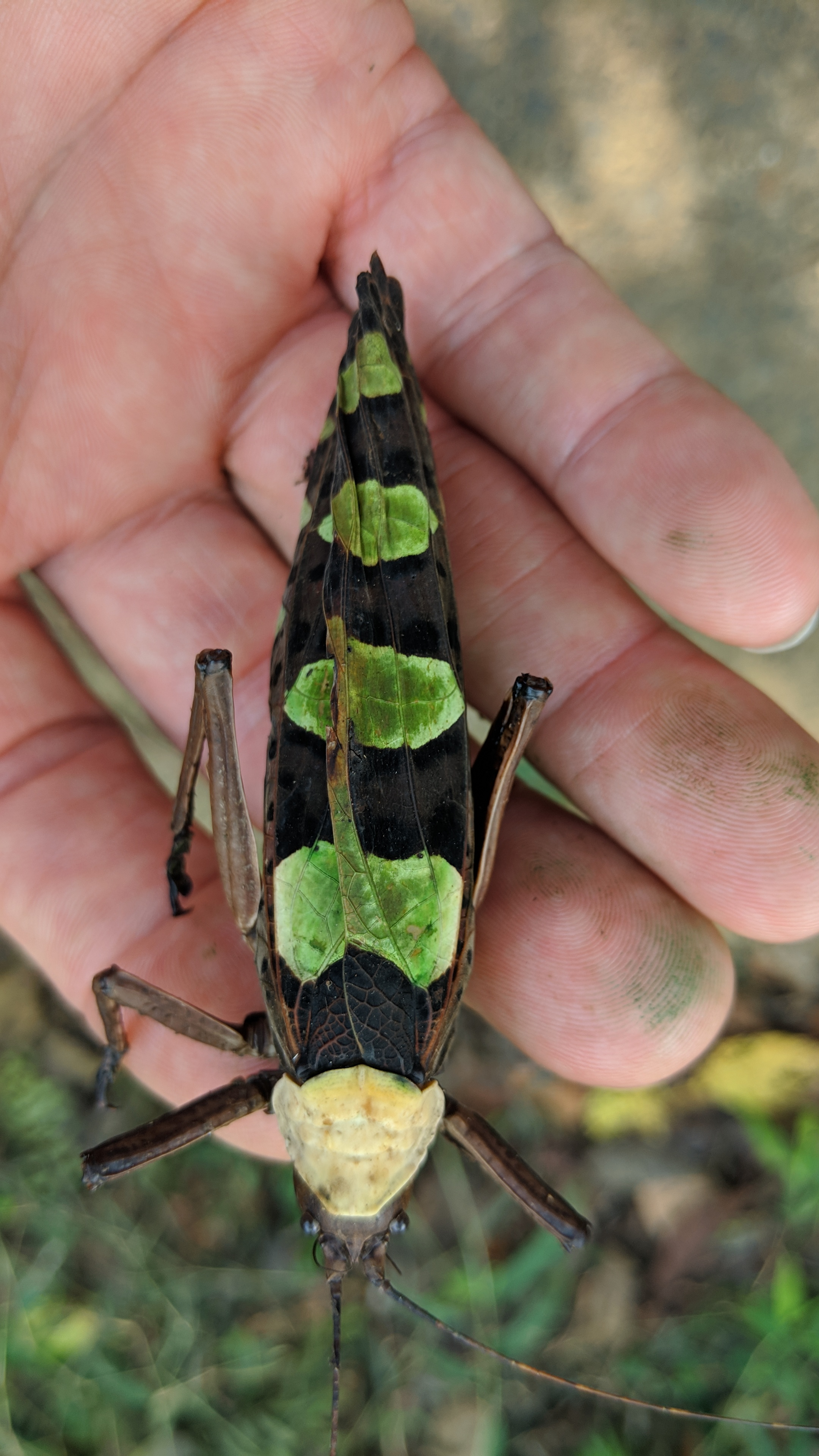
- Sanaa cf. intermedia in Cúc Phương National Park

Scientific classification
- Domain: Eukaryota
- Kingdom: Animalia
- Phylum: Arthropoda
- Class: Insecta
- Order: Orthoptera
- Suborder: Ensifera
- Family: Tettigoniidae
- Subfamily: Pseudophyllinae
- Supertribe: Pseudophylliti
- Tribe: Cymatomerini
- Genus: Sanaa
- Species: S. intermedia

Binomial name
- Sanaa intermedia Beier, 1944

= Sanaa intermedia =

Species of cricket-like animal

Sanaa intermedia is a species of bush-crickets, found in Indo-China. It belongs to the tribe Cymatomerini and the subfamily Pseudophyllinae, with no subspecies listed in the Catalogue of Life.

== Gallery ==
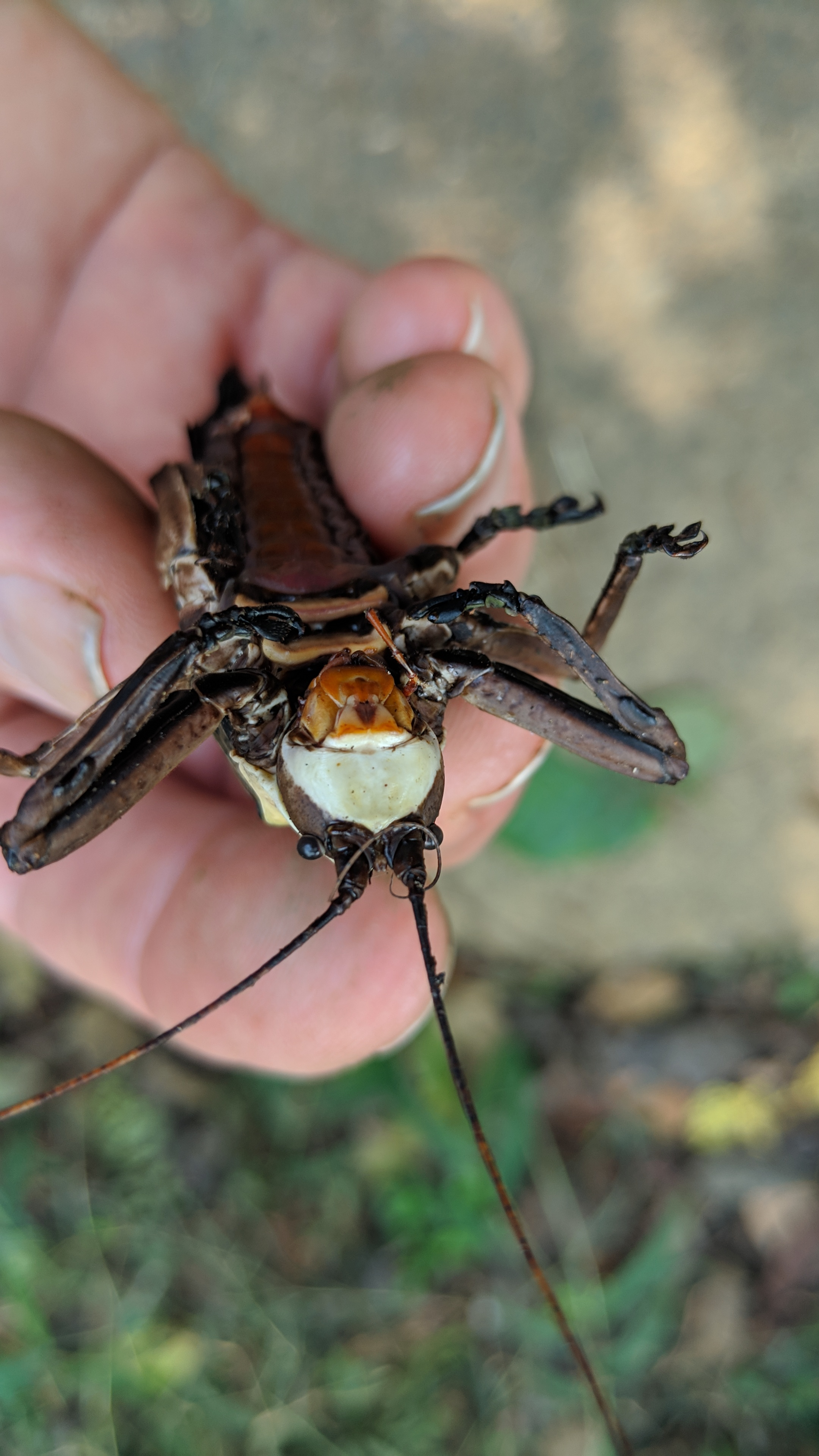

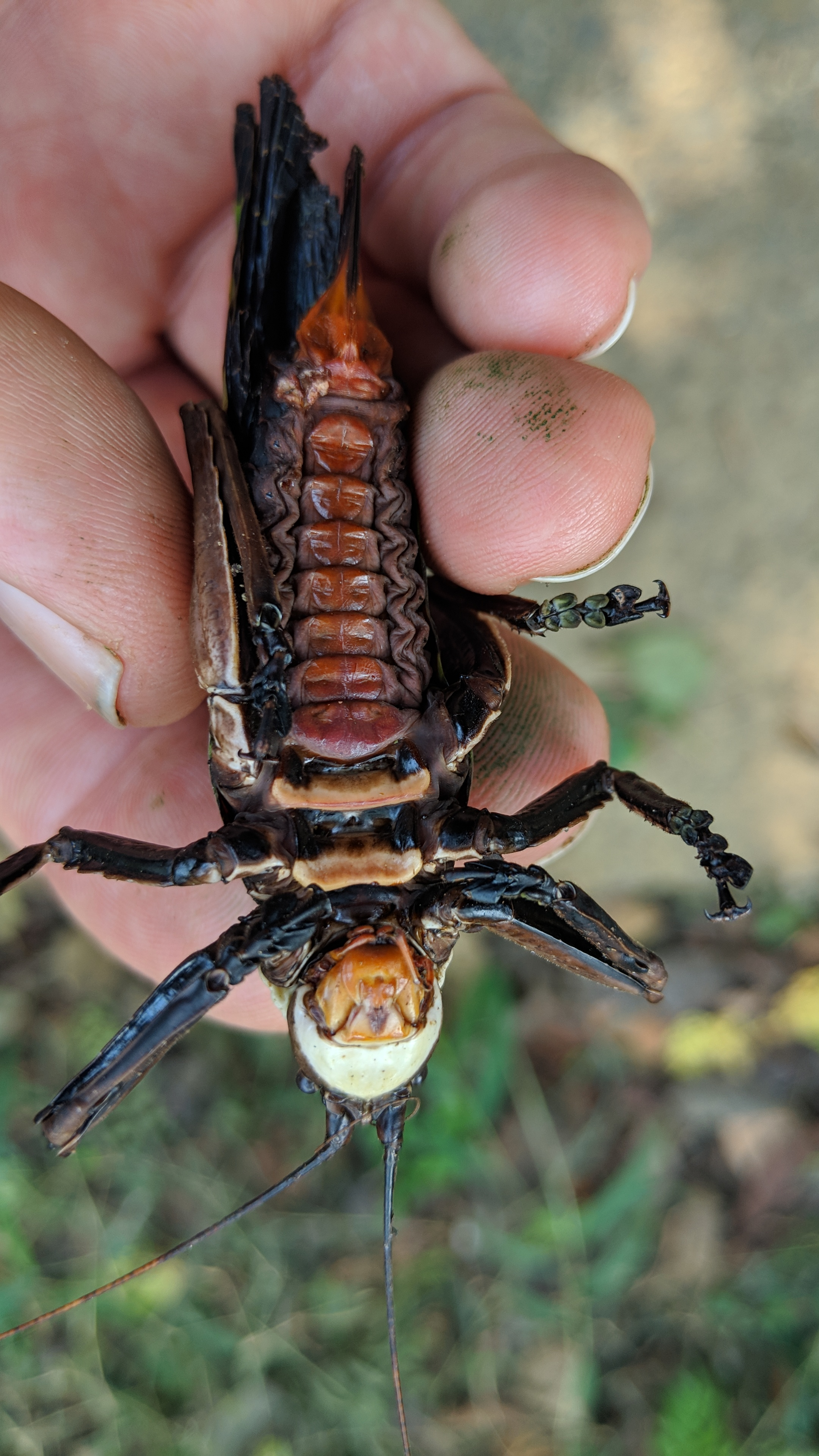

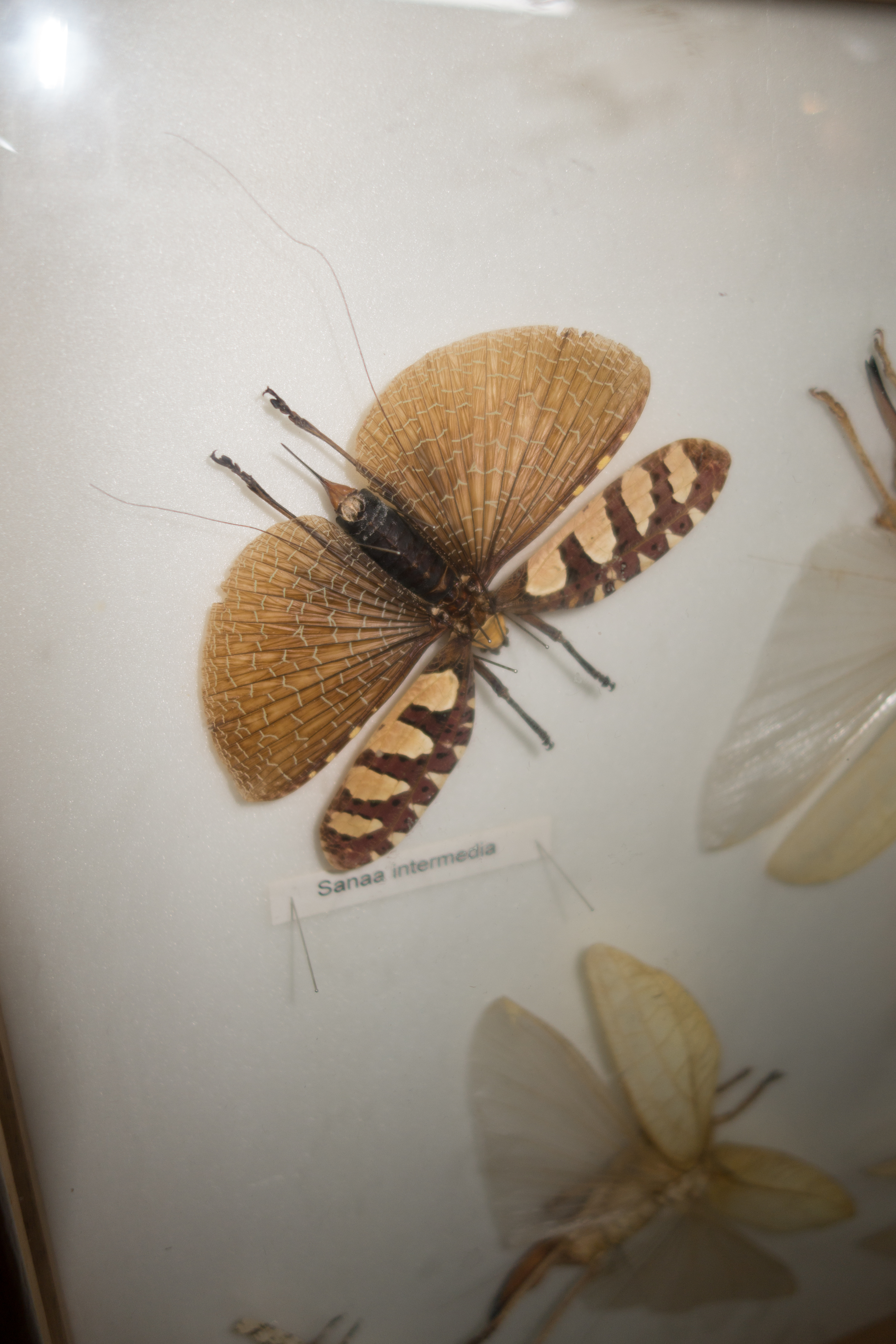
