= Prey naiveté =

Theory

Prey naïveté hypothesis is a theory that suggests that native prey often struggle to recognize or avoid an introduced predator because they lack a coevolutionary history with it. Prey naïveté is believed to intensify the effects of non-native predators, which can contribute significantly to the risk of extinction and endangerment of prey populations.

== Overview ==
The prey naïveté hypothesis suggests that ineffective antipredator defenses result from a lack of evolutionary exposure to specific predators. This naivety towards non-native predators is likely influenced by eco-evolutionary factors such as biogeographic isolation and prey adaptation. A prey species' ability to detect and evade predators can be shaped by the life history, ecology, and evolutionary context of both predator and prey. While some predator-prey systems display species-specific avoidance behaviors, many taxa require learned olfactory recognition of predators. Certain antipredator behaviors that develop in response to coevolved predators may persist over time, even in their absence, particularly when other predators are present, as suggested by the "multipredator hypothesis."

For instance, rats introduced to oceanic islands have been implicated in the extinction of many mammals, birds, and reptiles that lack evolutionary experience with generalist mammalian nest predators. However, the negative effects of rats are lessened on islands with native rats or functionally similar land crabs, as the fauna on these islands appear to be less naïve to the threats posed by introduced omnivores. Prey are generally naïve towards non-native predators in marine and freshwater environments, but not in terrestrial ones. The naïveté was most significant towards non-native predators lacking native relatives in the community. Time since introduction plays a role, with prey naïveté diminishing over generations; approximately 200 generations may be needed for prey to sufficiently develop antipredator behaviors towards these non-native threats.

== Driving factors ==
The occurrence and intensity of prey naiveté are hypothesized to arise from several interrelated factors, categorized into four themes:

- Biogeographic isolation: Prey naiveté is thought to be exacerbated by evolutionary isolation between predator and prey, particularly in freshwater environments. Island ecosystems may also experience heightened naiveté due to lack of eco-evolutionary experience with both non-native and native predators.
- Adaptation over time: Prey may acquire effective antipredator responses over generations following the introduction of a predator, with naiveté diminishing as prey adapt.
- Latitude and biodiversity: The latitude of predator introduction may influence prey recognition, with lower latitudes possibly exhibiting higher recognition rates due to greater predation pressure and biodiversity.
- Taxonomic specificity: Recognition of introduced predators may vary by taxonomic group, suggesting that certain prey species are better equipped to recognize specific predators.

== Levels of prey naiveté ==
Prey naiveté was initially conceptualized as a straightforward phenomenon in which native fauna become vulnerable to non-native predators due to naive behavioral responses. It is now understood to be a multifaceted issue, and is classified into four distinct levels:

Level	Characteristic
Level 1	Prey fail to recognize the non-native predator as a threat, leading to a complete absence of any antipredator behavior. This naiveté can leave them highly vulnerable to predation.
Level 2	Prey acknowledge the presence of the predator but respond with inappropriate behavioral responses, which do not effectively mitigate the threat. This can include ineffective flight or hiding strategies.
Level 3	Prey display behavioral responses that are suitable but ultimately ineffective against the predator. For example, they may attempt to flee or seek refuge, but these actions do not adequately enhance their survival.
Level 4	Prey overreact to the predator, exhibiting heightened fear and anxiety after experiencing significant sublethal predation costs. This can lead to excessive caution that disrupts their normal behavior and ecological functions.

In addition to behavioral inadequacies, prey species lacking evolutionary exposure to non-native predation may possess morphological or physiological traits that render them more susceptible to such threats, including insufficient defensive structures, flightlessness, conspicuous odors, or inadequate camouflage. Although prey naiveté is widely recognized in ecological studies, its variability under the influence of eco-evolutionary factors is not yet fully quantified.

== Impact ==
Prey naïveté contributes significantly to the extinction and endangerment of prey species globally, as well as to the failure of wildlife reintroductions.

=== Mitigation ===
While excluding novel predators from conservation areas has had mixed results, the absence of any predators can worsen prey naiveté. Reintroducing native predators has been proposed as a potential solution to enhance prey behavioral responses. A study published in 2024 assessed the behavioral reactions of two prey species—the burrowing bettong (Bettongia lesueur) and spinifex hopping mouse (Notomys alexis)—to the reintroduction of a native predator, the western quoll (Dasyurus geoffroii), and its impact on their responses to feral cats (Felis catus). Results indicated that quoll-exposed bettongs engaged in less inattentive foraging compared to controls but did not differentiate between predator and non-predator cues. In contrast, quoll-exposed hopping mice adjusted their foraging behaviors in open areas and increased their wariness in response to quoll stimuli, while cat-exposed hopping mice only heightened their caution in the presence of cat stimuli. Although reintroducing native predators improved general antipredator responses among naïve prey populations, evidence for enhanced discrimination towards introduced predators was limited, although the findings suggest that exposure to native predators may better prepare naïve prey for environments where novel predators are present.

A 2019 study explored whether exposing predator-naïve prey, specifically the greater bilby (Macrotis lagotis), to controlled numbers of introduced predators (feral cats, Felis catus) can enhance their survival upon reintroduction. Over two years, bilbies were exposed to feral cats in a fenced area, and their behaviors were assessed. Results showed that predator-exposed bilbies exhibited increased wariness—spending less time moving and more time in cover—compared to naïve bilbies. Following translocation, the predator-exposed group had higher survival rates and was less likely to be preyed upon than their naïve counterparts. The study suggests that training naïve prey in the presence of predators may improve their survival in reintroduction efforts.
