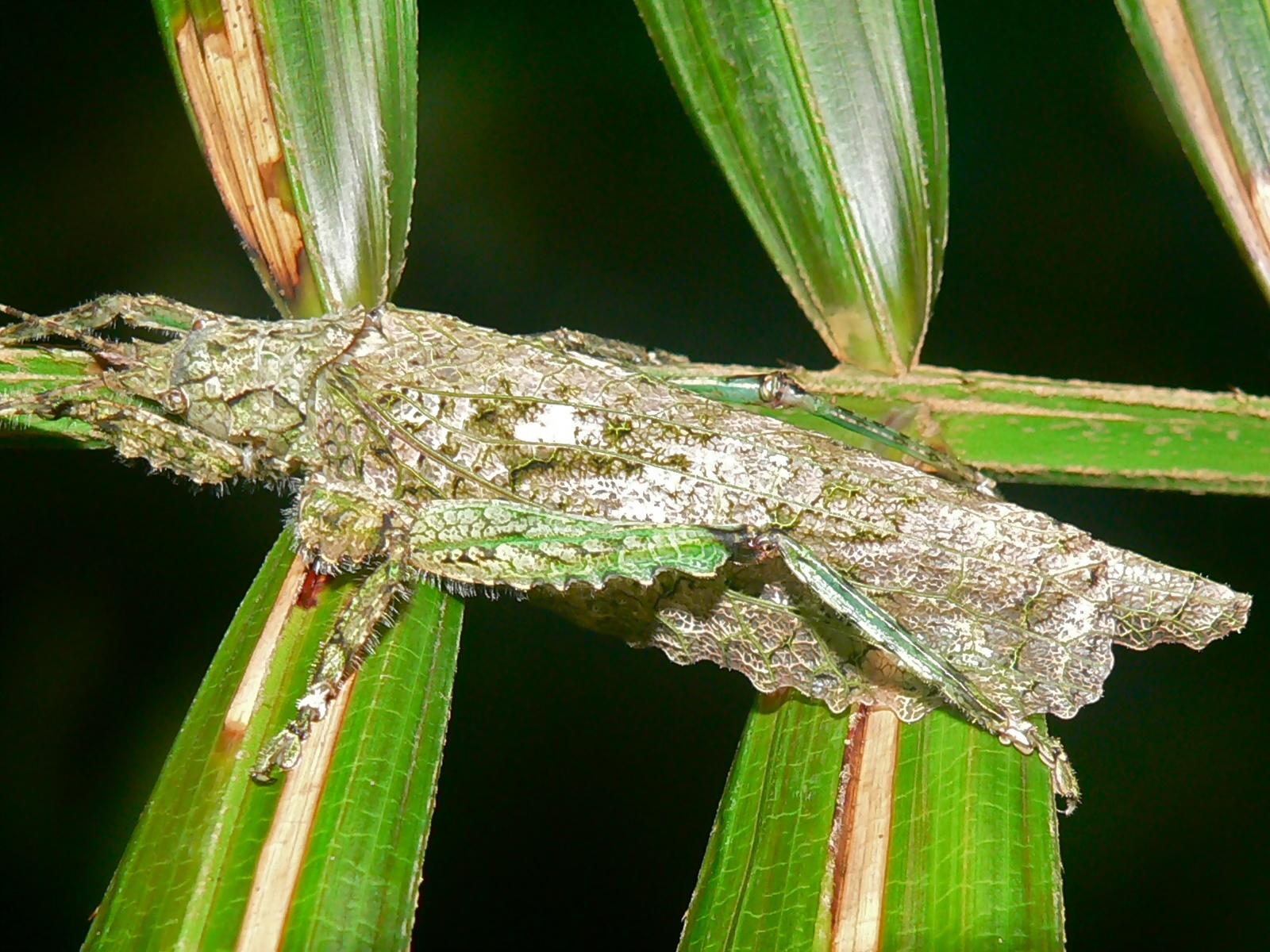
- T. novaehollandiae immunis

Scientific classification
- Kingdom: Animalia
- Phylum: Arthropoda
- Class: Insecta
- Order: Orthoptera
- Suborder: Ensifera
- Family: Tettigoniidae
- Subfamily: Pseudophyllinae
- Tribe: Cymatomerini
- Genus: Tegra; Walker, 1870

= Tegra (katydid) =

Genus of cricket-like animals

Tegra is an Asian genus of bush-crickets in the tribe Cymatomerini and the subfamily Pseudophyllinae.

== Species ==
The Catalogue of Life lists:

1. Tegra novaehollandiae Haan, 1842 - type species (as Locusta novaehollandiae Haan) - 3 subspecies
2. Tegra viridivitta Walker, 1870
