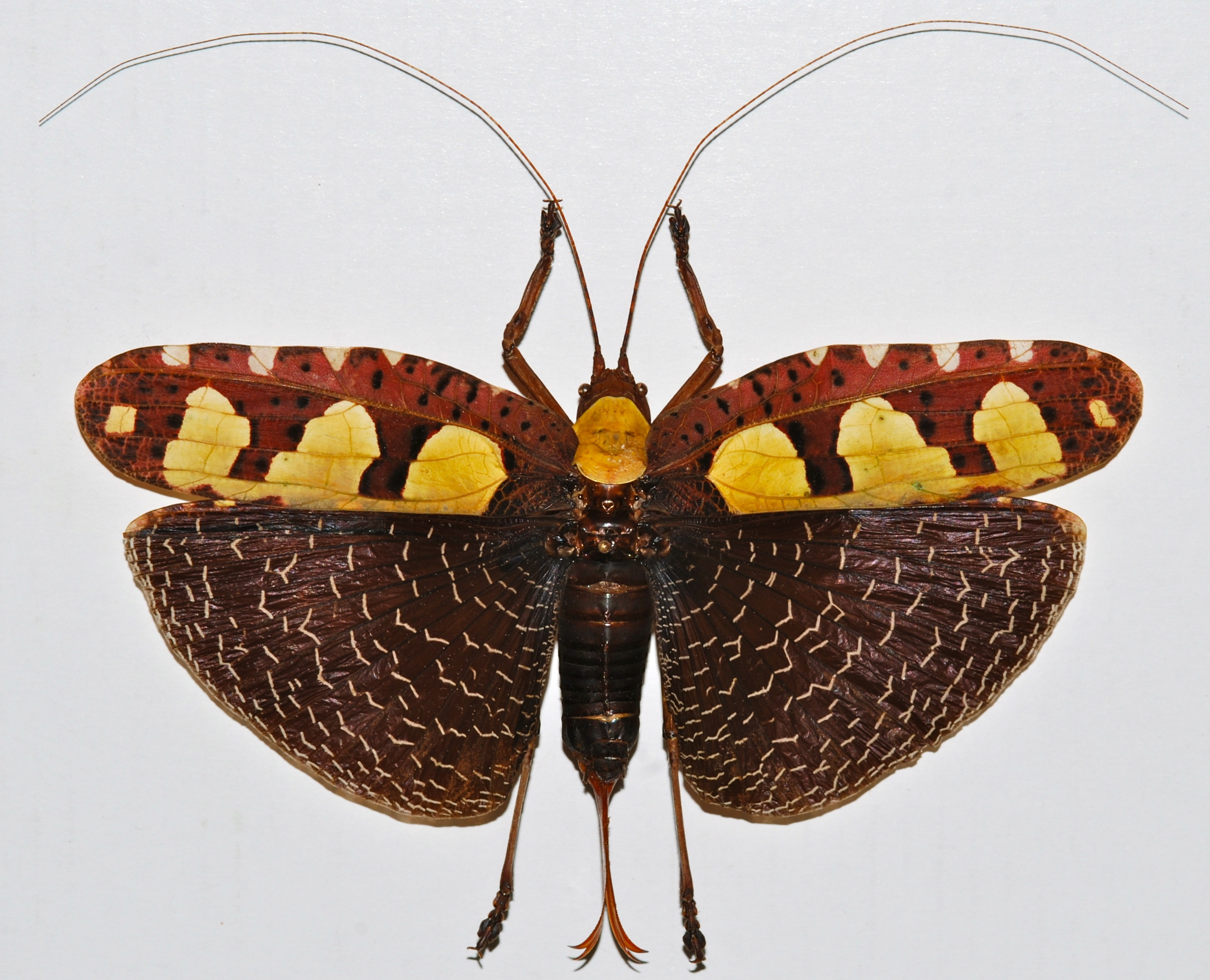

Scientific classification
- Domain: Eukaryota
- Kingdom: Animalia
- Phylum: Arthropoda
- Class: Insecta
- Order: Orthoptera
- Suborder: Ensifera
- Family: Tettigoniidae
- Subfamily: Pseudophyllinae
- Genus: Sanaa
- Species: S. regalis

Binomial name
- Sanaa regalis (Brunner von Wattenwyl, 1895)

Synonyms
- Termera regalis Brunner von Wattenwyl, 1895

= Sanaa regalis =

Species of cricket-like animal

Sanaa regalis is a species of insect in the bush-cricket or katydid family, Tettigoniidae, found in the Himalayas. It was first described in 1895 by Carl Brunner von Wattenwyl as Termera regalis.
