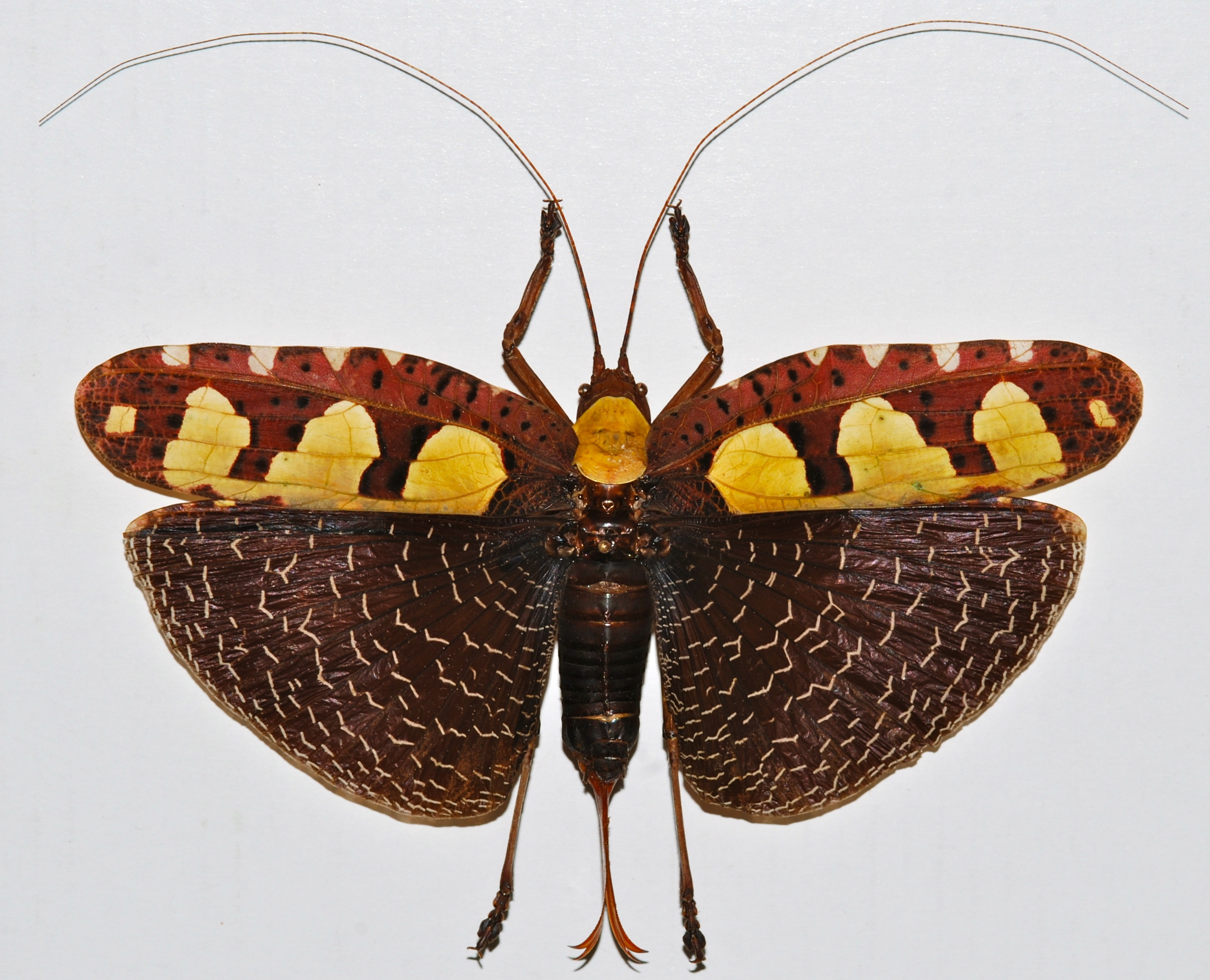
- Sanaa regalis

Scientific classification
- Kingdom: Animalia
- Phylum: Arthropoda
- Class: Insecta
- Order: Orthoptera
- Suborder: Ensifera
- Family: Tettigoniidae
- Subfamily: Pseudophyllinae
- Tribe: Cymatomerini
- Genus: Sanaa; Walker, 1870

Type species
- Locusta imperialis White, 1846

Synonyms
- Sanna Kirby, 1906; Termera Stål, 1874

= Sanaa (katydid) =

Genus of cricket-like animals

Sanaa is a genus of bush-crickets found in India, Indo-China and Malesia. It belongs to the tribe Cymatomerini within the subfamily Pseudophyllinae. It may be confused with the genus Parasanaa, which has a similar distribution in Asia.

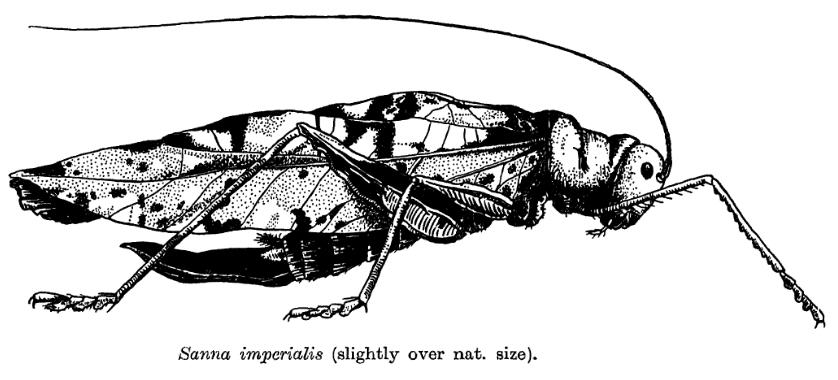
S. imperialis (type species) female

== Species ==
The Orthoptera Species File and Catalogue of Life list:

- Sanaa imperialis (White, 1846)
- Sanaa intermedia Beier, 1944
- Sanaa regalis (Brunner von Wattenwyl, 1895)

Nota bene: A binomial authority in parentheses indicates that the species was originally described in a genus other than Sanaa.
