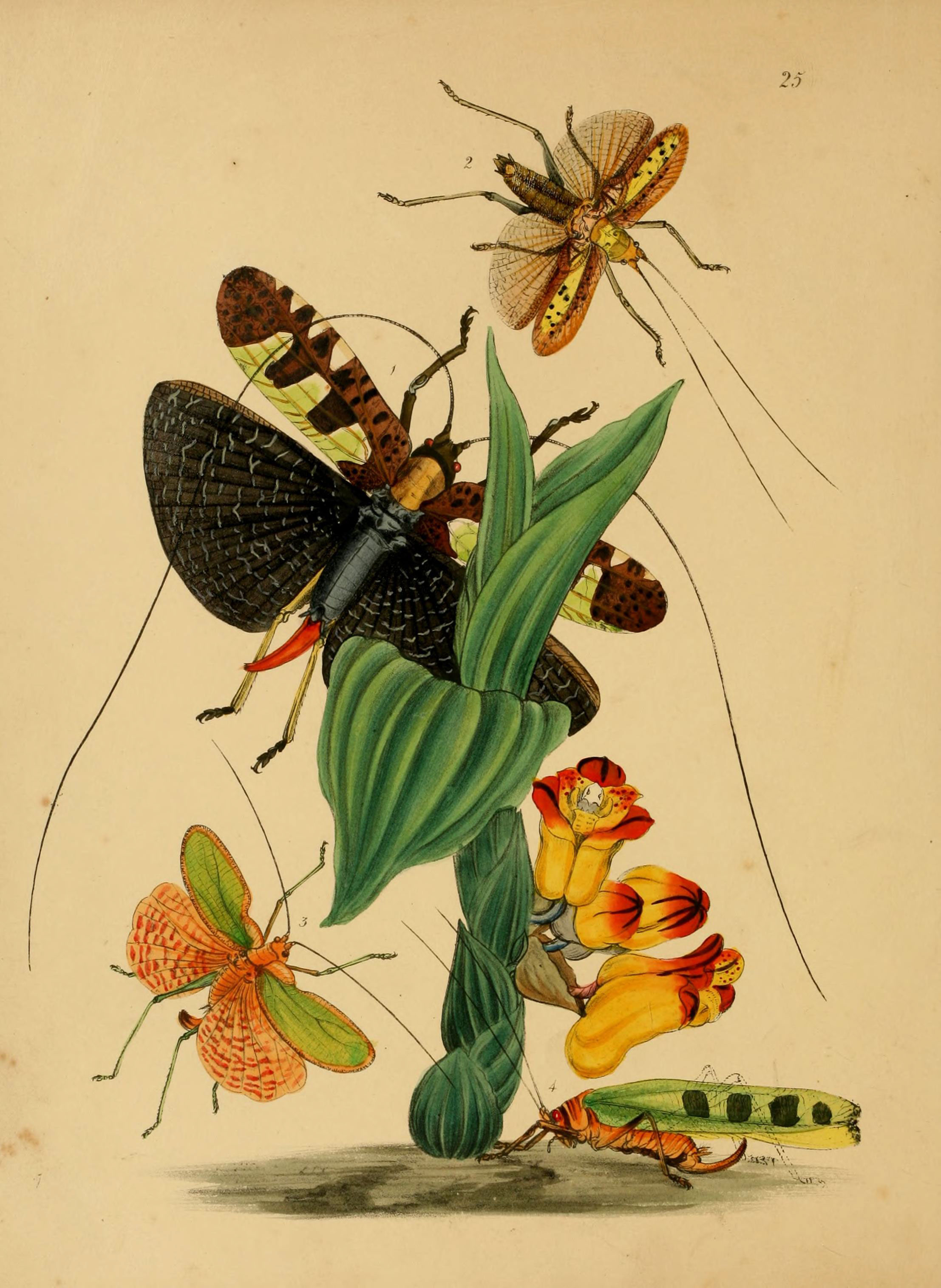
- Illustration from the Cabinet of Oriental Entomology (1848) by J. O. Westwood with Sanaa imperialis (at centre)

Scientific classification
- Domain: Eukaryota
- Kingdom: Animalia
- Phylum: Arthropoda
- Class: Insecta
- Order: Orthoptera
- Suborder: Ensifera
- Family: Tettigoniidae
- Subfamily: Pseudophyllinae
- Supertribe: Pseudophylliti
- Tribe: Cymatomerini
- Genus: Sanaa
- Species: S. imperialis

Binomial name
- Sanaa imperialis (White, 1846)

Synonyms
- Locusta (Acanthodis) imperialis White, 1846; Acanthodis imperialis; Termera imperialis

= Sanaa imperialis =

Species of cricket-like animal

Sanaa imperialis is a species of bush cricket (or katydid) found in the tropical forests of South and Southeast Asia. It was described originally by Adam White from a specimen obtained from Sylhet in Bangladesh. The description was published in 1846 and it was given the name Locusta imperialis. It was moved into the genus Sanaa by Francis Walker in 1870.
