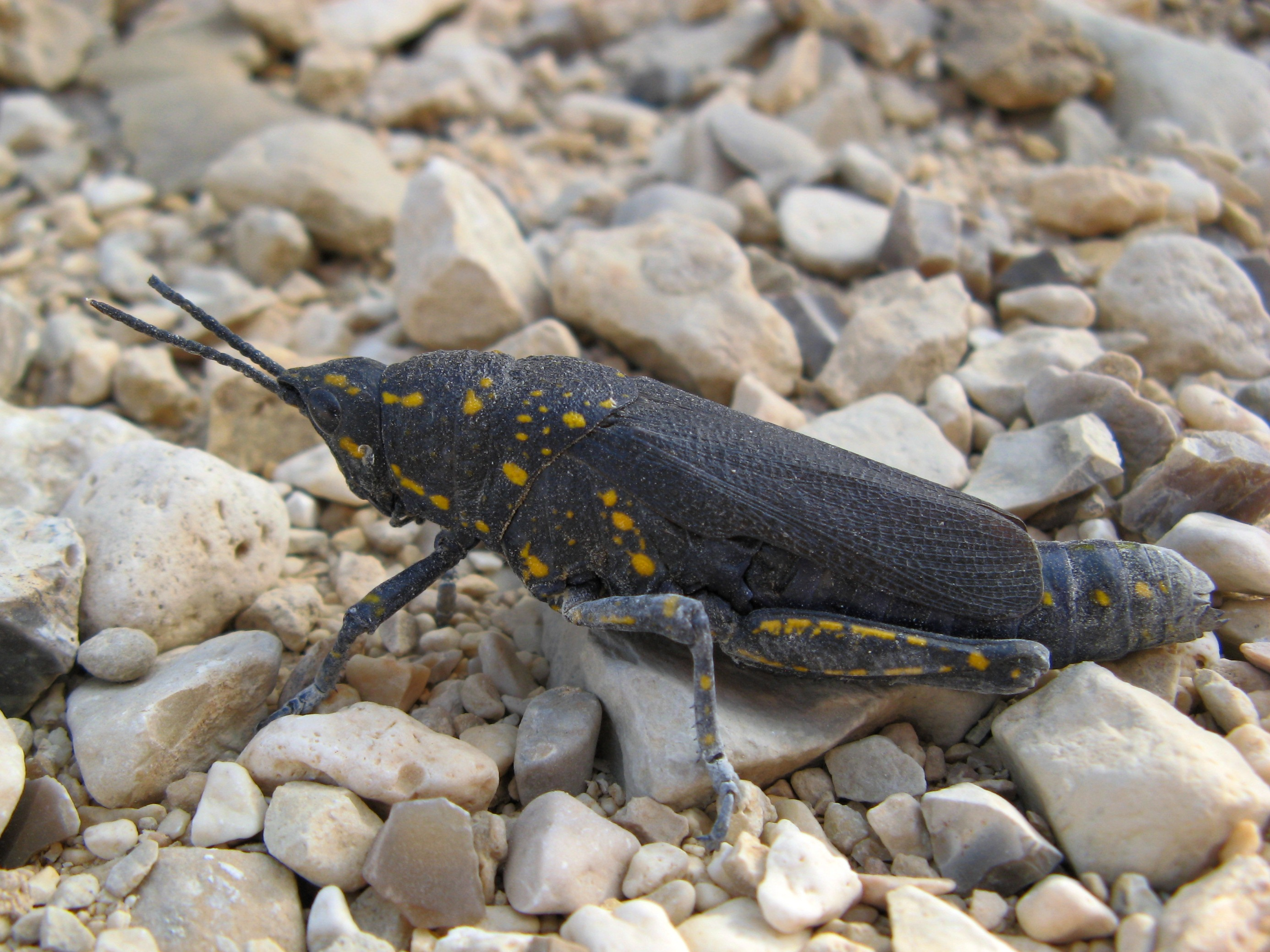

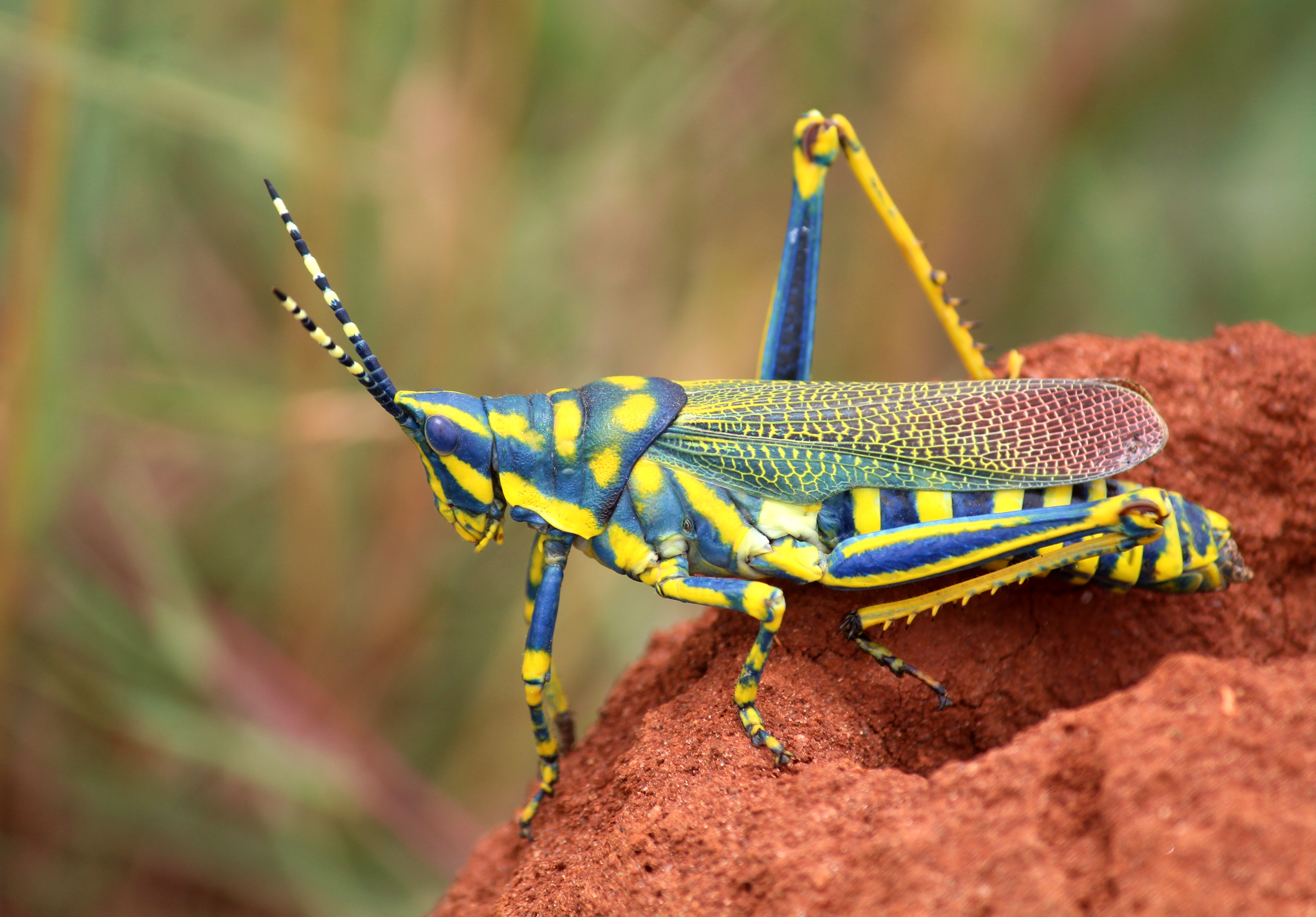
- Poekilocerus bufonius (above), Poekilocerus pictus (below)

Scientific classification
- Kingdom: Animalia
- Phylum: Arthropoda
- Class: Insecta
- Order: Orthoptera
- Suborder: Caelifera
- Family: Pyrgomorphidae
- Subfamily: Pyrgomorphinae
- Tribe: Poekilocerini; Burmeister, 1840
- Genus: Poekilocerus; Serville, 1831

Synonyms
- Decticus Klug, 1832; Paecilocerus Bordas, 1898; Paekilocera Westwood, 1841; Poecilocera Percheron, 1836; Poecilocerus Schaum, 1853; Poekilocera Percheron, 1838

= Poekilocerus =

Genus of grasshoppers

Poekilocerus is a genus of grasshoppers in the family Pyrgomorphidae and the monotypic tribe Poekilocerini. Species are found in the northern half of Africa, and in Southwest and South Asia, often in arid or semi-arid areas.

Adults are typically about 3–7 cm (1.2–2.8 in) long, with females generally larger than males of the same species. The genus includes both highly toxic species with contrasting aposematic colours and species with duller colours suitable for camouflage.

== Species ==
The Orthoptera Species File lists the following:

1. Poekilocerus arabicus Uvarov, 1922
2. Poekilocerus bufonius Klug, 1832 (3 subspecies)
3. Poekilocerus calotropidis Karsch, 1888
4. Poekilocerus geniplanus Gupta & Chandra, 2016
5. Poekilocerus pictus (Fabricius, 1775) - type species (as Gryllus pictus Fabricius)
