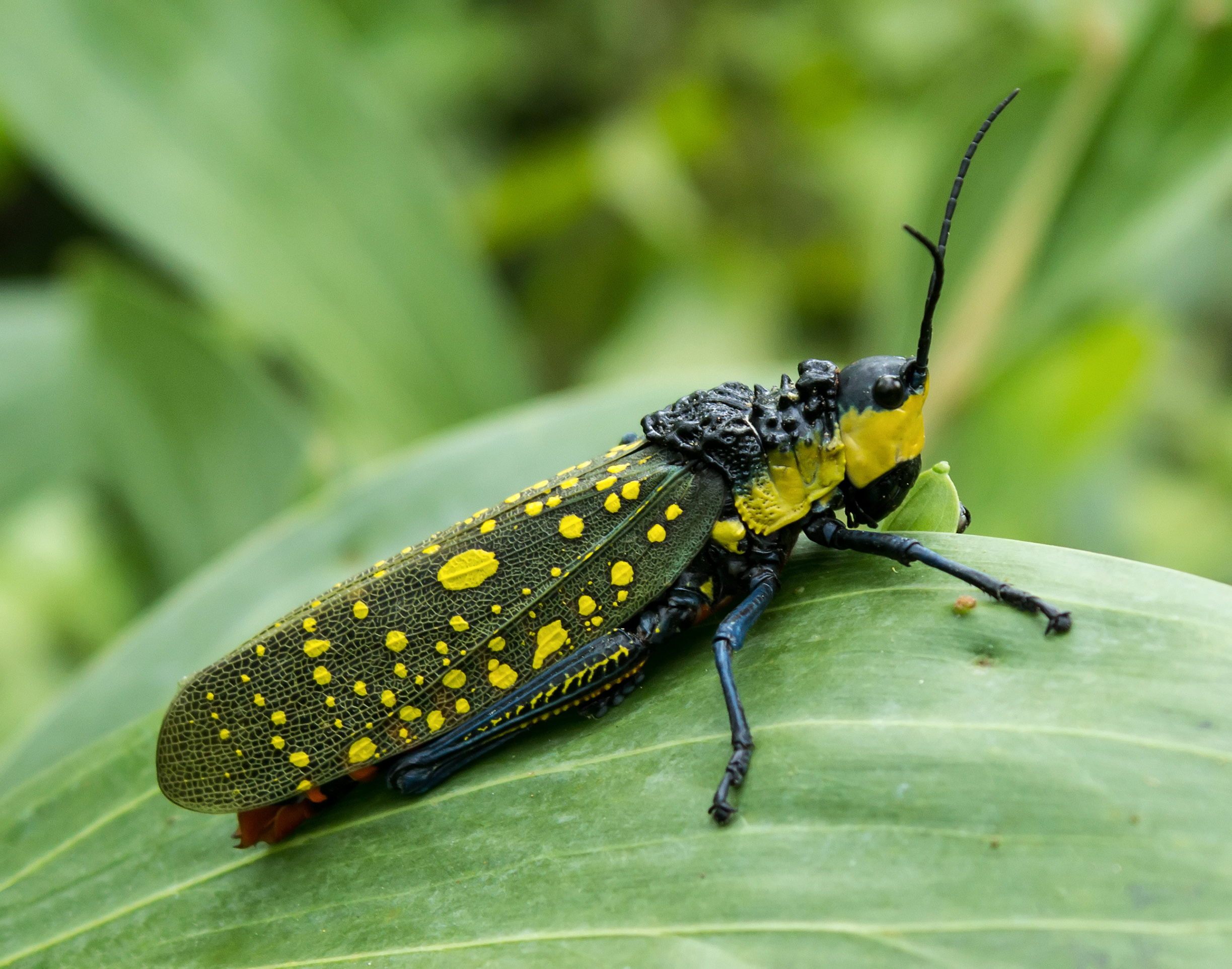

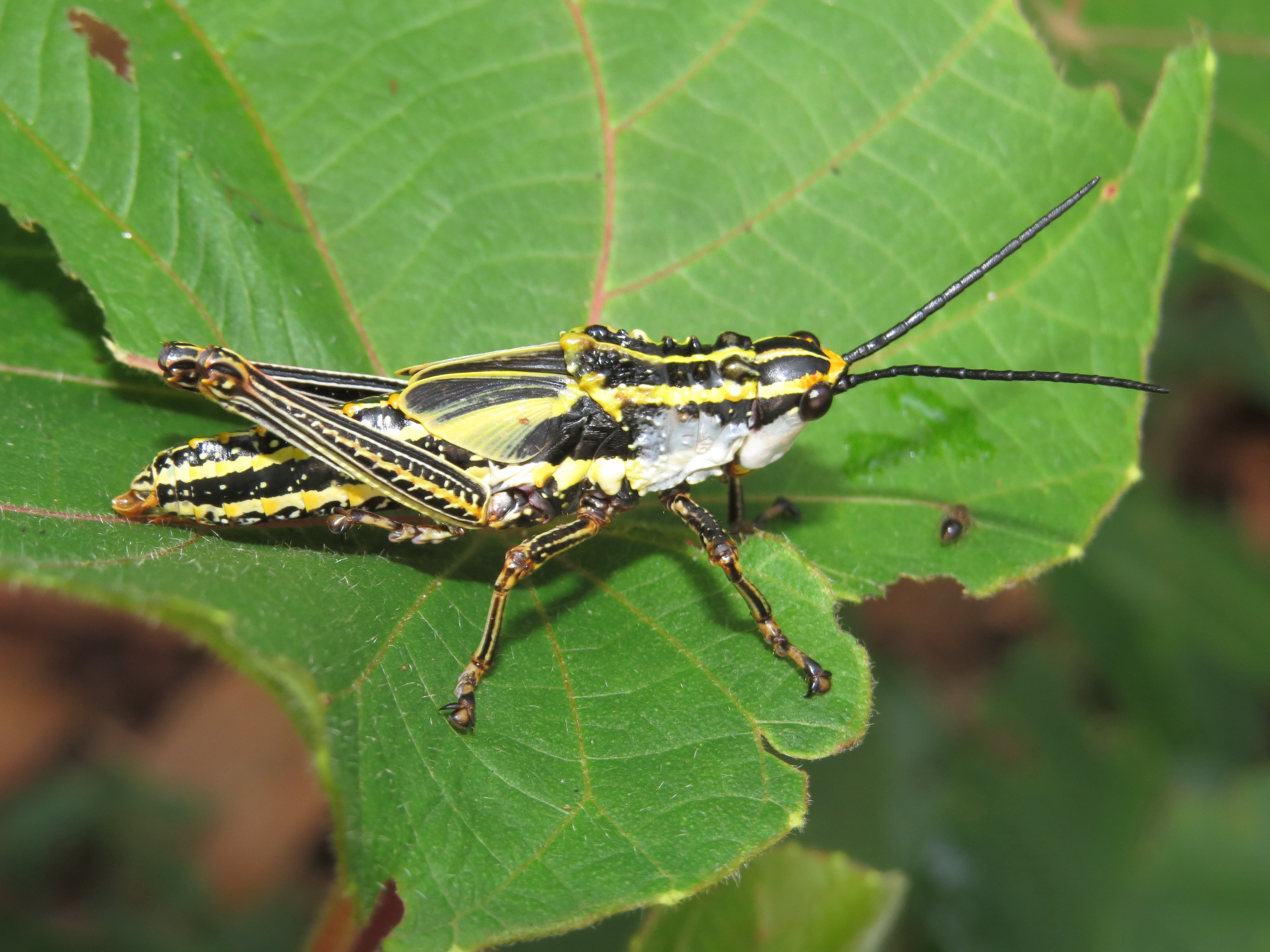
- Adult above (Java, Indonesia), nymph below (Kerala, South India)

Scientific classification
- Kingdom: Animalia
- Phylum: Arthropoda
- Clade: Pancrustacea
- Class: Insecta
- Order: Orthoptera
- Suborder: Caelifera
- Family: Pyrgomorphidae
- Subfamily: Pyrgomorphinae
- Tribe: Taphronotini
- Genus: Aularches; Stål, 1873
- Species: A. miliaris

Binomial name
- Aularches miliaris (Linnaeus, 1758)

Synonyms
- Gryllus conspersus Houttuyn, 1813; Gryllus punctatus Drury, 1770; Gryllus scabiosus Fabricius, 1793; Acrydium verrucosus De Geer, 1773

= Aularches =

Genus of grasshopper

Aularches miliaris is a grasshopper species of the monotypic genus Aularches, belonging to the family Pyrgomorphidae. A native of South and Southeast Asia, the bright warning colours of this fairly large grasshopper keep away predators and their defense when disturbed includes the ejection of a toxic foam.

The insect has been called by a variety of names including coffee locust, ghost grasshopper, northern spotted grasshopper, and foam grasshopper, and enjoys some popularity as a pet insect.

== Description ==
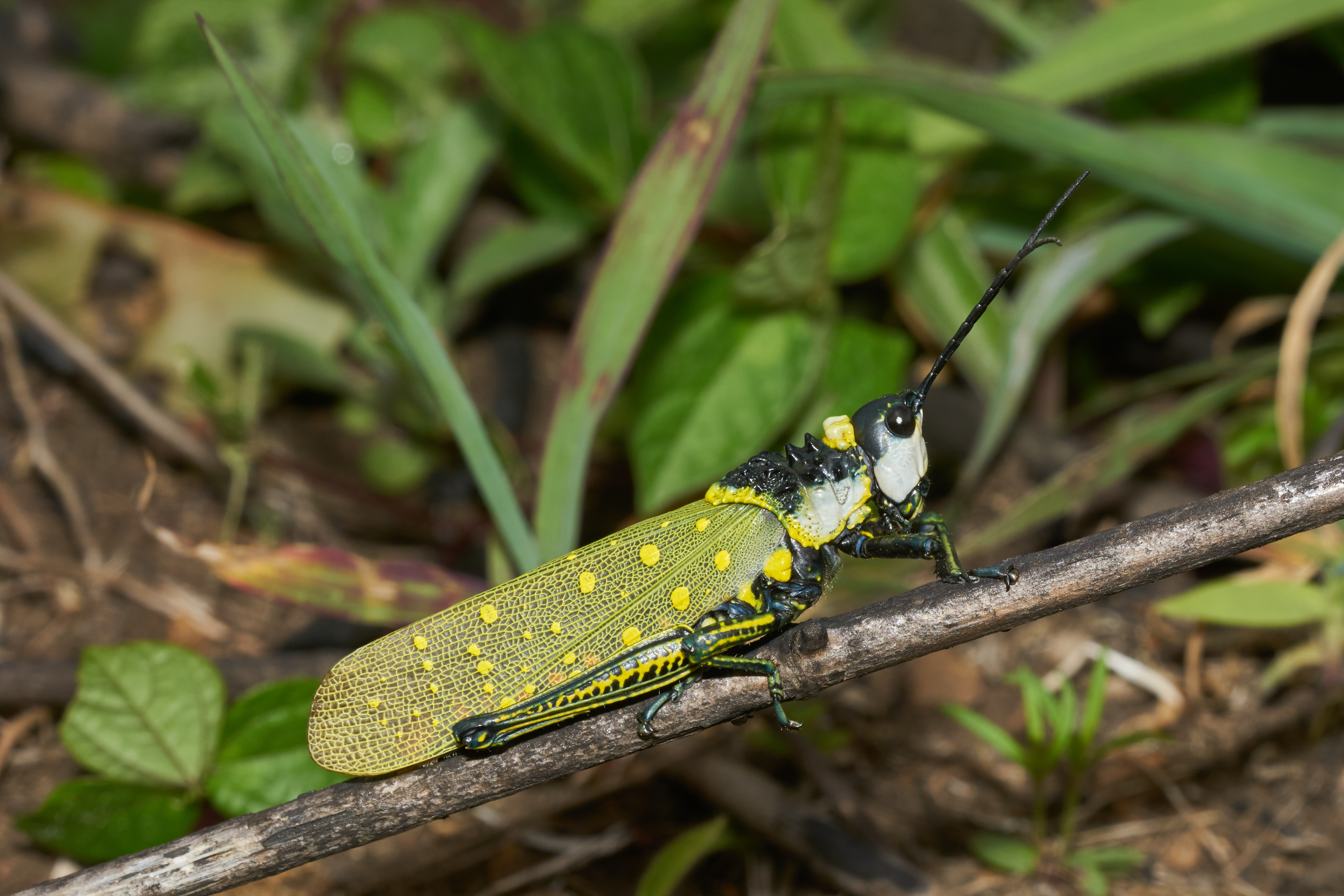
Adult in Kerala, South India

Adult males are typically 3.7–5.5 cm (1.5–2.2 in) long and females typically 4.7–6.9 cm (1.9–2.7 in). The head and thorax are dark green with a canary-yellow band on the side. The tegmina are green with many yellow spots; the legs are blue, with a yellow serrated pattern on the hind femora. The abdomen is black with bright red bands.

== Subspecies and distribution ==
There are two subspecies:

- A. miliaris miliaris (Linnaeus, 1758) - India to Indo-China
- A. miliaris pseudopunctatus Kevan, 1974 - Pakistan

== Habits ==
It swarms in October, the mating and egg-laying season, collecting on bushes and grasses. It is heavy and sluggish, able to make only short leaps, very visible on vegetation. Outbreaks leading to this species damaging cultivated crops are uncommon.

When A. miliaris (of either sex) is disturbed or grabbed, it emits a sharp rasping noise from its thoracic segments. If its thorax is pinched, it also squirts a clear viscous mucus with unpleasant smell and a bitter taste, faintly alkaline, with many embedded bubbles. This foam comes out as a strong jet from apertures in the thorax, and more gently from other openings in the body (ten in total); it heaps up around the insect and partly covers it.

== Conservation ==
Autarchies miliaris, like many other grasshoppers, are considered a pest in agricultural areas. The species is overall widespread and common; however it is near threatened in the Western Ghats of South India. A. miliaris lays eggs in the soil which aerates the soil promoting biodiversity and creates ecosystem value. Their interactions and natural process contribute to the health of the soil. The presence of a variety of insects in the soil are indicators of soil quality. There are a few conservation efforts for this species. At times of high population, growth can be controlled by tilling the area where they deposit their egg pods or collecting the grasshoppers; pesticides are effective; however they are normally not environmentally friendly and can cause damage to other animals and vegetation. Lack of awareness among the residents regarding the entomofauna diversity has led to the misidentification of Autarchies miliaris as the plague causing locust species at many instances and evoked panic among local farmers.
