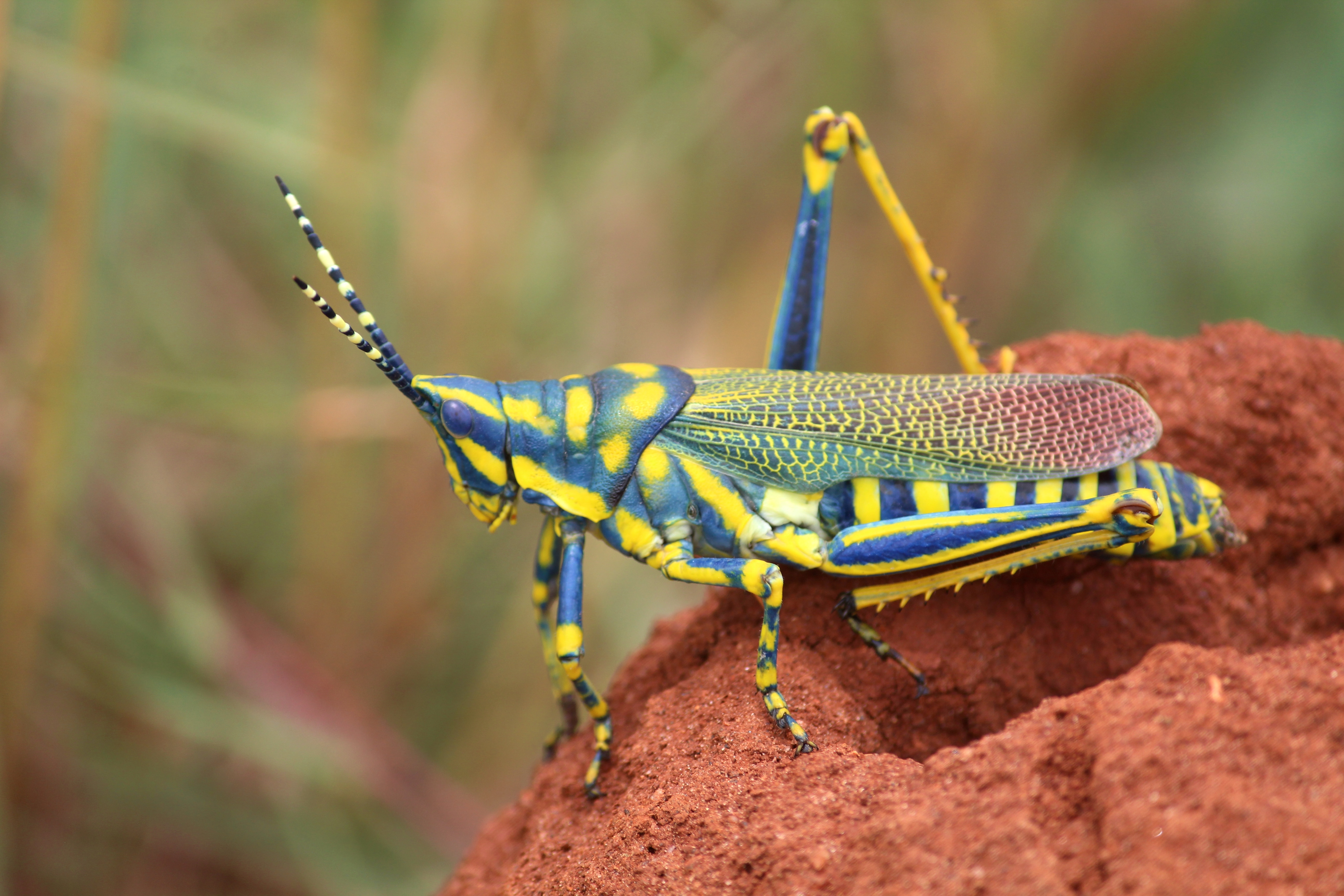

Scientific classification
- Kingdom: Animalia
- Phylum: Arthropoda
- Class: Insecta
- Order: Orthoptera
- Suborder: Caelifera
- Family: Pyrgomorphidae
- Subfamily: Pyrgomorphinae
- Tribe: Poekilocerini
- Genus: Poekilocerus
- Species: P. pictus

Binomial name
- Poekilocerus pictus (Fabricius, 1775)

Synonyms
- Poekilocerus sonnerati Serville, 1831; Poecilocerus tessellatus Bolívar, 1904

= Poekilocerus pictus =

Painted Grasshopper

Species of grasshopper

Poekilocerus pictus, the painted grasshopper, aak grasshopper or ak grasshopper, is a fairly large and brightly coloured species of grasshopper found in India, Pakistan and Afghanistan, especially in drier regions. Both adults and nymphs are toxic; the nymphs are notorious for being able to squirt a jet of noxious liquid at up to around 30 cm (1 ft) away when grasped.

P. pictus was long regarded as the only Poekilocerus of the Indian subcontinent (other species are found in Southwest Asia and Africa), but in 2016 a new species, the overall yellowish-brown P. geniplanus, was described from Chhattisgarh.

== Description ==
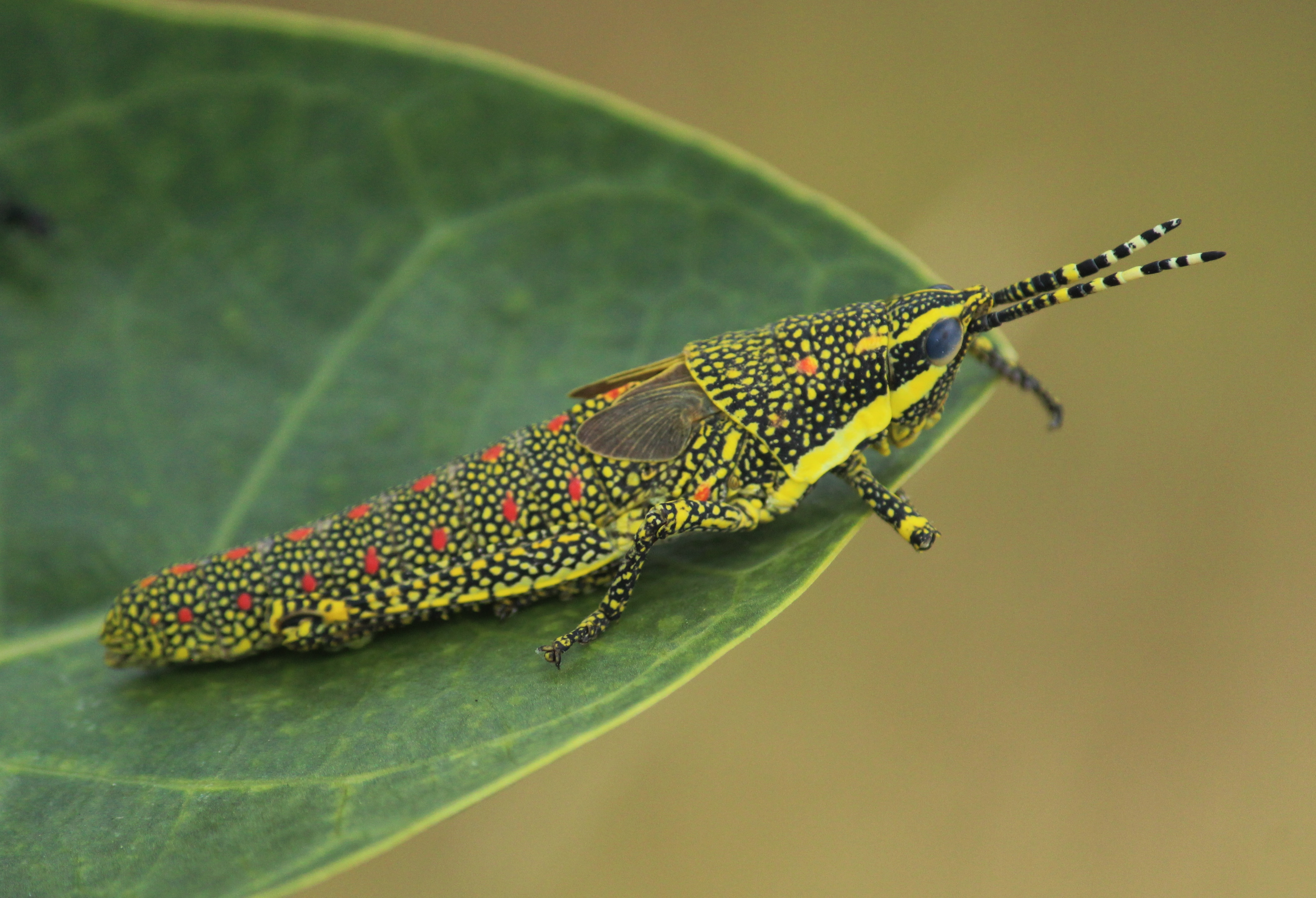
Nymph

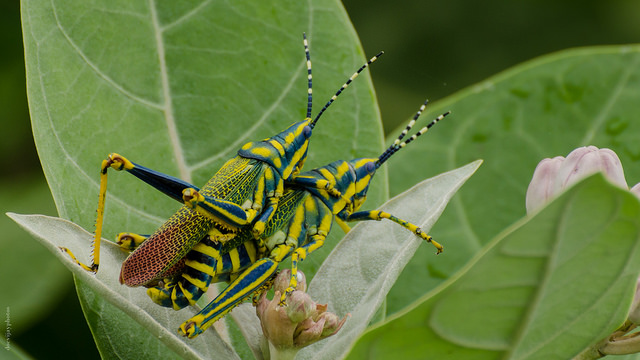
Mating pair

Adults of P. pictus typically are 4.3–6.1 cm (1.7–2.4 in) long. The nymphs are greenish-yellow with fine black markings and small crimson spots. The mature grasshopper has canary yellow and turquoise or blue stripes on its body, green tegmina with yellow spots, and pale red or orange hind wings.

== Feeding and toxicity ==
Both adults and nymphs of P. pictus feed extensively on poisonous Calotropis milkweeds, notably C. gigantea and C. procera, gaining their own toxins from the plants. When given the choice, both adults and nymphs tend to prefer C. procera over C. gigantea. However, both adults and nymphs of P. pictus may also feed on a wide range of other plants, including several that are important agricultural crops, and for this reason they are sometimes regarded as a serious pest. When nymphs mainly feed on other plants than Calotropis milkweeds, their development is not as fast, but the first couple of instars tend to still prefer various weeds over Calotropis if given the choice. The common name aak grasshopper or ak grasshopper is based on the local name of the main food plants, Calotropis gigantea and C. procera. If starving, cannibalism is a regular occurrence.

Upon slight pinching of the head or abdomen, the nymphs ejects liquid in a sharp and sudden jet, with a range of up to around 30 cm (1 ft) or more, from a dorsal opening between the first and second abdominal segments. The discharge is directed towards the pinched area and may be repeated several times. The liquid is pale and milky, slightly viscous with an unpleasant smell and taste, containing cardiac glycosides that the insect obtains from the plant it feeds upon. In the adults, the discharge occurs under the tegmina and collects as viscous bubbly heap along the sides of the body, lacking the squirting effect seen in nymphs.

== Research ==
P. pictus females produce a sex pheromone that is secreted from a thin sac-like gland in the metathoracic segment.

P. pictus has an inducible chromosomal repair mechanism that acts in meiotic cells.
