= Acrophyllum =

Acrophyllum may refer to:

- Acrophyllum (plant), a plant genus
- Acrophyllum, a common misspelling of the katydid genus name Acyrophyllum
