= Xiphophyllum =

Xiphophyllum may refer to:

- Xiphophyllum (katydid), a genus of katydids in the family Tettigoniidae
- Xiphophyllum, a former genus of plants in the family Orchidaceae; now a synonym of Cephalanthera
- Acacia xiphophylla, commonly known as snakewood, a tree in the family Fabaceae
- Cephalanthera xiphophyllum, a species of orchid
