= Tympanophyllum =

Scientific classification
- Domain: Eukaryota
- Kingdom: Animalia
- Phylum: Arthropoda
- Class: Insecta
- Order: Orthoptera
- Suborder: Ensifera
- Family: Tettigoniidae
- Subfamily: Pseudophyllinae
- Tribe: Phyllomimini
- Genus: Tympanophyllum; Krauss, 1902

Type species
- Tympanoptera extraordinaria (Brunner von Wattenwyl, 1895)

Synonyms
- Tympanoptera Brunner von Wattenwyl, 1895

Genus of cricket-like animals

Tympanophyllum is a genus of Southeast Asian bush-crickets in the tribe Phyllomimini within the subfamily Pseudophyllinae. Species have been recorded from India, through Indo-China and Malesia to New Guinea. The genus was named in 1902.

== Species ==
The Orthoptera Species File lists the following 2 subgenera:

Tympanophyllum (Anaprion) Uvarov, 1939

1. Tympanophyllum auriculatum Gorochov & Voltshenkova, 2002
2. Tympanophyllum citreum Gorochov & Voltshenkova, 2002
3. Tympanophyllum imperfectum (de Jong, 1939)
4. Tympanophyllum javanicum (Brunner von Wattenwyl, 1895)
5. Tympanophyllum maculiventris (Beier, 1954)
6. Tympanophyllum maximum (Rehn, 1906)
7. Tympanophyllum porrectum (Walker, 1870)
8. Tympanophyllum semivitreum (Serville, 1838)
9. Tympanophyllum virescens (Serville, 1838)

Tympanophyllum (Tympanophyllum) Krauss, 1902

1. Tympanophyllum arcufolium (Haan, 1842)
  – type species: locality near Padang, Sumatra (as Tympanoptera extraordinaria Brunner von Wattenwyl, 1895: locality Borneo)
2. Tympanophyllum atroterminatum (Brunner von Wattenwyl, 1895)
3. Tympanophyllum montanum Beier, 1954
4. Tympanophyllum timanthoides de Jong, 1939

Note: A binomial authority in parentheses indicates that the species was originally described in a genus other than Tympanophyllum.
