= Macrochiton =

Scientific classification
- Kingdom: Animalia
- Phylum: Arthropoda
- Clade: Pancrustacea
- Class: Insecta
- Order: Orthoptera
- Suborder: Ensifera
- Family: Tettigoniidae
- Subfamily: Pseudophyllinae
- Supertribe: Pleminiiti
- Tribe: Leptotettigini
- Genus: Macrochiton; Redtenbacher, 1895

Species
- See text

Genus of katydids

Macrochiton is a genus of katydids in the family Tettigoniidae.

== Species ==
- Macrochiton adjutor Brunner von Wattenwyl, 1895
- Macrochiton heros Brunner von Wattenwyl, 1895
- Macrochiton macromelos Montealegre-Z. & Morris, 1999
- Macrochiton pallidespinosus Brunner von Wattenwyl, 1895
