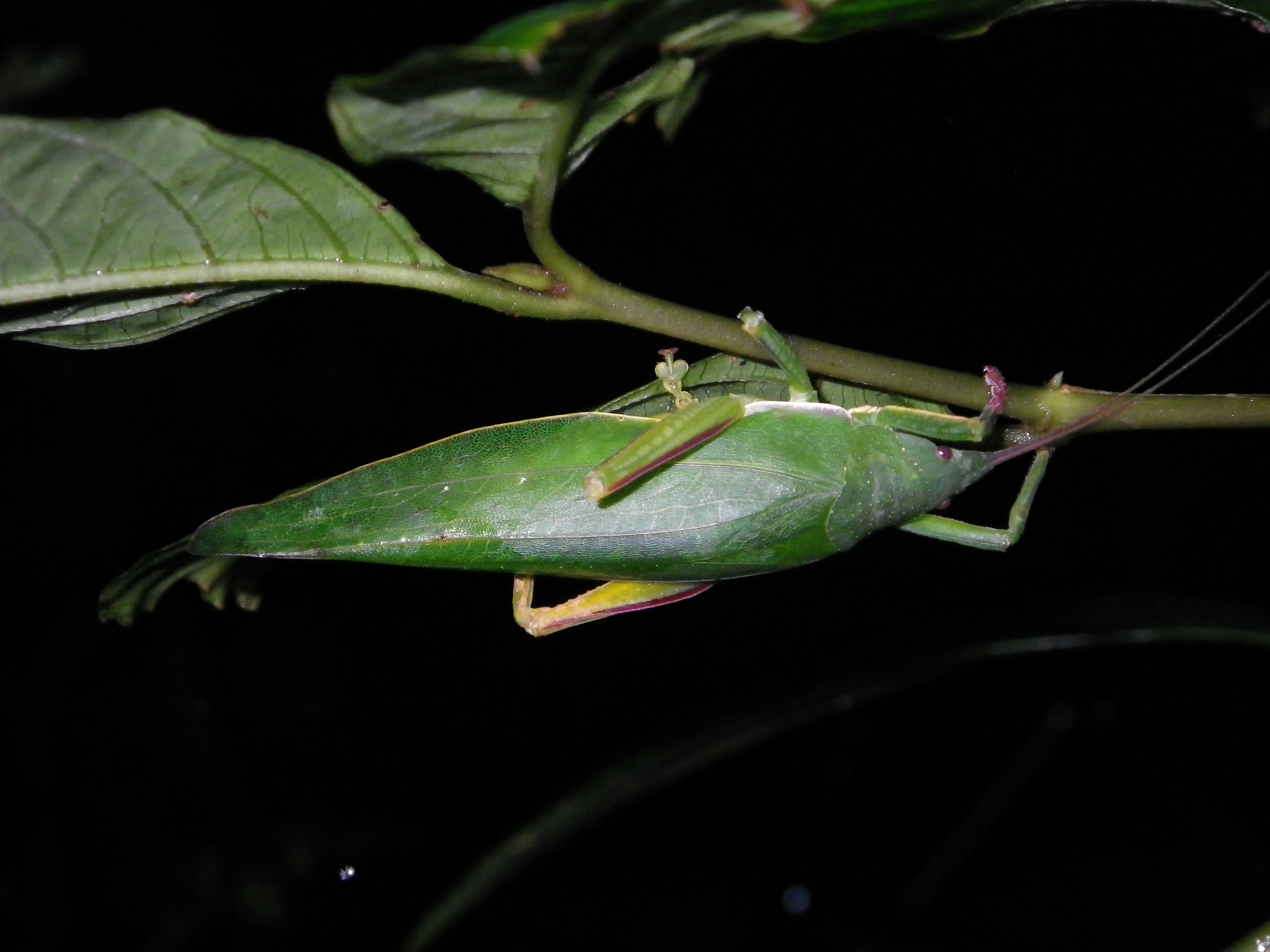
- Phyllomimus sinicus

Scientific classification
- Kingdom: Animalia
- Phylum: Arthropoda
- Clade: Pancrustacea
- Class: Insecta
- Order: Orthoptera
- Suborder: Ensifera
- Family: Tettigoniidae
- Subfamily: Pseudophyllinae
- Tribe: Phyllomimini
- Genus: Phyllomimus; Stål, 1873

Synonyms
- subgenus Phyllomimus: Microprion Pictet & Saussure, 1892; Togona Matsumura & Shiraki, 1908

= Phyllomimus =

Genus of cricket-like animals

External image
- Images at iNaturalist

Phyllomimus is an Asian genus of bush-crickets in the tribe Phyllomimini of the subfamily Pseudophyllinae; species have been recorded from India, China, Indochina and Malesia.

== Species ==
The Orthoptera Species File lists:

subgenus Phyllomimulus Beier, 1954

- Phyllomimus assimilis Walker, 1869
- Phyllomimus temnophylloides Karny, 1924
- Phyllomimus unicolor Brunner von Wattenwyl, 1895

subgenus Phyllomimus Stål, 1873

- Phyllomimus acutipennis Brunner von Wattenwyl, 1895
- Phyllomimus ampullaceus Haan, 1842
- Phyllomimus apterus Brunner von Wattenwyl, 1895
- Phyllomimus bakeri Karny, 1921
- Phyllomimus borneensis Beier, 1954
- Phyllomimus coalitus Xia & Liu, 1991
- Phyllomimus curvicauda Bey-Bienko, 1955
- Phyllomimus detersus (Walker, 1869)
  type species (as P. granulosus Stål, 1873; locality "Cochinchina")
- Phyllomimus elliptifolius Pictet & Saussure, 1892
- Phyllomimus inquinatus Brunner von Wattenwyl, 1895
- Phyllomimus inversus Brunner von Wattenwyl, 1895
- Phyllomimus klapperichi Beier, 1954
- Phyllomimus musicus Carl, 1914
- Phyllomimus mutilatus Brunner von Wattenwyl, 1895
- Phyllomimus nodulosus Bolívar, 1900
- Phyllomimus pallidus Brunner von Wattenwyl, 1895
- Phyllomimus purpuratus Karny, 1924
- Phyllomimus reticulosus Stål, 1877
- Phyllomimus sinicus Beier, 1954
- Phyllomimus sublituratus Walker, 1869
- Phyllomimus tonkinae Hebard, 1922
- Phyllomimus truncatus Brunner von Wattenwyl, 1893
- Phyllomimus verruciferus Beier, 1954
- Phyllomimus zebra Karny, 1920
