= Hemigyrus =

Scientific classification
- Domain: Eukaryota
- Kingdom: Animalia
- Phylum: Arthropoda
- Class: Insecta
- Order: Orthoptera
- Suborder: Ensifera
- Family: Tettigoniidae
- Subfamily: Pseudophyllinae
- Tribe: Phyllomimini
- Genus: Hemigyrus; Brunner von Wattenwyl, 1893

Genus of cricket-like animals

External image
- Image at iNaturalist

Hemigyrus is an Asian genus of bush-crickets in the tribe Phyllomimini and the subfamily Pseudophyllinae. Species have been recorded from: southern China and Indo-China.

== Species ==
The Orthoptera Species File lists:

subgenus Hemigyrus Brunner von Wattenwyl, 1893

- Hemigyrus acutifolius Brunner von Wattenwyl, 1895
- Hemigyrus amplus Brunner von Wattenwyl, 1893 - type species
- Hemigyrus annamensis Gorochov & Voltshenkova, 1998
- Hemigyrus minor Gorochov & Kang, 2003
- Hemigyrus tonkinensis Beier, 1954

subgenus Tomomima Bey-Bienko, 1955

- Hemigyrus major Gorochov & Kang, 2003
- Hemigyrus sonorus Gorochov & Voltshenkova, 2001
- Hemigyrus spinosus (Bey-Bienko, 1955)
