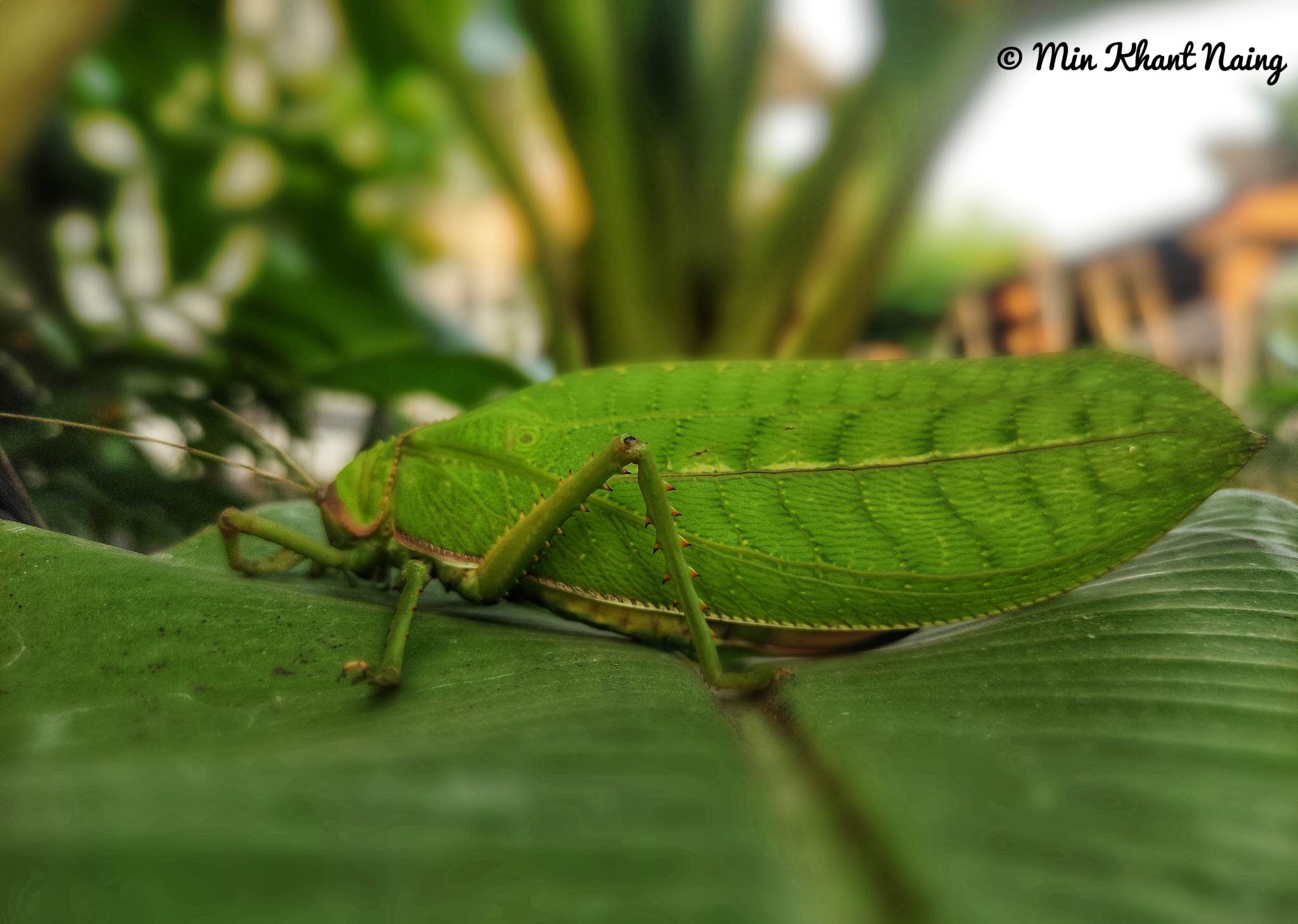
- Pseudophyllus titan

Scientific classification
- Kingdom: Animalia
- Phylum: Arthropoda
- Clade: Pancrustacea
- Class: Insecta
- Order: Orthoptera
- Suborder: Ensifera
- Family: Tettigoniidae
- Subfamily: Pseudophyllinae; Burmeister, 1840

Tribes
- See text

= Pseudophyllinae =

Subfamily of cricket-like animals

The subfamily Pseudophyllinae contains numerous species in the family Tettigoniidae, the katydids or bush crickets. Sometimes called "true katydids", together with the crickets of suborder Ensifera, they form part of the insect order Orthoptera which also contains grasshoppers.

Members of the group are noted for their remarkable camouflage. Many species closely resemble fresh or dried leaves, including veins, various blotches and even bite marks.

== Systematics ==
The Pseudophyllinae may be subdivided into the following tribes (the first 17 of which are sometimes grouped into the super-tribes: Pleminiiti and Pseudophylliti) and genera. Some notable species are also listed here:

=== Aphractini ===
Auth.: (Brunner von Wattenwyl 1895) - Chile

- Aphractus Redtenbacher, 1895
- Paraphractus Beier, 1962
- Polycleptidella Beier, 1962
- Polycleptis Karsch, 1891

=== Aspidonotini ===
Auth.: (Brunner von Wattenwyl 1895) - Madagascar

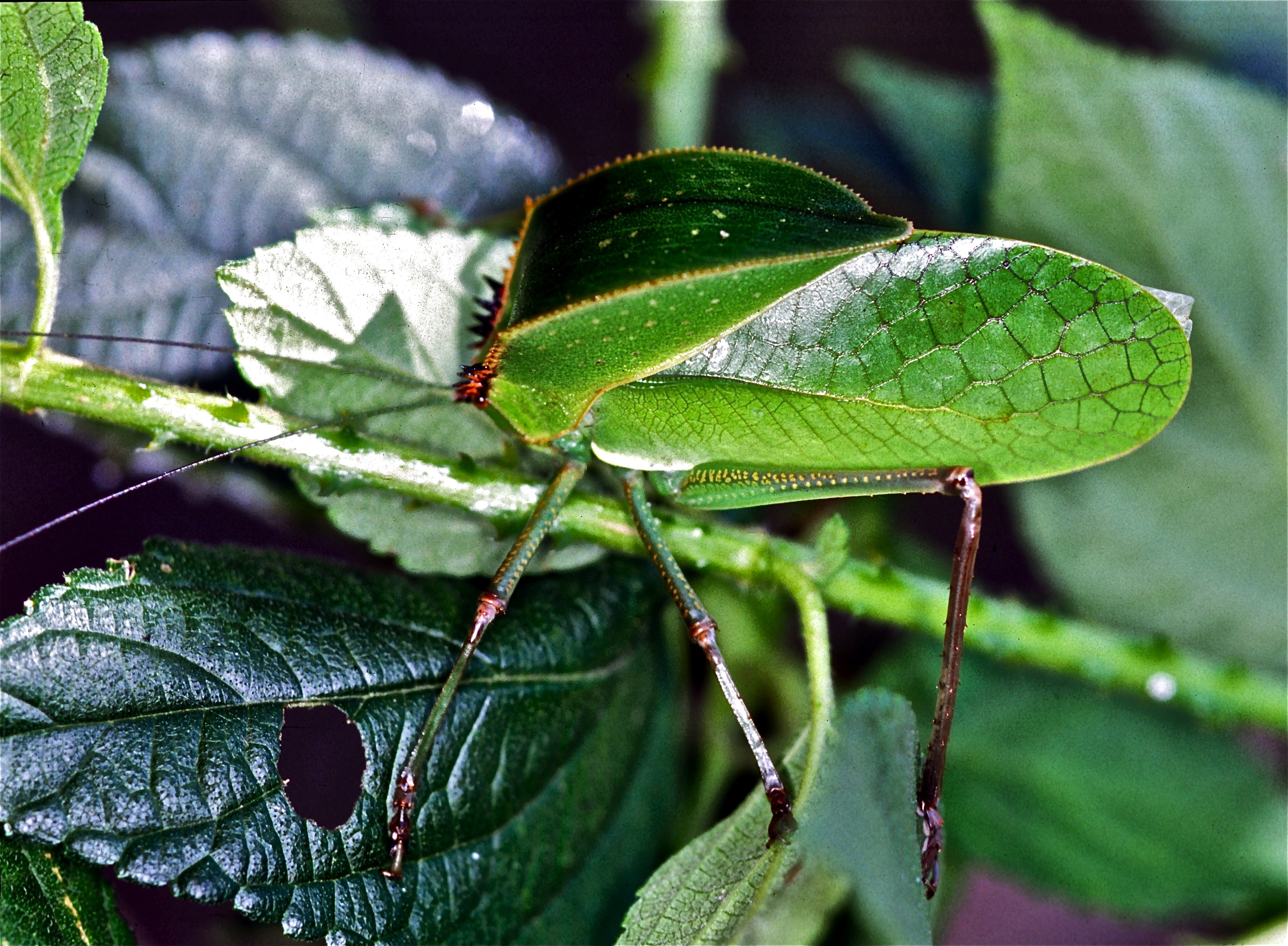
Aspidonotus spinosus

- Aspidonotus Brullé, 1835

=== Callimenellini ===
Auth.: (Gorochov 1990) - Asia: including India, Indo-China and the Philippines

- Callimenellus Walker, 1871

=== Cocconotini ===
Auth.: (Brunner von Wattenwyl 1895) - Central and southern America

- Beierotettix Özdikmen, 2007
- Bliastes Stål, 1873
- Bliastonotideus Beier, 1962
- Bliastonotus Beier, 1960
- Brachybliastes Beier, 1960
- Calamoptera Saussure, 1861
- Chrysobliastes Beier, 1960
- Cobalotettix Beier, 1962
- Cocconotus Stål, 1873
- Cojedebius Kevan, 1989
- Diplopygia Beier, 1962
- Docidocercus Beier, 1960
- Eubliastes Beier, 1960
- Geonotus Beier, 1960
- Helicocercus Beier, 1960
- Idiarthron Brunner von Wattenwyl, 1895
- Incanotus Beier, 1960
- Jamaicoecia Beier, 1962
- Leiobliastes Beier, 1960
- Liparoscelis Stål, 1873
- Liparoscella Hebard, 1933
- Melanonotus Brunner von Wattenwyl, 1895
- Meroncidius Serville, 1831
- Mystron Montealegre-Z. & Morris, 1999
- Nannonotus Beier, 1960
- Nannotettix Redtenbacher, 1895
- Nastonotus Bolívar, 1890
- Natagaima Beier, 1960
- Nesoecia Scudder, 1893
- Nesonotus Beier, 1960
- Schedocentrus Hebard, 1924
- Sphaeropyga Beier, 1960
- Stenotettix Stål, 1873
- Thamnobates Saussure & Pictet, 1898
- Trichotettix Stål, 1873

=== Cymatomerini ===
Auth.: (Brunner von Wattenwyl 1895) - Central Africa and Asia: including India, Indo-China, Malesia and the Philippines

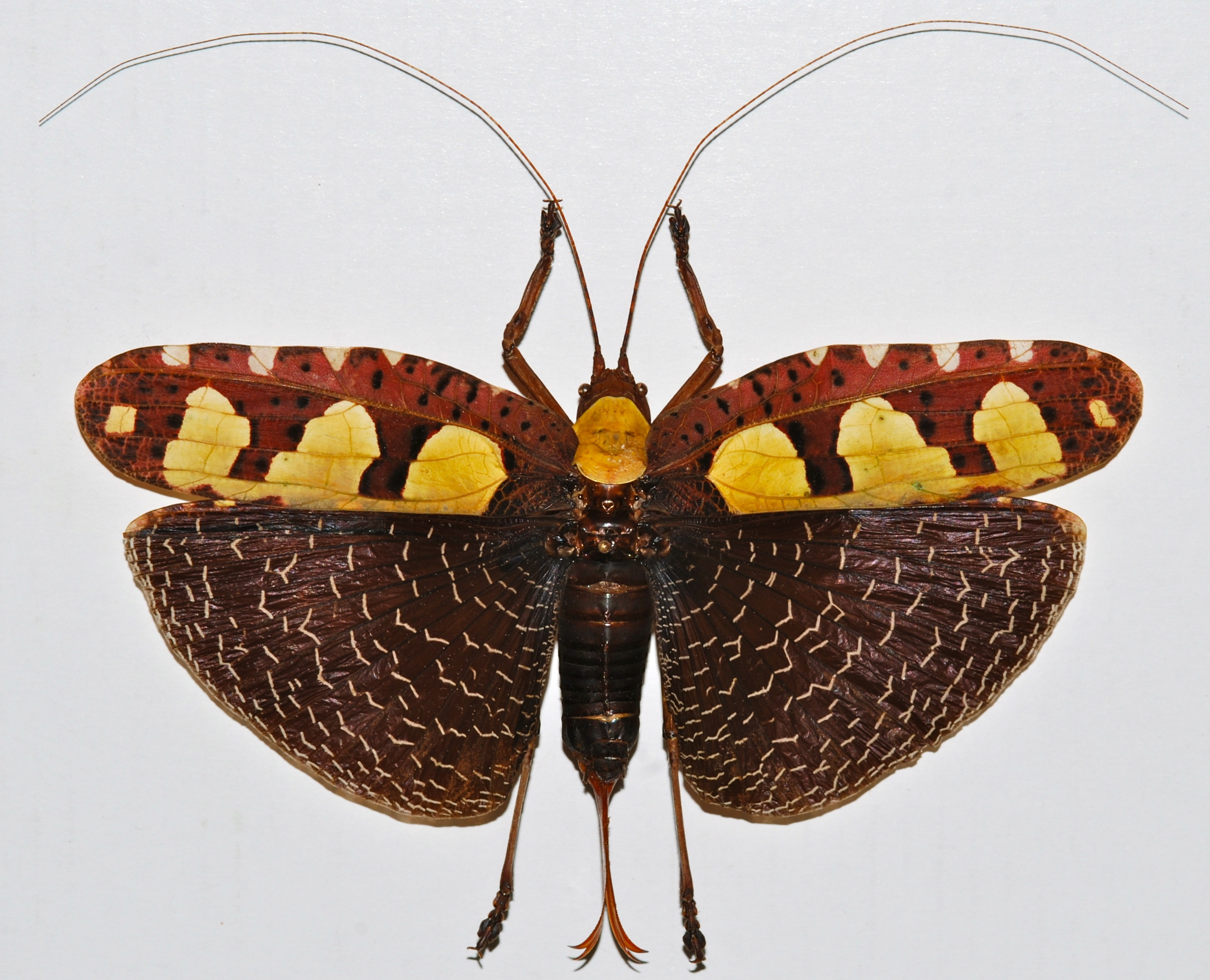
Sanaa regalis

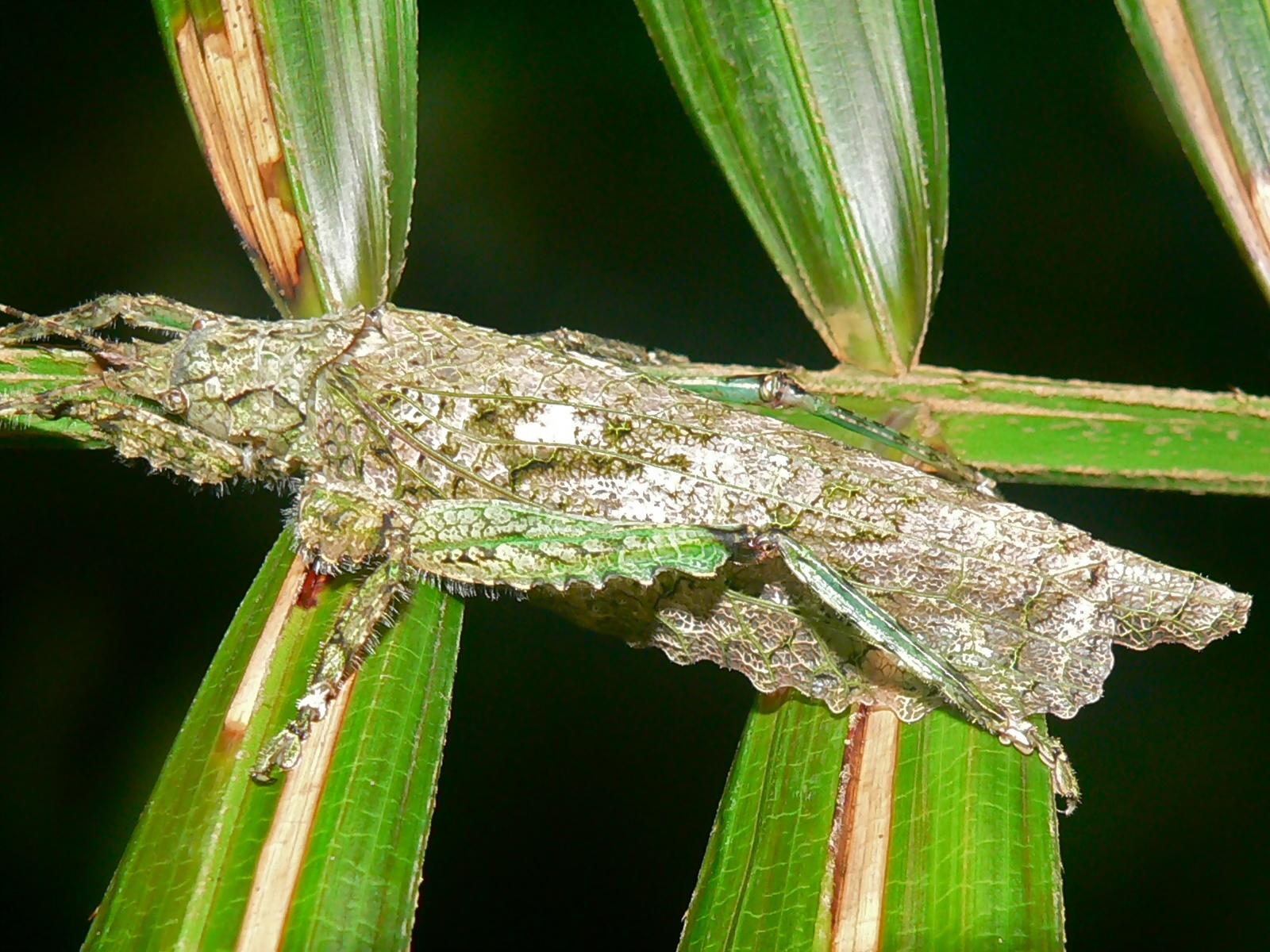
Tegra novaehollandiae

- Cymatomera Schaum, 1853 (Africa)
- Cymatomerella Beier, 1954 (Africa)
- Olcinia Stål, 1877
- Parasanaa Beier, 1944
- Platenia Dohrn, 1888 - monotypic Platenia semialata (Philippines)
- Sanaa Walker, 1870
- Sathrophyllia Stål, 1874
- Sathrophylliopsis de Jong, 1939 (W. Malesia)
- Tegra Walker, 1870
- Tegrolcinia de Jong, 1939 (China, W. Malesia)
- Typhoptera Kirby, 1906

=== Eucocconotini ===
Auth.: Beier 1960 - Central and South America

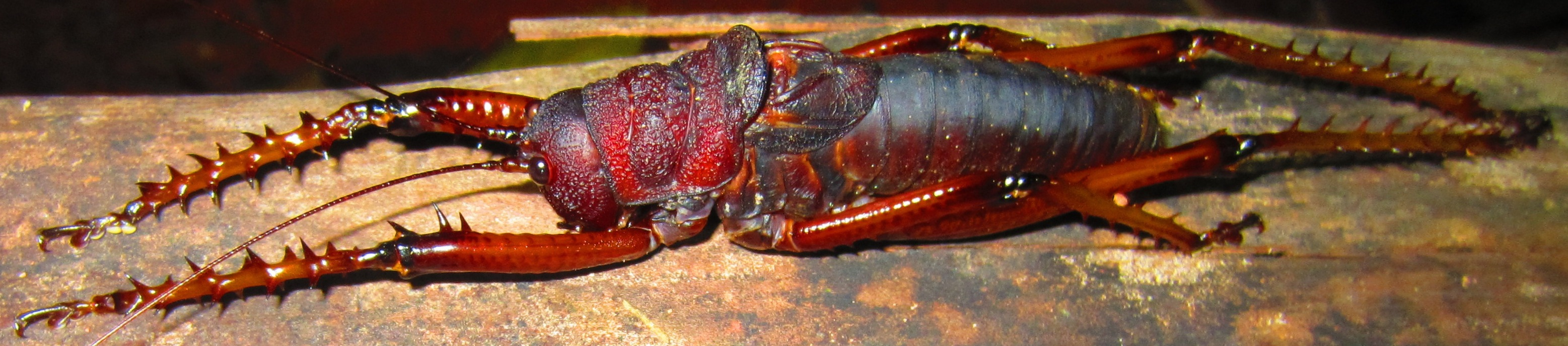
Panoploscelis specularis

- Dicranostomus Dohrn, 1888
- Eucocconotideus Beier, 1960
- Eucocconotus Hebard, 1927
- Gnathoclita Hagenbach, 1842
- Myopophyllum Beier, 1960
- Onychopygia Beier, 1962
- Panoploscelis Scudder, 1869

=== Homalaspidiini ===
Auth.: (Otte, D. 1997) - Southern America

- Arrhenotettix Caudell, 1918
- Disceratus Scudder, 1869
- Homalaspidia Uvarov, 1940
- Jimenezia Bolívar, 1881
- Sterphoter Rehn, 1946

=== Ischnomelini ===
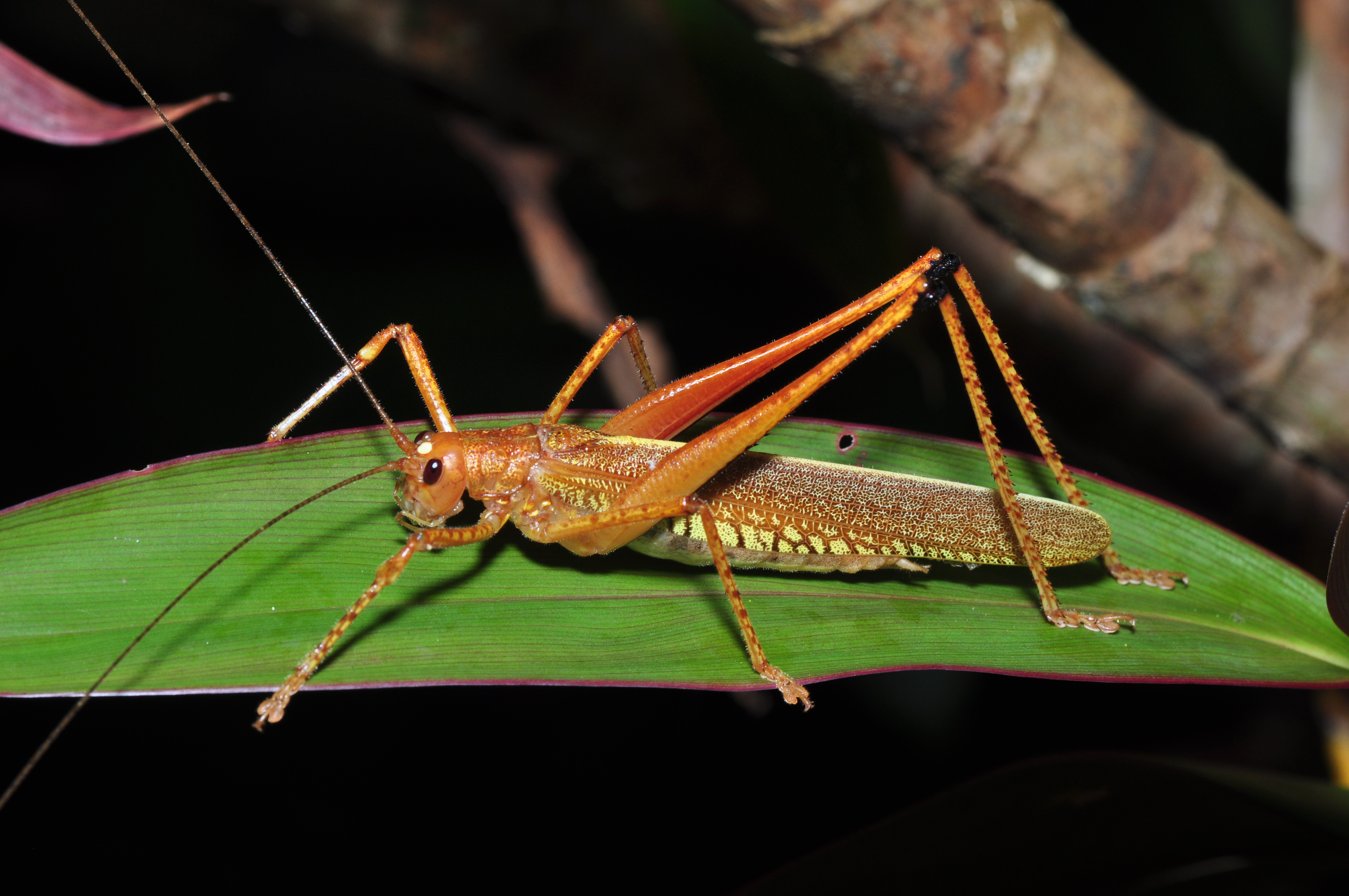
Ischnomela gracilis

Auth.: (Beier 1960) - Southern America

- Goethalsiella Hebard, 1927
- Ischnomela Stål, 1873

=== Leptotettigini ===
Auth.: (Beier 1960) - Southern America

- Chondrosternum Beier, 1960
- Leptotettix Stål, 1873
- Macrochiton Redtenbacher, 1895
- Neochiton Beier, 1962
- Pezochiton Beier, 1960
- Platychiton Beier, 1960
- Semileptotettix Brunner von Wattenwyl, 1895

=== Pantecphylini ===
Auth.: (Brunner von Wattenwyl 1895) - Central Africa

- Pantecphylus Karsch, 1890

=== Phrictini ===
Auth.: Bolívar, 1903 - sometimes placed in the Mecopodinae (Eastern Australia)

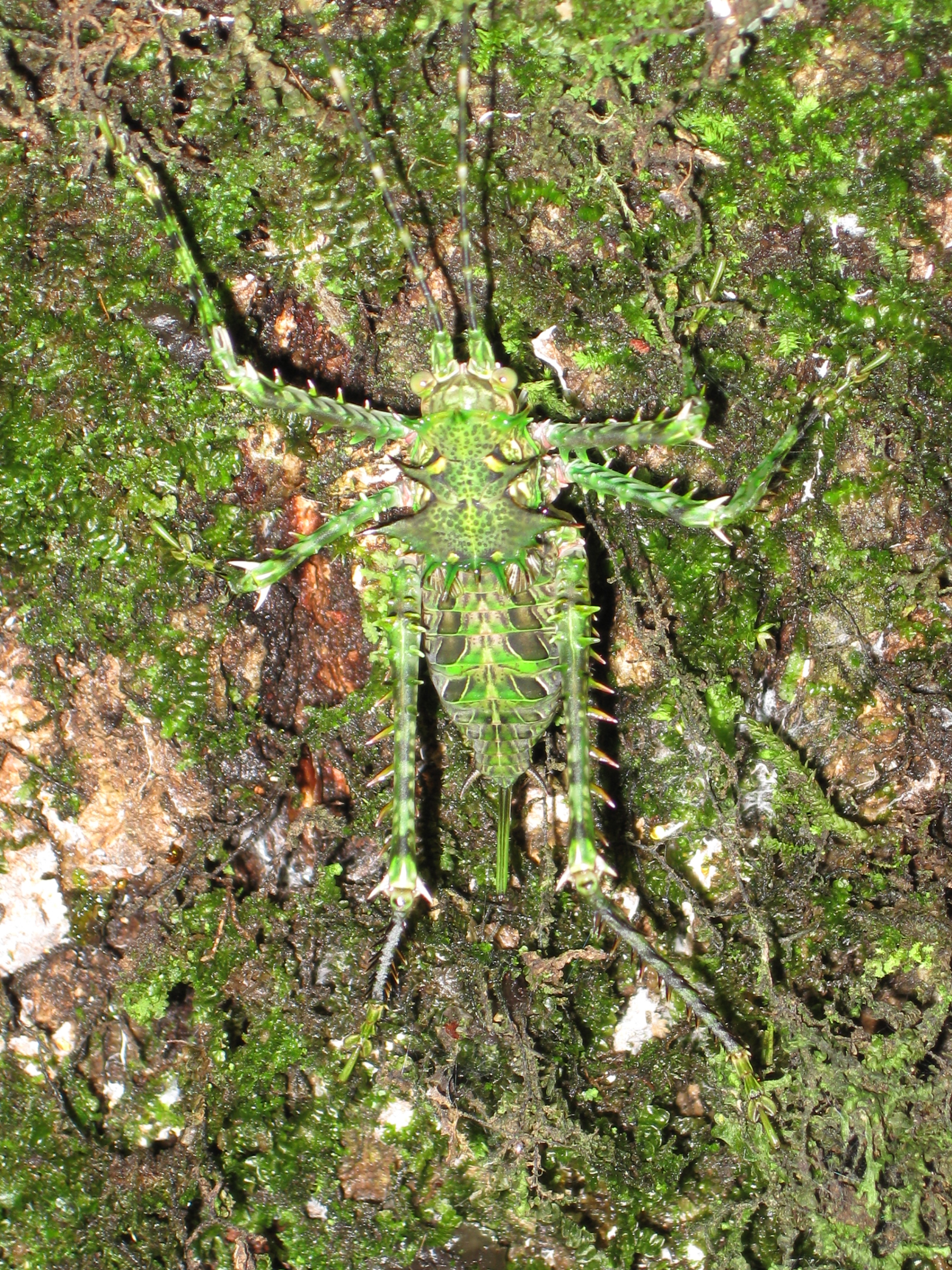
Phricta aberrans

- Phricta Redtenbacher, 1892

=== Phyllomimini ===
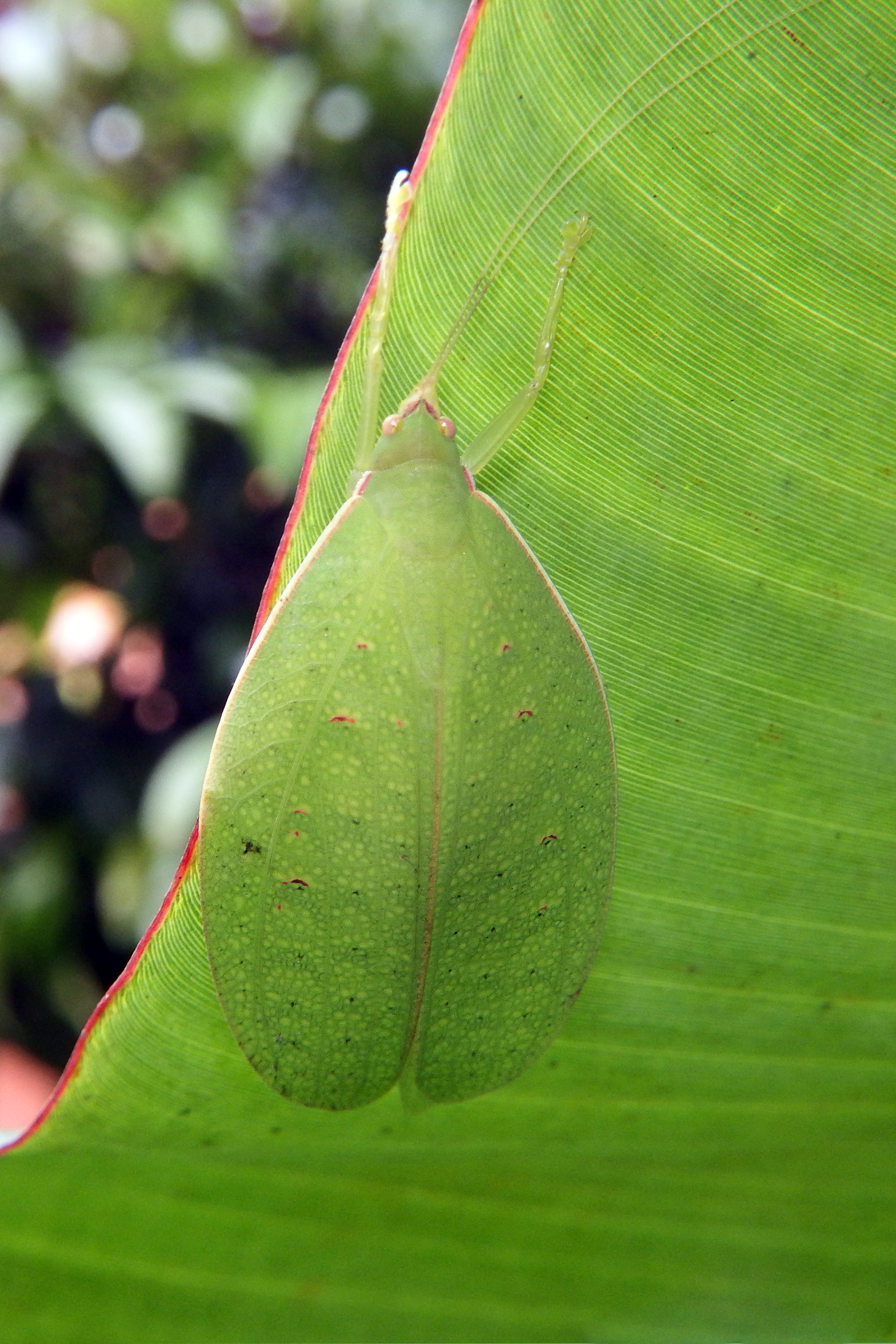
Phyllomimini

Auth.: (Brunner von Wattenwyl 1895) - West and central Africa; Australasia: India through to Pacific islands

- Acanthoprion Pictet & Saussure, 1892
- Acauloplacella Karny, 1931
- Acauloplax Karsch, 1891
- Brochopeplus Pictet & Saussure, 1892
- Brunneriana Uvarov, 1923
- Chondrodera Karsch, 1890
- Chondroderella Hebard, 1922
- Despoina Brunner von Wattenwyl, 1895
- Diplodontopus Karny, 1931
- Gonyatopus Brunner von Wattenwyl, 1895
- Hapalophyllum Hebard, 1922
- Hemigyrus Brunner von Wattenwyl, 1893
- Heteraprium Krauss, 1903
- Lacipoda Brunner von Wattenwyl, 1895
- Lagarodes Karsch, 1890
- Margarodera Beier, 1957
- Mioacris Pictet & Saussure, 1892
- Morsimus Stål, 1877
- Orophyllus Beier, 1954
- Paramorsimus Beier, 1954
- Paraphyllomimus Beier, 1954
- Phyllomimus Stål, 1873
- Phyllozelus Redtenbacher, 1892
- Pirmeda Henry, 1940
- Promeca Brunner von Wattenwyl, 1895
- Pseudacanthoprion Beier, 1954
- Pseudophyllomimus Karny, 1924
- Rhinodera Beier, 1955
- Stenampyx Karsch, 1890
- Stizoscepa Karsch, 1896
- Temnophylloides Henry, 1939
- Temnophyllus Redtenbacher, 1895
- Timanthes Stål, 1877
- Tomias Karsch, 1890
- Tympanophyllum Krauss, 1903
- Tympanoptera Redtenbacher, 1892
- Zumala Walker, 1869

=== Platyphyllini ===
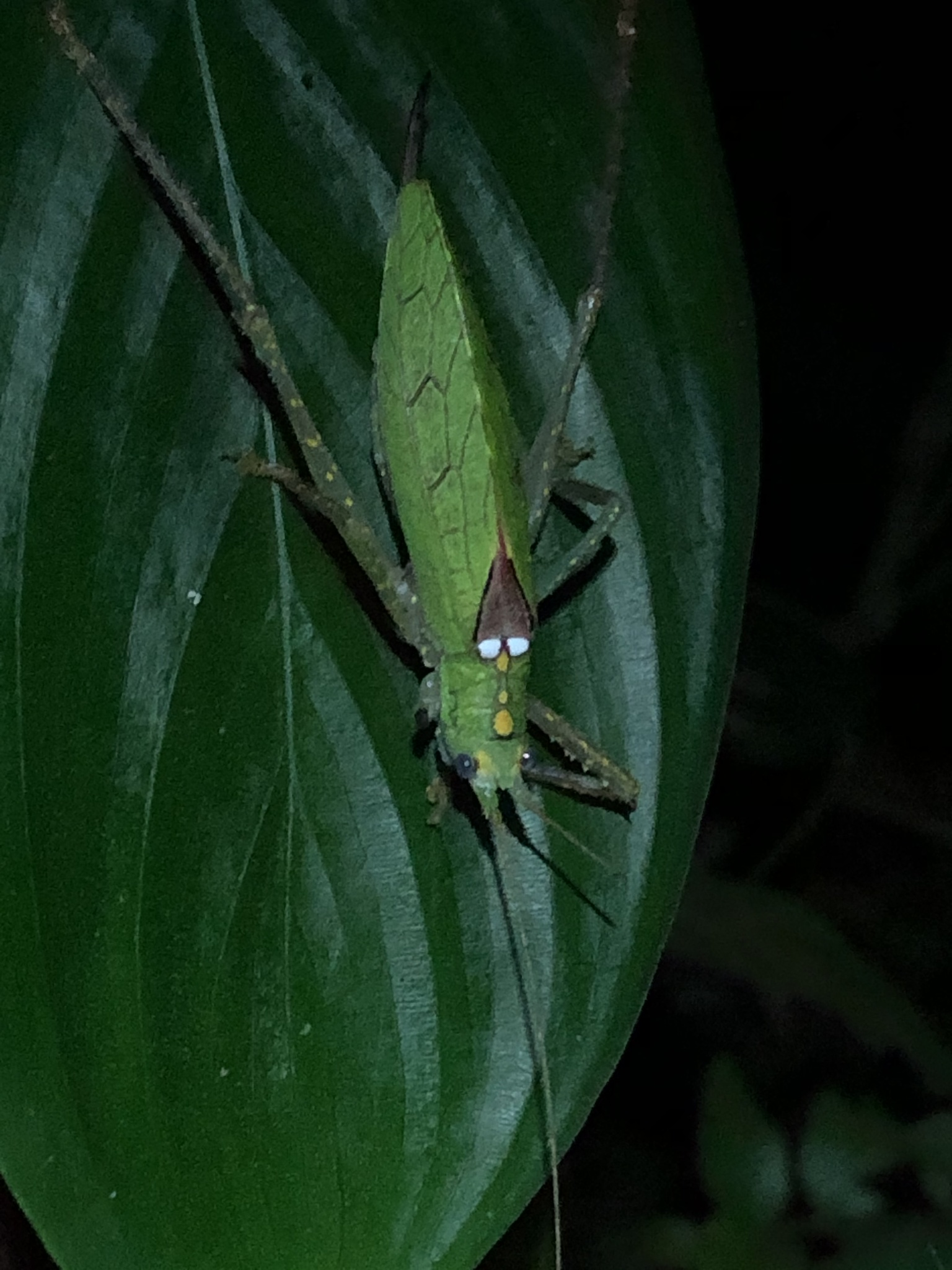
Xiphophyllum sp.

Auth.: (Brunner von Wattenwyl 1895) - Southern America

- Acyrophyllum Beier, 1960
- Aemasia Brunner von Wattenwyl, 1895
- Antillophyllum Beier, 1960
- Baliophyllum Beier, 1962
- Brachyauchenus Brunner von Wattenwyl, 1895
- Choeroparnops Dohrn, 1888
- Diyllus Stål, 1875
- Drepanoxiphus Brunner von Wattenwyl, 1895
- Haenschiella Beier, 1960
- Kopis Beier, 1960
- Myrmeciophyllum Beier, 1960
- Opetiocercus Beier, 1960
- Platyphyllum Serville, 1831
- Rhabdotophyllum Beier, 1960
- Triencentrus Brunner von Wattenwyl, 1895
- Xiphophyllum Beier, 1960

=== Pleminiini ===
Auth.: (Brunner von Wattenwyl 1895) - Central and southern America, West and central Africa

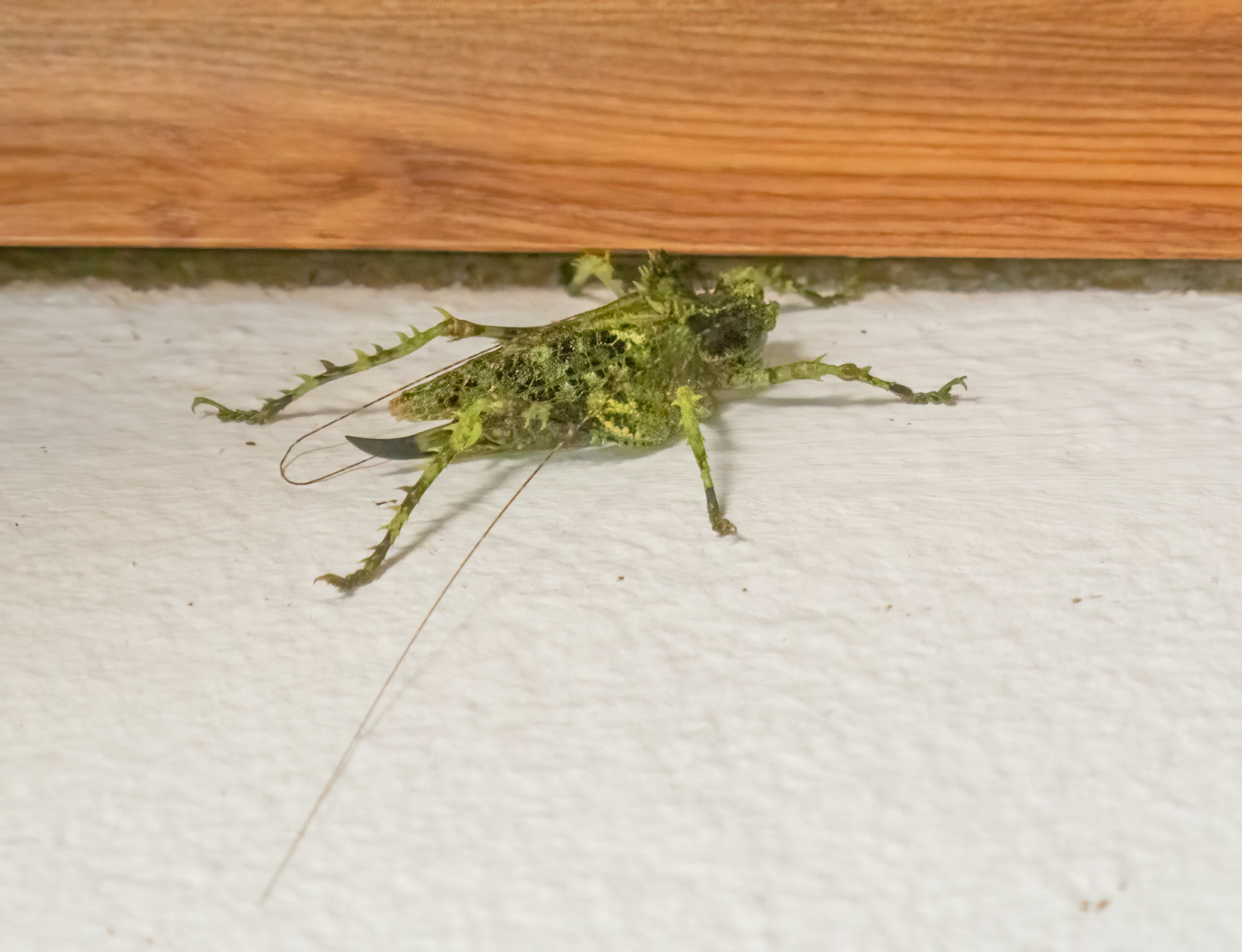
Championica cristulata in Costa Rica

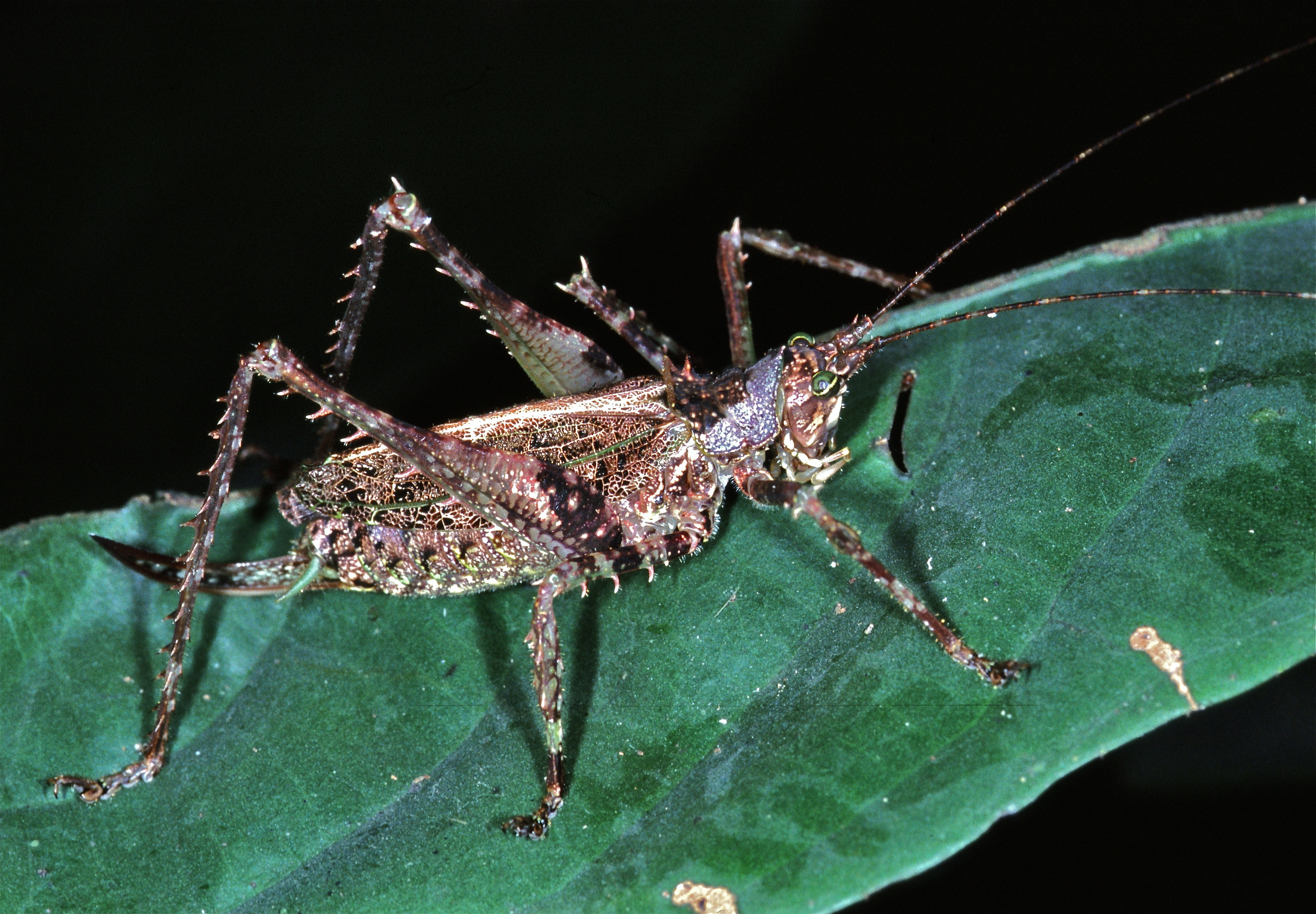
Batodromeus subulo

- Acanthodis Serville, 1831
- Acanthorhinischia Beier, 1954
- Adapantus Karsch, 1891
- Adeclus Brunner von Wattenwyl, 1895
- Adenes Karsch, 1891
- Amiltonia Piza, 1976
- Ancistrocercus Beier, 1954
- Anonistus Walker, 1871
- Apereisis Walker, 1871
- Aspidopygia Beier, 1962
- Balboana Uvarov, 1939
- Batodromeus Karsch, 1896
- Beieroschema Özdikmen, 2008 (formerly Colobotettix Beier, 1960 (non Ribaut, 1948: preoccupied))
- Bufotettix Caudell, 1918
- Championica Saussure & Pictet, 1898
- Clepsydronotus Beier, 1954
- Condylocnemis Redtenbacher, 1895
- Corynecercus Beier, 1954
- Dasyscelidius Beier, 1954
- Dasyscelus Redtenbacher, 1895
- Diacanthodis Walker, 1870
- Enthacanthodes Redtenbacher, 1895
- Gongrocnemis Redtenbacher, 1895
- Habrocomes Karsch, 1890
- Haemodiasma Brunner von Wattenwyl, 1895
- Hoplidostylus Karsch, 1893
- Jamaicana Brunner von Wattenwyl, 1895
- Labidocercus Beier, 1954
- Leurophyllidium Beier, 1954
- Leurophyllum Kirby, 1906
- Lichenochrus Karsch, 1890
- Mormotus Karsch, 1890
- Nesokatoikos Braun & Maehr, 2008 (formerly Nesocnemis Beier, 1954 (non Sélys, 1891: preoccupied))
- Nesophyllidium Beier, 1954
- Orpacanthophora Beier, 1954
- Paradeclus Beier, 1954
- Paralichenochrus Beier, 1954
- Parapleminia Beier, 1954
- Pedinothorax Beier, 1954
- Phyllostachydius Beier, 1954
- Pleminia Stål, 1874
- Polyglochin Karsch, 1890
- Pristonotus Uvarov, 1940
- Pseudopleminia Beier, 1954
- Rhinischia Beier, 1954
- Schochia Brunner von Wattenwyl, 1895
- Sphyrophyllum Beier, 1954
- Stenoschema Redtenbacher, 1895
- Tetragonomera Stål, 1874
- Tympanocompus Karsch, 1891
- Xerophyllopteryx Rehn, 1905

=== Polyancistrini ===
Auth.: (Brunner von Wattenwyl 1895) - Mexico, Caribbean, Southern America

- Camposiella Hebard, 1924
- Polyancistroides Rehn, 1901
- Polyancistrus Serville, 1831
- Sagephorus Redtenbacher, 1895
- Spelaeala Rehn, 1943
- Spinapecta Naskrecki & Lopes-Andrade, 2005

=== Pseudophyllini ===
Auth.: (Burmeister 1838) - West and central Africa; Asia: India, Indo-China through to Papua New Guinea

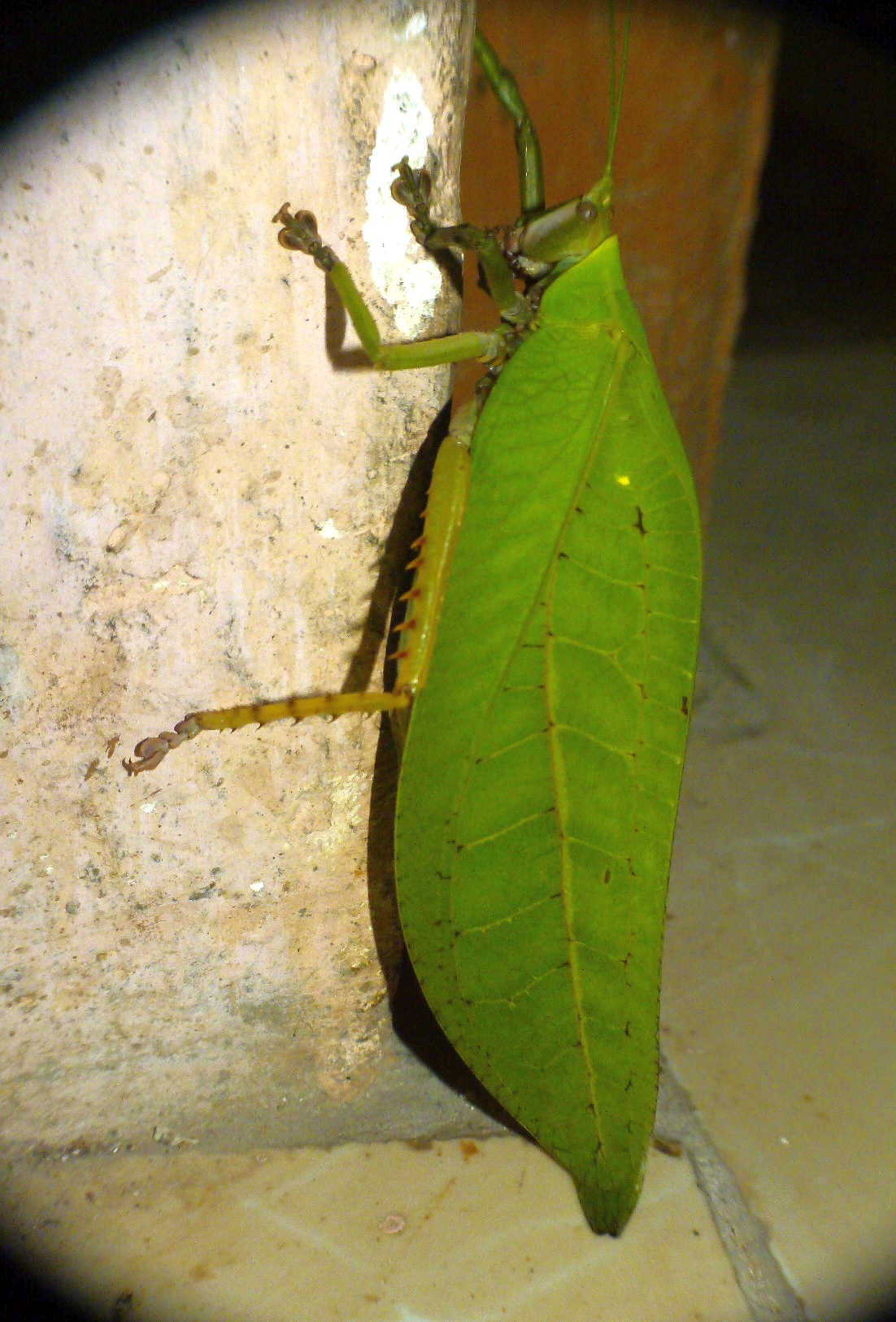
Onomarchus kanara

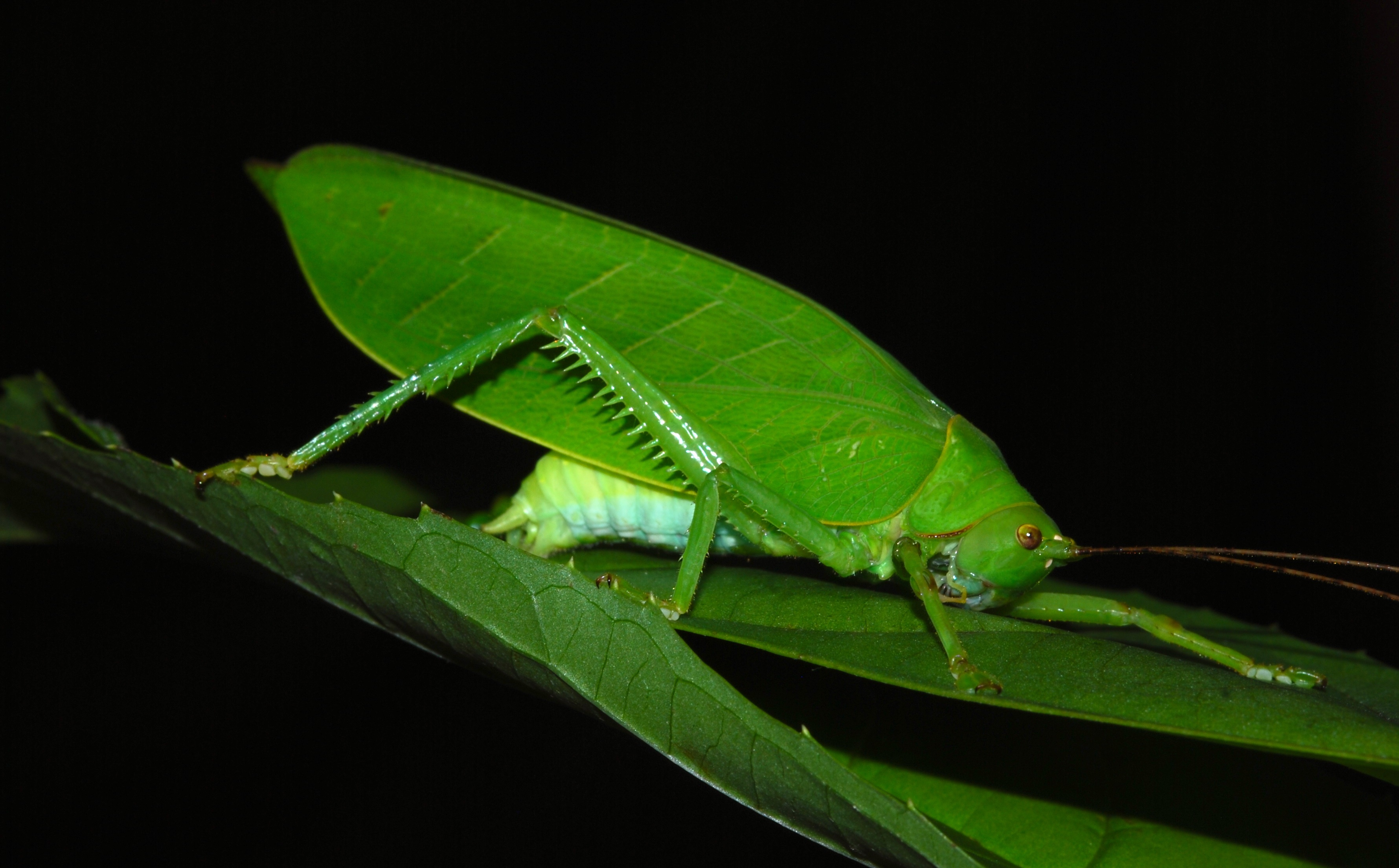
Rhomboptera semilunata

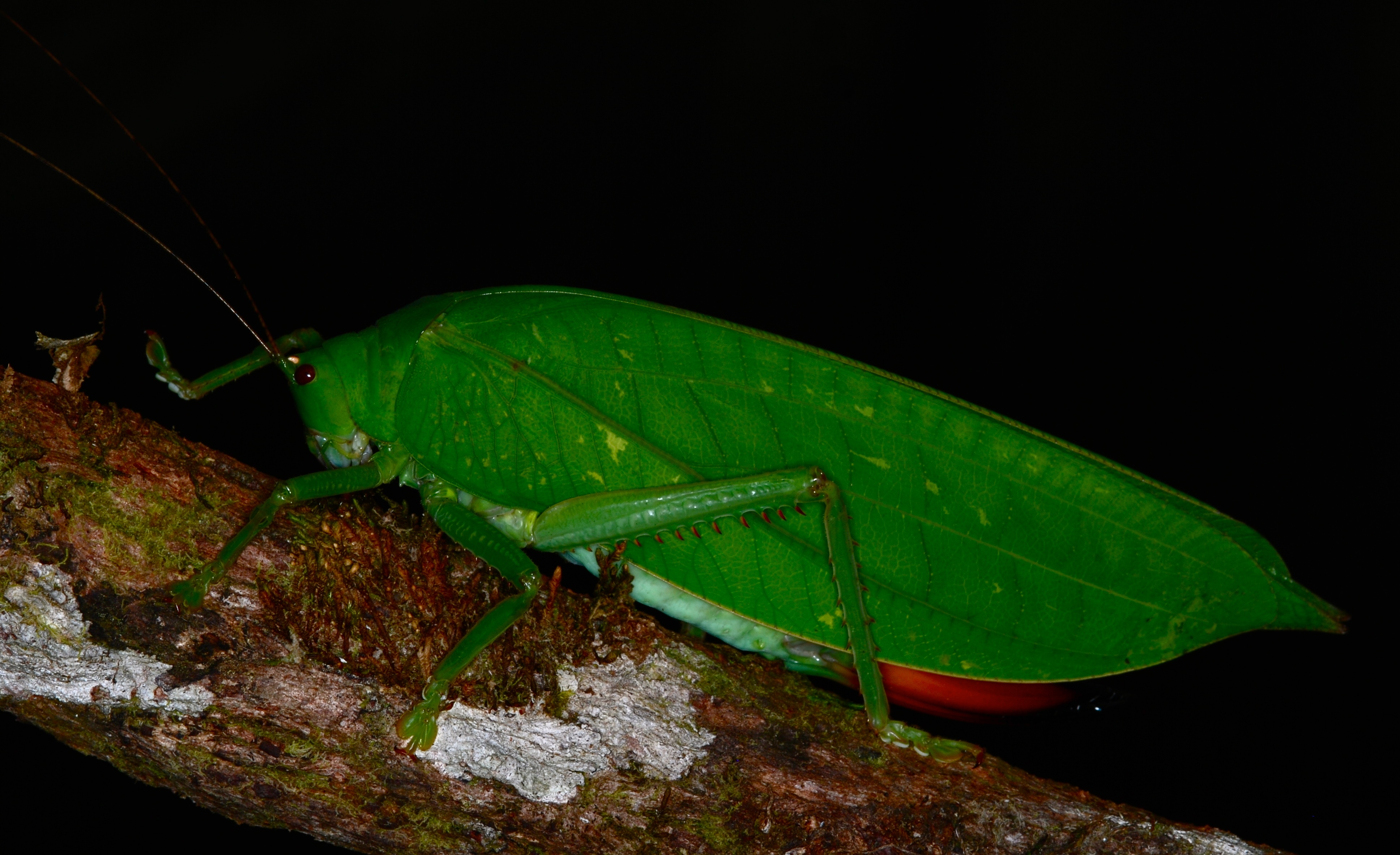
Cratioma sp.

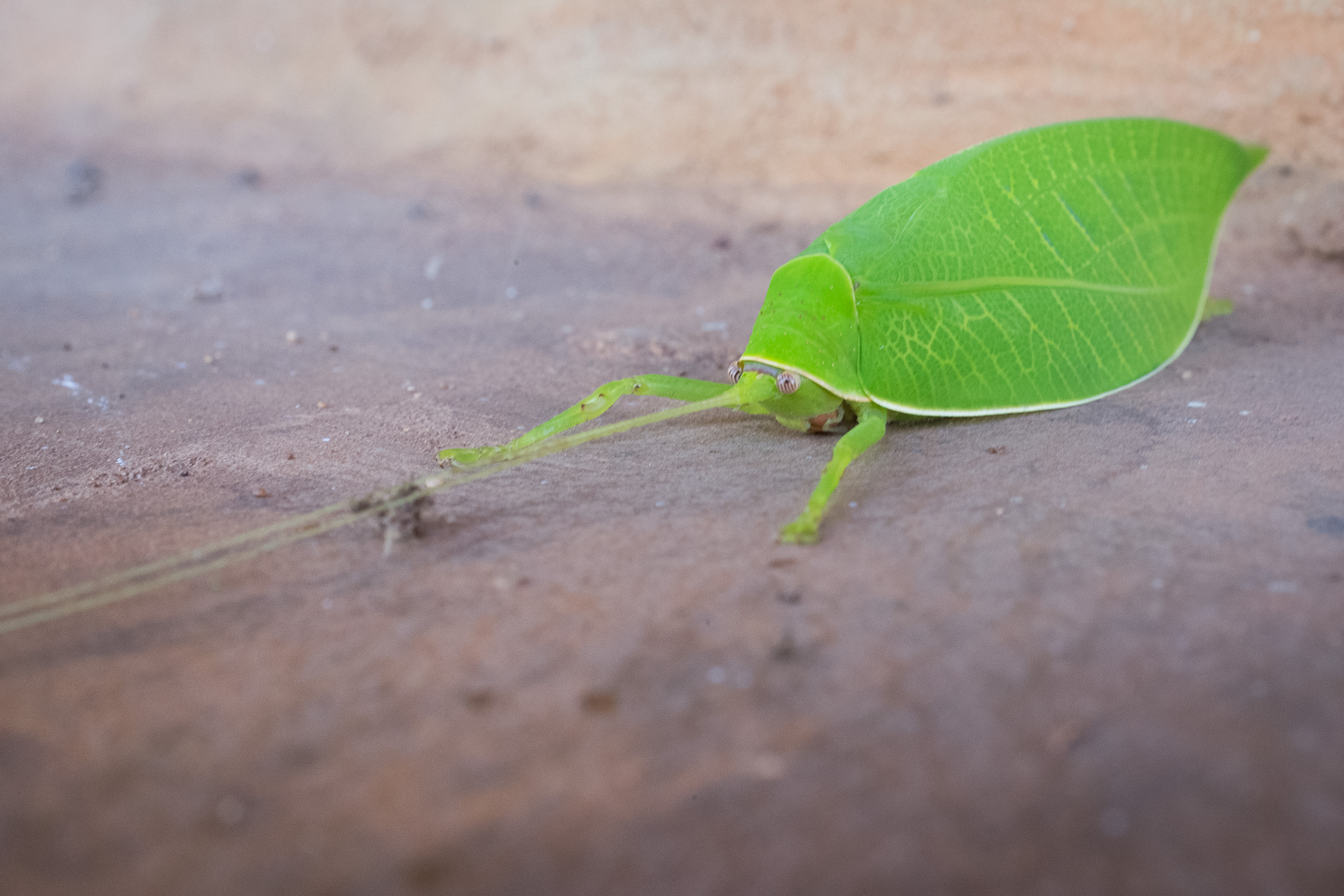
Zabalius cf. ophthalmicus

- Brunneana Uvarov, 1939
- Chloracris Pictet & Saussure, 1892
- Climacoptera Redtenbacher, 1895
- Cratioma Bolívar, 1906
- Desaulcya Bolívar, 1906
- Liocentrum Karsch, 1890
- Micta Karsch, 1896
- Mustius Stål, 1874
- Onomarchus Stål, 1874
- Opisthodicrus Karsch, 1890
- Oxyaspis Brunner von Wattenwyl, 1895
- Perteus Bolívar, 1906
- Pseudophyllus Serville, 1831
  - Pseudophyllus titan
- Rhomboptera Redtenbacher, 1895
- Zabalius Bolívar, 1886
  - Zabalius apicalis

=== Pterophyllini ===
Auth.: (Karny, 1925) – Americas

- Caloxiphus Saussure & Pictet, 1898
- Caribophyllum Rehn, 1947
- Diophanes Stål, 1875
- Elytraspis Beier, 1962
- Karukerana Bonfils, 1965
- Lea Caudell, 1906
- Lophaspis Redtenbacher, 1895
- Mastophyllum Beier, 1960
- Paracyrtophyllus Caudell, 1906
- Parascopioricus Beier, 1960
- Phyllopectis Rehn, 1948
- Pterophylla Kirby, 1825
- Scopioricus Uvarov, 1940
- Scopiorinus Beier, 1960
- Thliboscelus Serville, 1838
- Xestoptera Redtenbacher, 1895

=== Simoderini ===
Auth.: (Brunner von Wattenwyl, 1895) - Madagascar, Australia

- Chloracantha Hebard, 1922
- Lonchitophyllum Brunner von Wattenwyl, 1895
- Mastigaphoides Weidner, 1965
- Mastighapha Karsch, 1891
- Parasimodera Carl, 1914
- Phyrama Karsch, 1889
- Simodera Karsch, 1891
- Wattenwyliella Carl, 1914

=== Teleutiini ===
Auth.: (Beier, 1960) - Panama to Southern America

- Acanthodiphrus Walker, 1871
- Apteroteleutias Beier, 1962
- Beierella Piza, 1978
- Brachyteleutias Beier, 1960
- Chibchella Hebard, 1927
- Eumecopterus Beier, 1960
- Hoplotettix Caudell, 1918
- Leptoteleutias Beier, 1962
- Mylothrella Beier, 1960
- Pemba Walker, 1870
- Stetharasa Montealegre-Z. & Morris, 1999
- Teleutias Stål, 1874

=== Tribe undetermined ===
- Narea Walker, 1870 - Australia
- †Archepseudophylla Nel, Prokop & Ross, 2008

Due to the great diversity of this subfamily, it is not unequivocally delimited yet.
