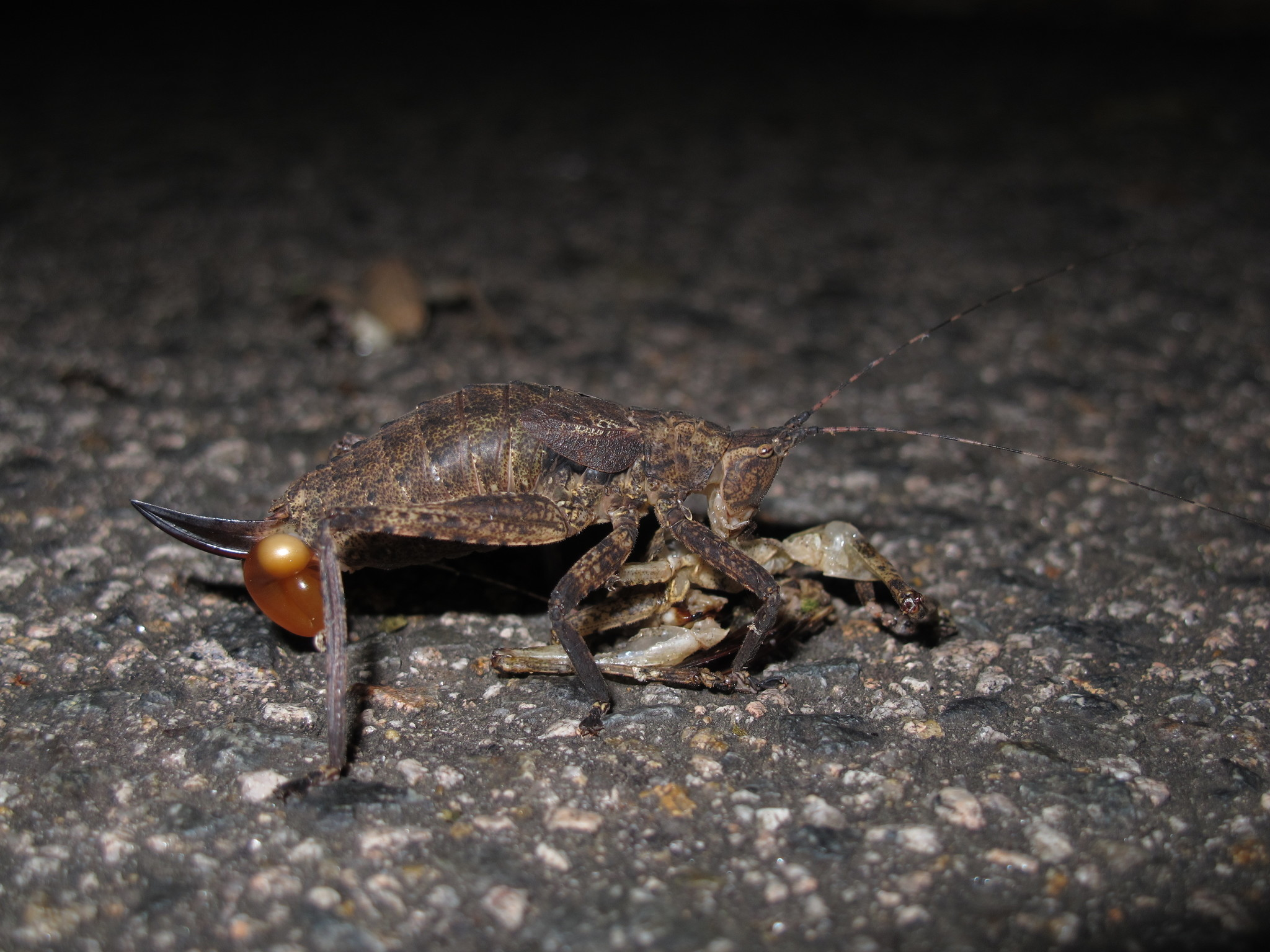
- Callimenellus fumidus in Hong Kong

Scientific classification
- Kingdom: Animalia
- Phylum: Arthropoda
- Class: Insecta
- Order: Orthoptera
- Suborder: Ensifera
- Family: Tettigoniidae
- Subfamily: Pseudophyllinae
- Tribe: Callimenellini; Gorochov, 1990
- Genus: Callimenellus; Walker, 1871

Synonyms
- Phanerotus Brunner von Wattenwyl, 1893

= Callimenellus =

Genus of cricket-like animals

Callimenellus is an Asian genus of bush crickets in the subfamily Pseudophyllinae. It is the sole genus in the tribe Callimenellini.

Species are distributed in: India, China, Indo-China and the Philippines.

== Species ==
The Catalogue of Life lists:

1. Callimenellus albolineatus Gorochov & Voltshenkova, 2005
2. Callimenellus albomaculatus Gorochov & Voltshenkova, 2005
3. Callimenellus apterus Beier, 1944
4. Callimenellus beybienkoi Gorochov & Voltshenkova, 2005
5. Callimenellus changi Gorochov & Voltshenkova, 2005
6. Callimenellus distinctus Gorochov & Voltshenkova, 2005
7. Callimenellus ferrugineus Brunner von Wattenwyl, 1895
8. Callimenellus fumidus Walker, 1871
  - type species (China, Vietnam)
9. Callimenellus maculatus Gorochov & Voltshenkova, 2005
10. Callimenellus modestus Gorochov & Voltshenkova, 2005
11. Callimenellus opacus Brunner von Wattenwyl, 1893
12. Callimenellus variegatus Gorochov & Voltshenkova, 2005
