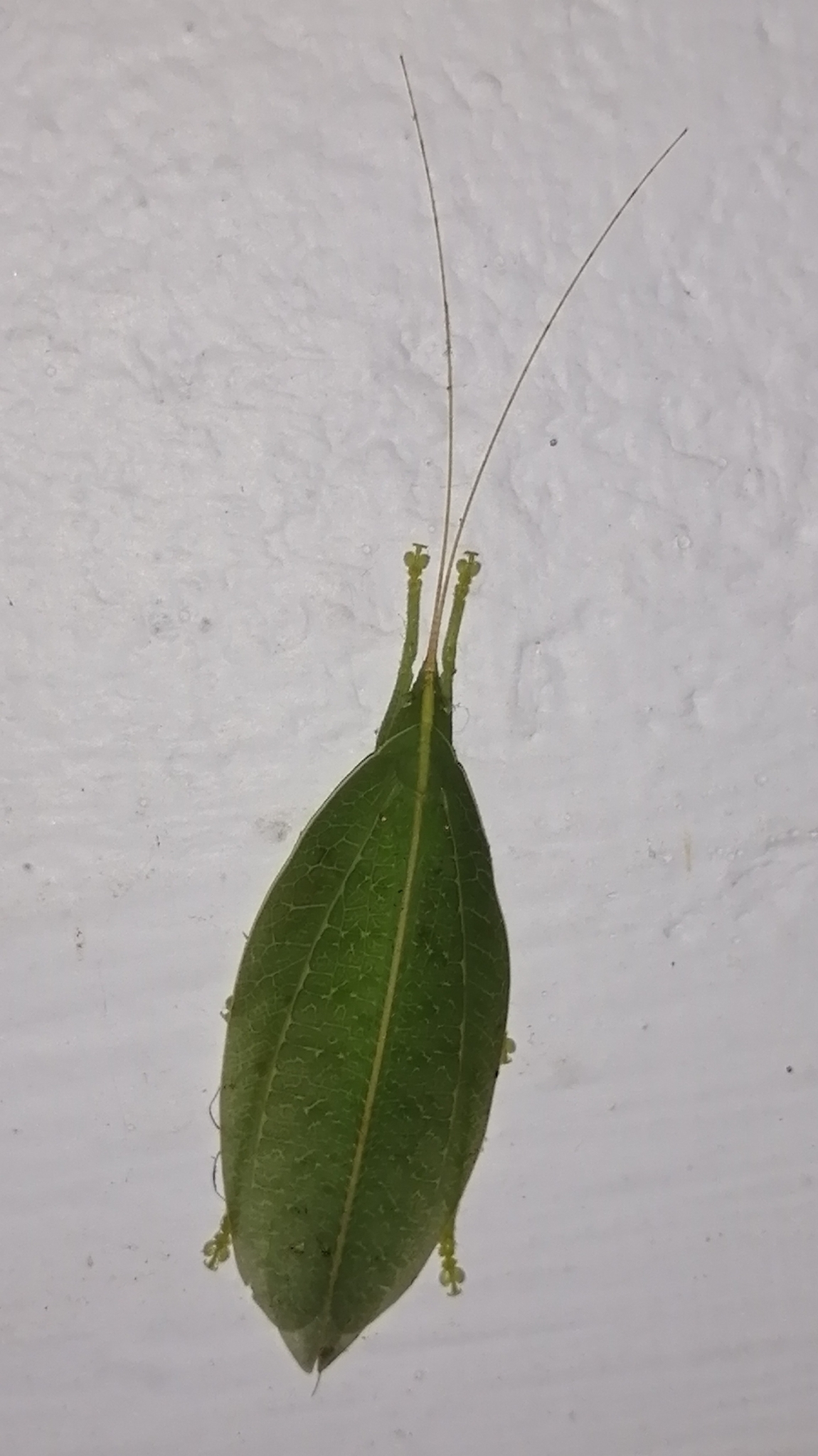
- Paramorsimus oleifolius

Scientific classification
- Kingdom: Animalia
- Phylum: Arthropoda
- Clade: Pancrustacea
- Class: Insecta
- Order: Orthoptera
- Suborder: Ensifera
- Family: Tettigoniidae
- Subfamily: Pseudophyllinae
- Tribe: Phyllomimini
- Genus: Paramorsimus; Beier, 1954

= Paramorsimus =

Genus of cricket-like animals

Paramorsimus is a genus of bush-crickets in the subfamily Pseudophyllinae and tribe Phyllomimini. Species have been recorded (probably incompletely) from India, Vietnam and Malesia.

== Species ==
The Orthoptera Species File lists:

1. Paramorsimus acutelaminatus Brunner von Wattenwyl, 1895
2. Paramorsimus confinis Brunner von Wattenwyl, 1895
3. Paramorsimus fruhstorferi Beier, 1954
4. Paramorsimus karsuaensis Farooqi & Amir, 2025
5. Paramorsimus maculifolius Pictet & Saussure, 1892
6. Paramorsimus obliquevenosus Brunner von Wattenwyl, 1895
7. Paramorsimus oleifolius (Fabricius, 1793)
  type species (as Locusta oleifolia Fabricius)
8. Paramorsimus robustus Brunner von Wattenwyl, 1895
