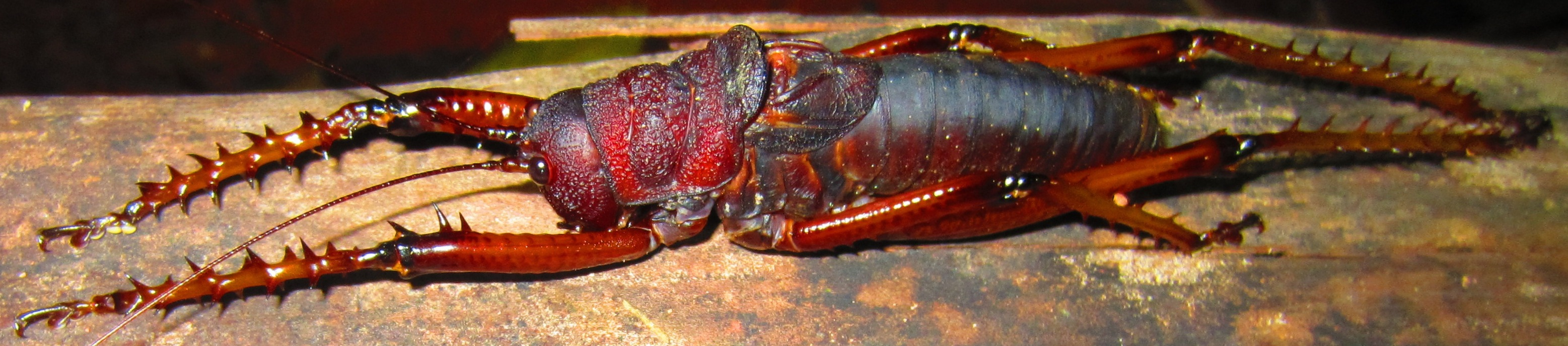
- Male P. specularis specimen observed near the Cuyabeno River in Sucumbíos Province, Ecuador

Scientific classification
- Kingdom: Animalia
- Phylum: Arthropoda
- Clade: Pancrustacea
- Class: Insecta
- Order: Orthoptera
- Suborder: Ensifera
- Family: Tettigoniidae
- Subfamily: Pseudophyllinae
- Tribe: Eucocconotini
- Genus: Panoploscelis; Scudder, 1869

Species
- 4, see text.

Synonyms
- Panoploscelus Charles Leonard Hogue, 1993

= Panoploscelis =

Genus of cricket-like animals

Panoploscelis (commonly referred to as spiny lobster katydids or giant lobster crickets) is a genus of very large insects belonging to the true katydid tribe Eucocconotini, which is a subfamily of the Tettigoniidae. Like the other members of the suborder Ensifera, Panoploscelis are part of the insect order Orthoptera, which also contains crickets, grasshoppers and locusts. Members of this genus are among the largest katydids of the Neotropics.

These terrestrial, predatory insects are endemic to the remote and relatively inaccessible neotropical rainforests of Central and South America. Little is known about this genus, because data thus far have been collected from a very limited number of specimens. The first specimen, a female of the species P. armata, was described in 1869 by Samuel Hubbard Scudder. The male of the species P. specularis was described for the first time in 2003.

== Taxonomy ==
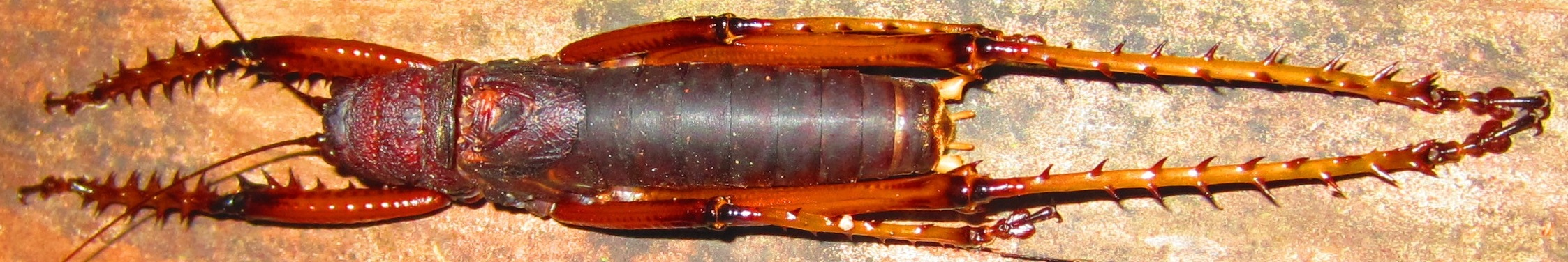
Male P. specularis, Cuyabeno River, Sucumbíos Province, Ecuador. Note the anteriorly directed distal spine on both fore femurs, tubercles located at the base of each of the antennae, and the lack of spines on the dorsal surfaces of the femora.

The subfamily Pseudophyllinae was first described by Hermann Burmeister in 1838. The tribe Eucocconotini was first described by Max Beier in 1960. There are currently four recognized species of Panoploscelis:

- P. angusticauda (Beier, 1950)
- P. armata (Scudder, 1869)
- P. scudderi (Beier, 1950)
- P. specularis (Beier, 1950)

== Distribution ==
All species of Panoploscelis are endemic to the neotropical rainforests of Colombia, Ecuador, Peru, Brazil, and Guyana, especially in the higher drainage of the Amazon River.

== Morphology ==
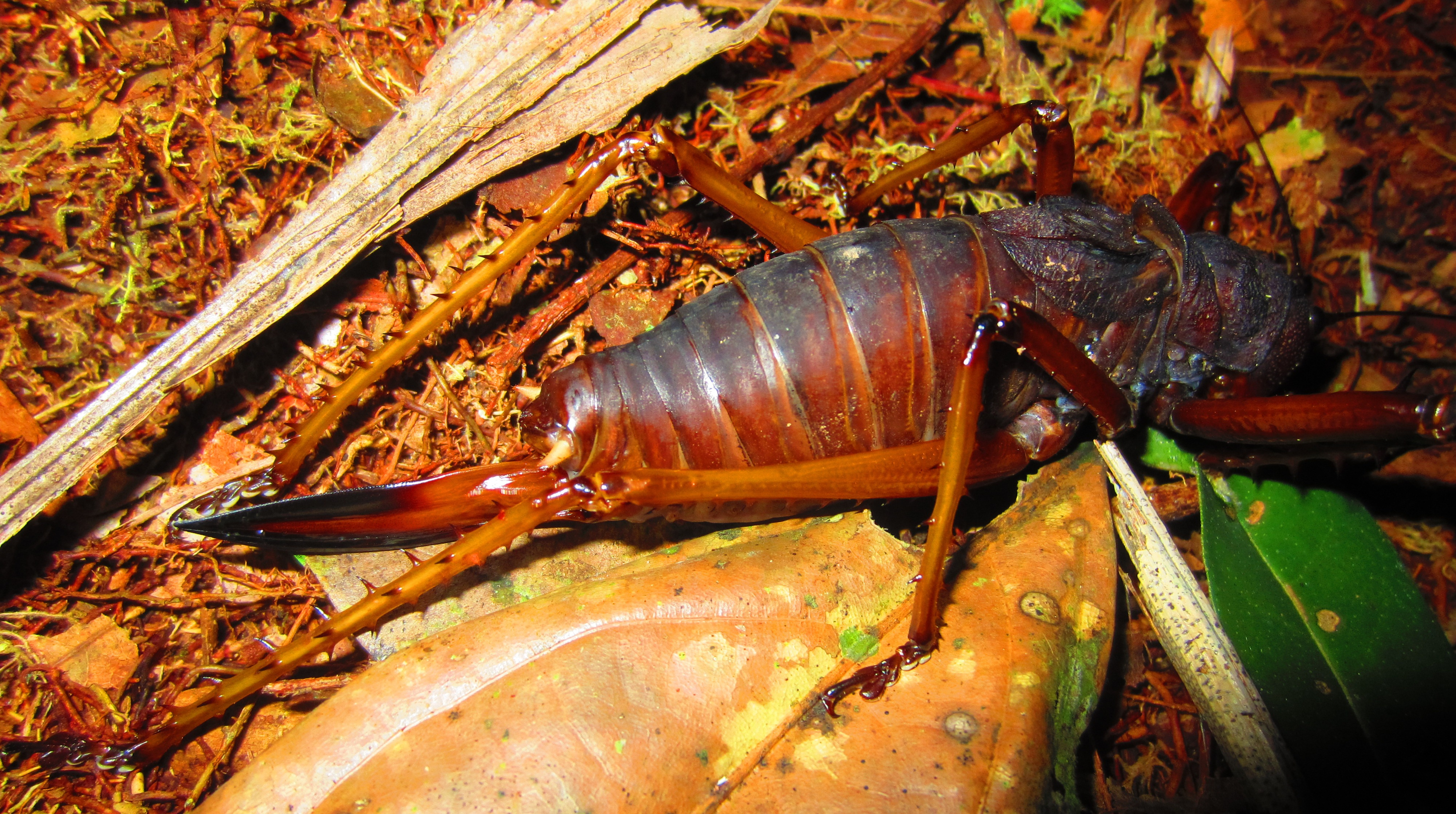
Female P. specularis, Cuyabeno River, Sucumbíos Province, Ecuador. Note the prominent, sword-shaped ovipositor.

Like many other arthropods, these insects have an exoskeleton composed largely of sclerotin. The cuticle and sclerites are reddish-brown in color, with the dorsal surfaces being more deeply pigmented than the ventral.

As with all katydids, these insects have one pair of forewings (referred to as tegmina) and one pair of hindwings. In contrast to many other katydids however, the tegmina of Panoploscelis only partly cover the hindwings. The hindwings themselves are vestigial, extending only roughly 25% the length of the abdomen. These massive brachypterous insects are therefore incapable of flight.

The tibia is longer than the femur in all three pairs of limbs; the combined length of these structures exceeds the length of the body in the case of the hindlimbs. Short cerci are present in both sexes. The antennae are filamentous and exceed the length of the body.

There is significant sexual dimorphism in the genus. The males can measure up to 60–75 millimetres (2.4–3.0 in) in length, while females are slightly longer at 69–83 millimetres (2.7–3.3 in). The subgenital plate is longer in the male than in the female. Females are easily distinguished from males by the presence of a large, sword-shaped ovipositor which measures nearly half the length of the body.

=== Tegminal sound generator ===
Detail of anterior dorsal aspect of a male P. specularis. The media anterior (MA) and the second branch of the cubital (Cu2) veins of both tegmina are clearly visible.	Detail of anterior dorsal aspect of a female P. specularis. The scraper lobe can be seen on the right side of the left tegmen. The crossveins of the right tegmen are not visible, as the left tegmen overlies the right.

Katydids produce acoustical signals by rubbing their tegmina together, a mechanism referred to as tegminal stridulation (first described by Dumortier in 1963). Male Pseudophyllinae katydids (and females of some species, such as Pterophylla camellifolia) have stridulatory apparati on their tegmina for generating such signals. This is thought to be a means for social communication such as the attraction of a mate, and also to protest when disturbed by a potential predator or other animal. The presence of sophisticated hearing organs in both males and females supports the assertion that communication by sound plays an important role in the lives of the Panoploscelis.

Both male and female Panoploscelis insects possess asymmetric tegmina upon which fully developed stridulatory organs are located. In the males of the genus Panoploscelis, the tegminal stridulatory organ consists of a file, a scraper (referred to as a plectrum), and an amplification device, as is found in other katydids. The file—consisting of a transverse vein with a single row of teeth—is located on the right wing, while the scraper consists of the sharply upturned right edge of the left wing. The thin glassy membrane of both wings, especially the larger left wing, functions as a diaphragm or drumhead to amplify the sound that is produced when the file is moved over the scraper.

In contrast to the single file of the male, females of the genus Panoploscelis, however, have anywhere from three to six such files (crossveins) on the right wing, depending on the species.

=== P. specularis ===
It is relatively easy to distinguish P. specularis from the other three species, because only in this species is the distal spine of the fore femur directed anteriorly. Also, the fastigium frontis is tubercular and obtuse in this species, where it is spiniform and acute in the other three species. Another distinguishing feature is that there is a small tubercle or nodule on the medioventral portion of the scape (the first or basal segment) of the antenna of P. specularis, in contrast to the erect distal spine in this location in the other three species. Finally, the dorsal surface of the femora are unarmed (lacking in spines) in this species, whereas the other three species possess spines at this location.

== Behavior and ecology ==
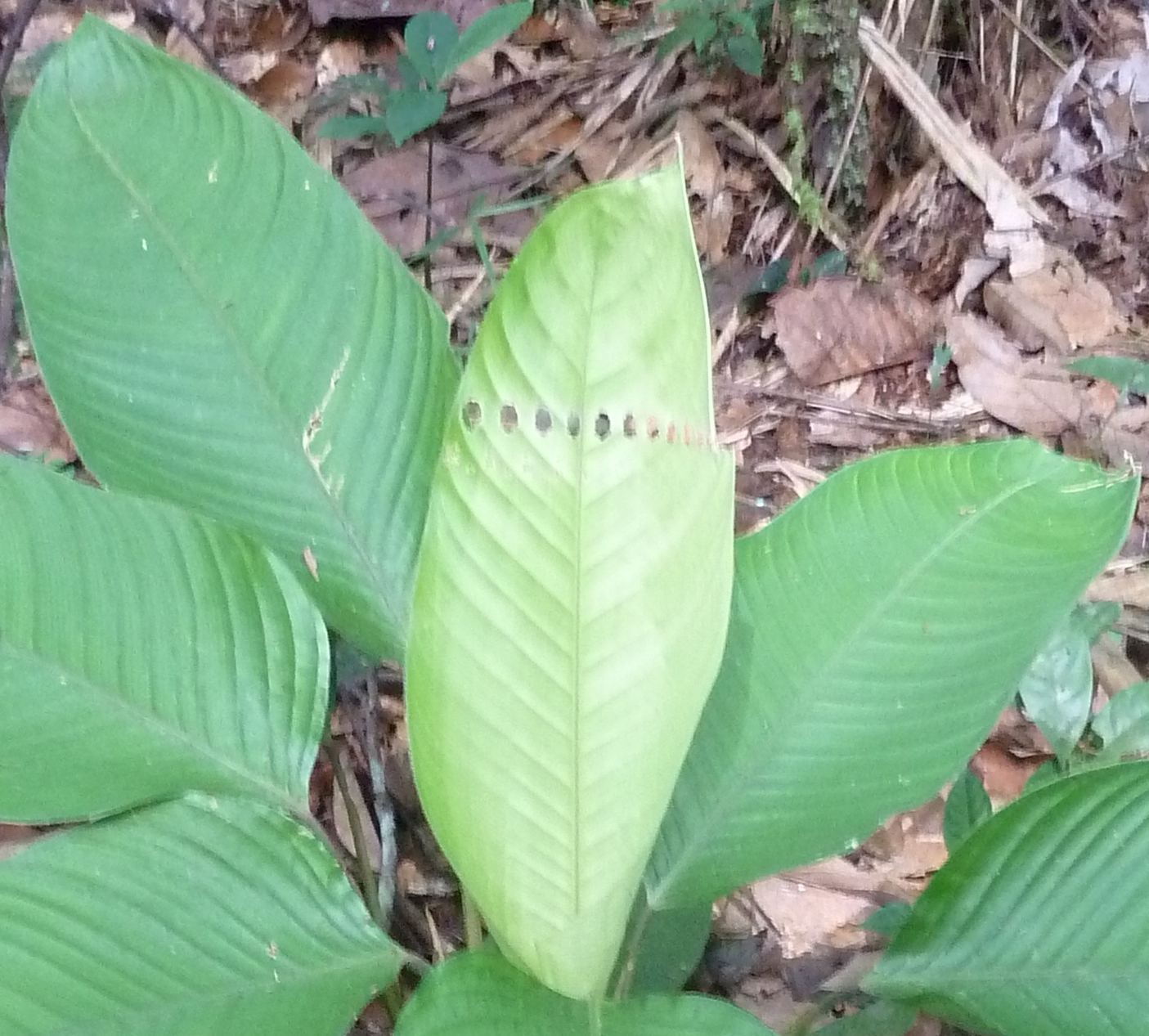
Characteristic pattern of holes left on a plant leaf that has been fed on by an insect of the genus Panoploscelis

Panoploscelis are terrestrial, predatory insects which dwell in the humid understory of the Amazon rainforest. They are nocturnally active, foraging for food at night. They are mostly herbivorous, although opportunistic carnivory has been observed; their diet includes leaves and small insects. They often leave a characteristic pattern of holes, arranged in a straight line horizontally across leaves upon which they have fed. They typically return just prior to dawn to a designated and well-concealed resting place within vegetation or leaf litter, where they remain throughout the day.

=== Defensive adaptations ===
An important source of nutrition for many vertebrates, including birds, bats, snakes, lizards and monkeys, katydids are a critical link in the food chain in their biome. Intense predatory pressure from these animals has forced these insects to evolve certain morphological and behavioral defensive defenses to avoid predation by other animals. Primary defensive adaptations are employed to avoid potential predators, while secondary adaptations are used only after the insect has been disturbed or provoked.

Primary defensive adaptations against diurnally active predators such as monkeys include the use of camouflage such as the brown color of their bodies, and concealment within vegetation or debris on the forest floor. Primary defensive adaptations against nocturnally active acoustically orienting predators such as leaf-nosed bats and other foliage-gleaners include the use of stridulatory signals characterized by a single tone at high frequency and of short duration.

Secondary defensive adaptations include acoustical alarm displays, regurgitation of material from the stomach, and the use of their powerful mandibles to inflict a painful bite. Autohaemorrhaging of hemolymph, which contains toxic phytotoxins, is another defensive strategy used by many species of katydids and possibly also the members of genus Panoploscelis. In addition to these adaptations, their massive size and the strength of their heavily armored, thorny legs offers them significant protection.

== Relationship with humans ==
They are sometimes consumed by local indigenous people such as the Siona and Secoya people of eastern Ecuador.
