= Olcinia =

Scientific classification
- Domain: Eukaryota
- Kingdom: Animalia
- Phylum: Arthropoda
- Class: Insecta
- Order: Orthoptera
- Suborder: Ensifera
- Family: Tettigoniidae
- Subfamily: Pseudophyllinae
- Supertribe: Pseudophylliti
- Tribe: Cymatomerini
- Genus: Olcinia; Stål, 1877

Species
- See text

Genus of cricket-like animals

External image
- Images at iNaturalist

Olcinia is a genus of bush crickets in the sub-family Pseudophyllinae and tribe Cymatomerini. They are found in tropical forest regions of Indo-China and Malesia.

== Description ==
Olcinia bush crickets are somewhat similar to another Asian genus Sathrophyllia but have relatively wrinkled margin to their fore-wings. They typically have cryptic colouration and likewise sit close to branches of trees and bushes, spreading their legs and antennae along the branch, close to the surface to provide camouflage.

== Species ==
The Orthoptera Species File lists the following:

- Olcinia constanti Bresseel & Vermeersch, 2017
- Olcinia crenifolia Haan, 1842
- Olcinia dentata de Jong, 1939
- Olcinia erosifolia Stål, 1877 - type species (locality Philippines)
- Olcinia excisa Karny, 1923
- Olcinia grandis de Jong, 1939
- Olcinia mahakamensis de Jong, 1939
- Olcinia nuichuana Bresseel & Vermeersch, 2017
- Olcinia pallidifrons Karny, 1926
