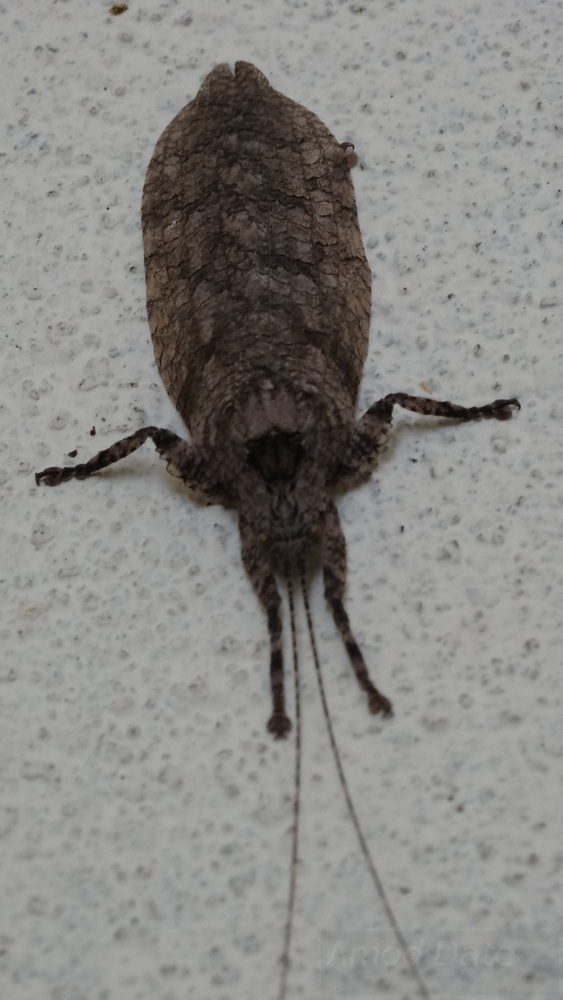

Scientific classification
- Kingdom: Animalia
- Phylum: Arthropoda
- Clade: Pancrustacea
- Class: Insecta
- Order: Orthoptera
- Suborder: Ensifera
- Family: Tettigoniidae
- Subfamily: Pseudophyllinae
- Tribe: Cymatomerini
- Genus: Sathrophyllia; Stål, 1874

Species
- See text

Synonyms
- Dehaania Koningsberger, 1902

= Sathrophyllia =

Genus of cricket-like animals

Sathrophyllia is a genus of Asian bush crickets or katydids in the subfamily Pseudophyllinae and tribe Cymatomerini. They are usually found on the branches of bushes or trees where they sit close to a branch and spread out their forelegs and antennae along the branch and hold themselves close to the surface with their middle pair of legs. Some species like S. rugosa have cryptic colouration that matches the bark making them very hard to spot. Further east, the genus Olcinia also bears a close resemblance, however Sathrophyllia has a relatively smooth margin to the forewing unlike that of Olcinia.

== Species ==
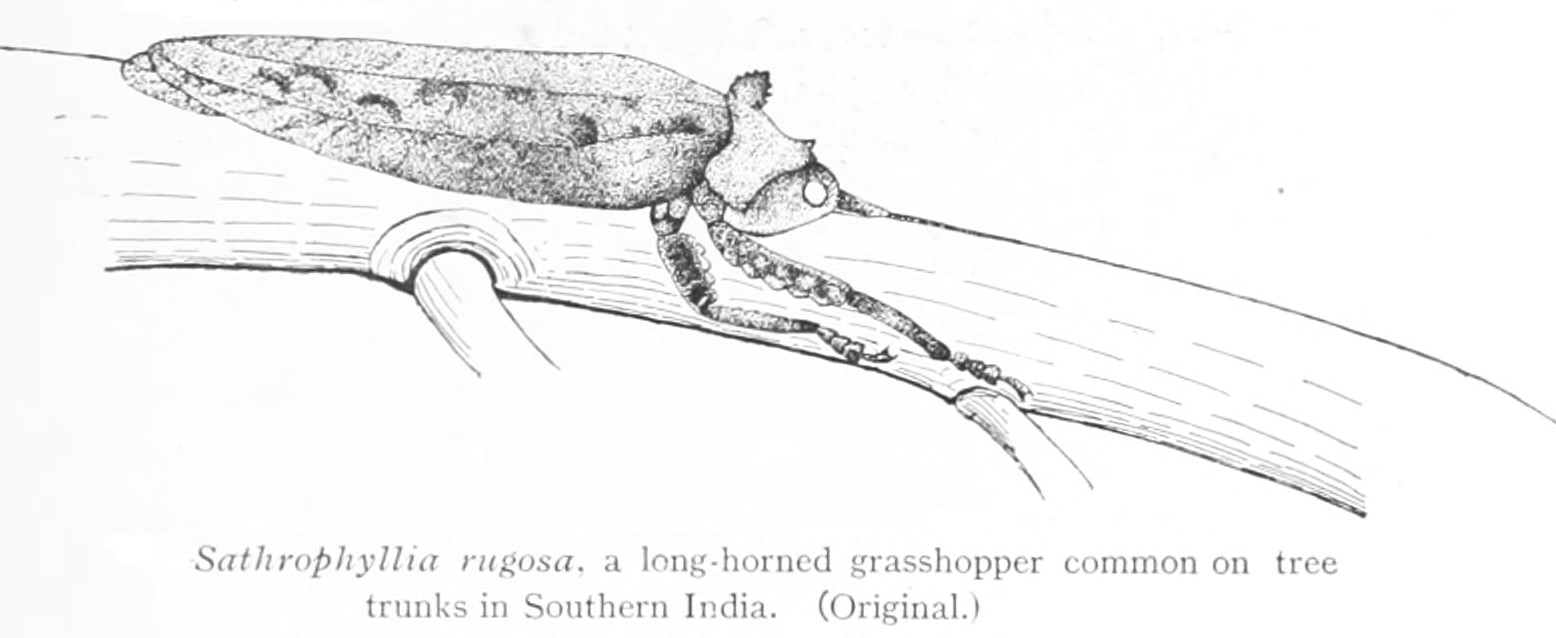
Typical posture of S. rugosa

The Orthoptera Species file lists the following:

1. Sathrophyllia arabica Krauss, 1902
2. Sathrophyllia cristata Beier, 1954
3. Sathrophyllia femorata Fabricius, 1787
4. Sathrophyllia fuliginosa Stål, 1874 - type species (locality eastern India)
5. Sathrophyllia irshadi Sultan et al., 2014
6. Sathrophyllia rugosa Linnaeus, 1758
7. Sathrophyllia saeedi Sultan et al., 2014

Note: the species irshadi and saeedi, named in 2014, did not explicitly designate holotypes, leading some authorities to claim that the names were not validly described. However, under the rules of the ICZN, specifically Article 73.1.2, a holotype is originally fixed if only a single specimen is used as the basis for a description as was the case for both of these species, and these are therefore valid names.
