= Diyllus (katydid) =

Scientific classification
- Kingdom: Animalia
- Phylum: Arthropoda
- Clade: Pancrustacea
- Class: Insecta
- Order: Orthoptera
- Suborder: Ensifera
- Family: Tettigoniidae
- Subfamily: Pseudophyllinae
- Tribe: Platyphyllini
- Genus: Diyllus; Stål, 1875

Genus of cricket-like animals

Diyllus is a small genus of katydids found in South America. Species include:

- Diyllus discophorus Stål, 1875
- Diyllus fasciatus (Brunner von Wattenwyl, 1895)
- Diyllus maximus Beier, 1960
