= Schochia =

Scientific classification
- Domain: Eukaryota
- Kingdom: Animalia
- Phylum: Arthropoda
- Class: Insecta
- Order: Orthoptera
- Suborder: Ensifera
- Family: Tettigoniidae
- Subfamily: Pseudophyllinae
- Tribe: Pleminiini
- Genus: Schochia; Brunner von Wattenwyl, 1895

Genus of cricket-like animals

Schochia Brunner von Wattenwyl, 1895, is an extant genus of South American bush-cricket (Orthoptera: Tettigoniidae) in the subfamily Pseudophyllinae.

== Species ==
- Schochia laevis Brunner von Wattenwyl, 1895
- Schochia veta Piza, 1958
- Schochia viridis Beier, 1954
