= Chloracris =

Scientific classification
- Domain: Eukaryota
- Kingdom: Animalia
- Phylum: Arthropoda
- Class: Insecta
- Order: Orthoptera
- Suborder: Ensifera
- Family: Tettigoniidae
- Subfamily: Pseudophyllinae
- Tribe: Pseudophyllini
- Genus: Chloracris; Pictet & Saussure, 1892

Type species
- Chloracris brullei Pictet & Saussure, 1892

Genus of cricket-like animals

External image
- Images at iNaturalist

Chloracris is an Asian genus of bush-crickets in the tribe Pseudophyllini and the subfamily Pseudophyllinae.

== Species ==
The Orthoptera Species File lists:

1. Chloracris borneensis de Jong, 1939 - Borneo
2. Chloracris brullei Pictet & Saussure, 1892 - Sumatra, Java
3. Chloracris brunneri Beier, 1954 - China, Vietnam, Borneo
4. Chloracris pantherina de Jong, 1939 - Sumatra
5. Chloracris prasina (Pictet & Saussure, 1892) - Indian subcontinent, Sumatra, Java

Note: A binomial authority in parentheses indicates that the species was originally described in a genus other than Chloracris.
