= Typhoptera =

Scientific classification
- Domain: Eukaryota
- Kingdom: Animalia
- Phylum: Arthropoda
- Class: Insecta
- Order: Orthoptera
- Suborder: Ensifera
- Family: Tettigoniidae
- Subfamily: Pseudophyllinae
- Tribe: Cymatomerini
- Genus: Typhoptera; Kirby, 1906

Type species
- Pseudophyllus 4-tuberculatus Westwood, 1848

Synonyms
- Capnoptera Redtenbacher, 1895; Capnopterodes Strand, 1926; Thyphoptera Zacher, 1909

Genus of cricket-like animals

External image
- Image at iNaturalist

Typhoptera is an Asian genus of bush-crickets in the tribe Cymatomerini and the subfamily Pseudophyllinae. Species are recorded from India, Indo-China and Malesia.

== Species ==
Species include:

- Typhoptera obliquevenosa Beier, 1954
- Typhoptera pallidemaculata (Brunner von Wattenwyl, 1895)
- Typhoptera pfeifferae (Brunner von Wattenwyl, 1895)
- Typhoptera quadrituberculata (Westwood, 1848)
- Typhoptera siamensis Karny, 1926
- Typhoptera staudingeri (Brunner von Wattenwyl, 1895)
- Typhoptera unicolor (Brunner von Wattenwyl, 1895)

Note: A binomial authority in parentheses indicates that the species was originally described in a genus other than Typhoptera.
