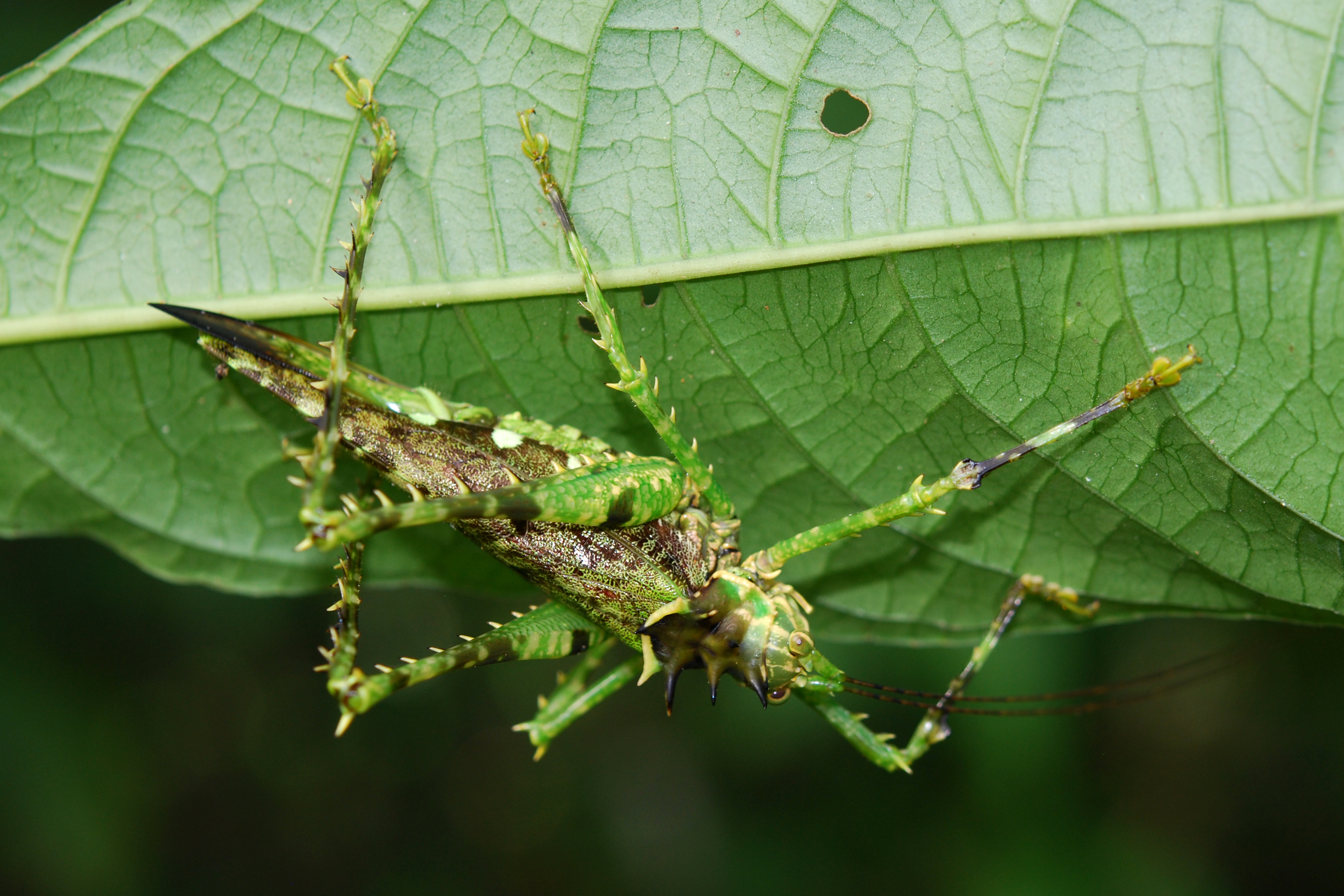
- Championica sp.

Scientific classification
- Domain: Eukaryota
- Kingdom: Animalia
- Phylum: Arthropoda
- Class: Insecta
- Order: Orthoptera
- Suborder: Ensifera
- Family: Tettigoniidae
- Subfamily: Pseudophyllinae
- Tribe: Pleminiini
- Genus: Championica; Saussure & Pictet, 1898

= Championica =

Genis of katydids

Championica is a genus of katydids in the family Tettigoniidae, tribe Pleminiini.
