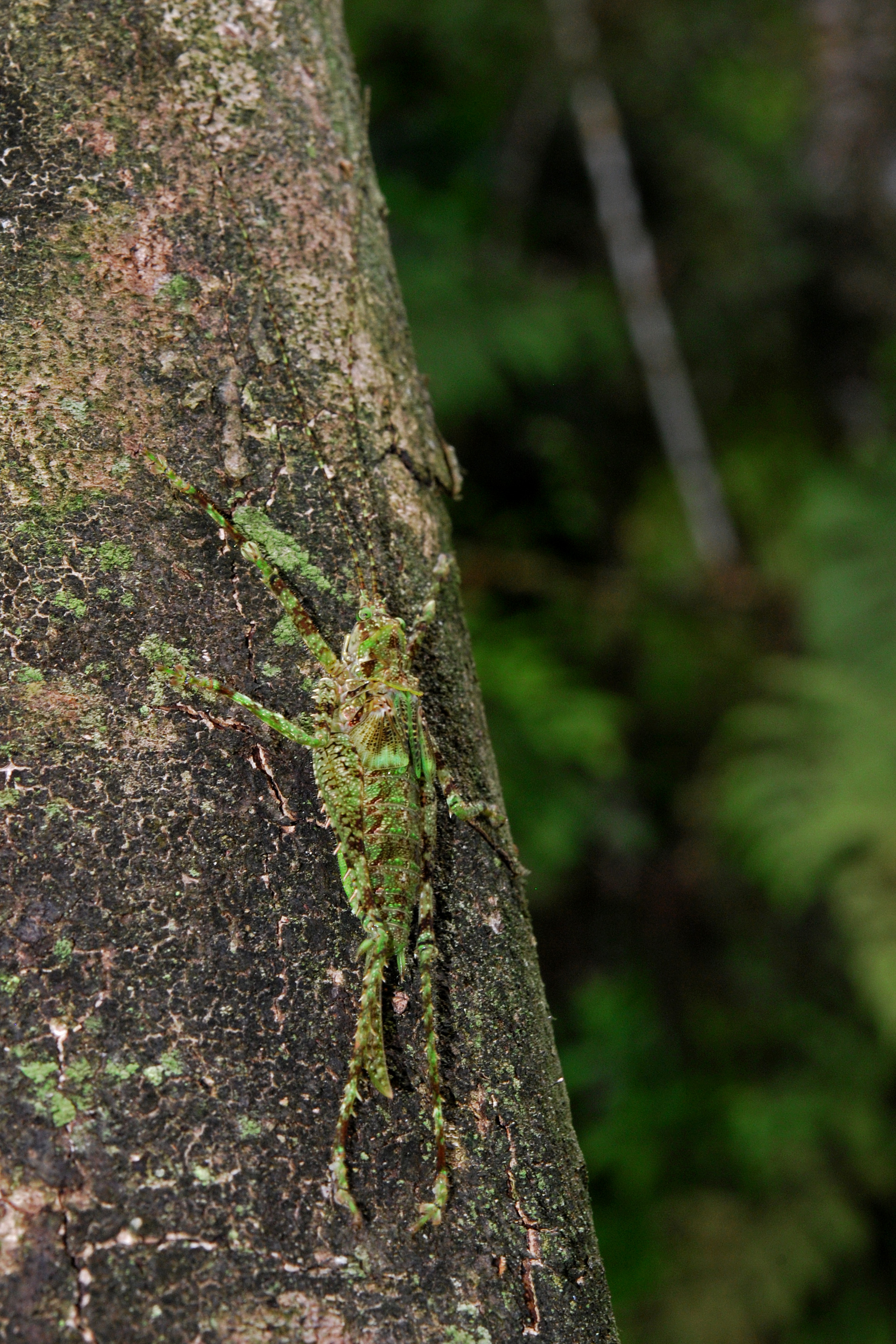
- Flickr - ggallice - Orthopteran

Scientific classification
- Domain: Eukaryota
- Kingdom: Animalia
- Phylum: Arthropoda
- Class: Insecta
- Order: Orthoptera
- Suborder: Ensifera
- Family: Tettigoniidae
- Subfamily: Pseudophyllinae
- Tribe: Pleminiini
- Genus: Acanthodis; Serville, 1831

= Acanthodis =

Genus of insects

Acanthodis is a genus of katydids belonging to the family Tettigoniidae.

The species of this genus are found in Southern America.

Species:

- Acanthodis aquilina (Linnaeus, 1758)
- Acanthodis chipmani (Bruner, 1906)
- Acanthodis curvidens (Stål, 1875)
- Acanthodis longicauda (Stål, 1874)
- Acanthodis tessellata (Brunner von Wattenwyl, 1895)
- Acanthodis unispinulosa (Brunner von Wattenwyl, 1895)
