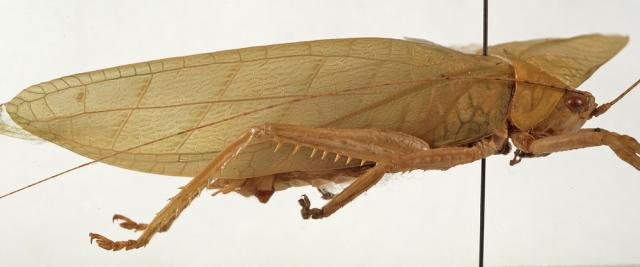
- Rhomboptera honorabilis

Scientific classification
- Kingdom: Animalia
- Phylum: Arthropoda
- Clade: Pancrustacea
- Class: Insecta
- Order: Orthoptera
- Suborder: Ensifera
- Family: Tettigoniidae
- Subfamily: Pseudophyllinae
- Tribe: Pseudophyllini
- Genus: Rhomboptera; Redtenbacher, 1895

Type species
- Rhomboptera honorabilis Brunner von Wattenwyl, 1895

= Rhomboptera =

Genus of katydids

Rhomboptera is a genus of Asian katydids or bush crickets in the family Tettigoniidae and tribe Pseudophyllini. It was first described in 1895 by Austrian entomologist Josef Redtenbacher, while its type species was described at the same time by German entomologist Carl Brunner von Wattenwyl.

== Description ==
Like many bush crickets, Rhomboptera individuals have wings that mimic leaves: a form of camouflage to hide from predators. They can reach a total length of 47 mm (1.9 in), which includes wings.

== Distribution ==
Rhomboptera is found in South and Southeast Asia; citizen science observations indicate that species can be found in the following countries: India, Bhutan, China, Thailand, Laos, Vietnam, Indonesia, Malaysia, and Brunei.

== Species ==
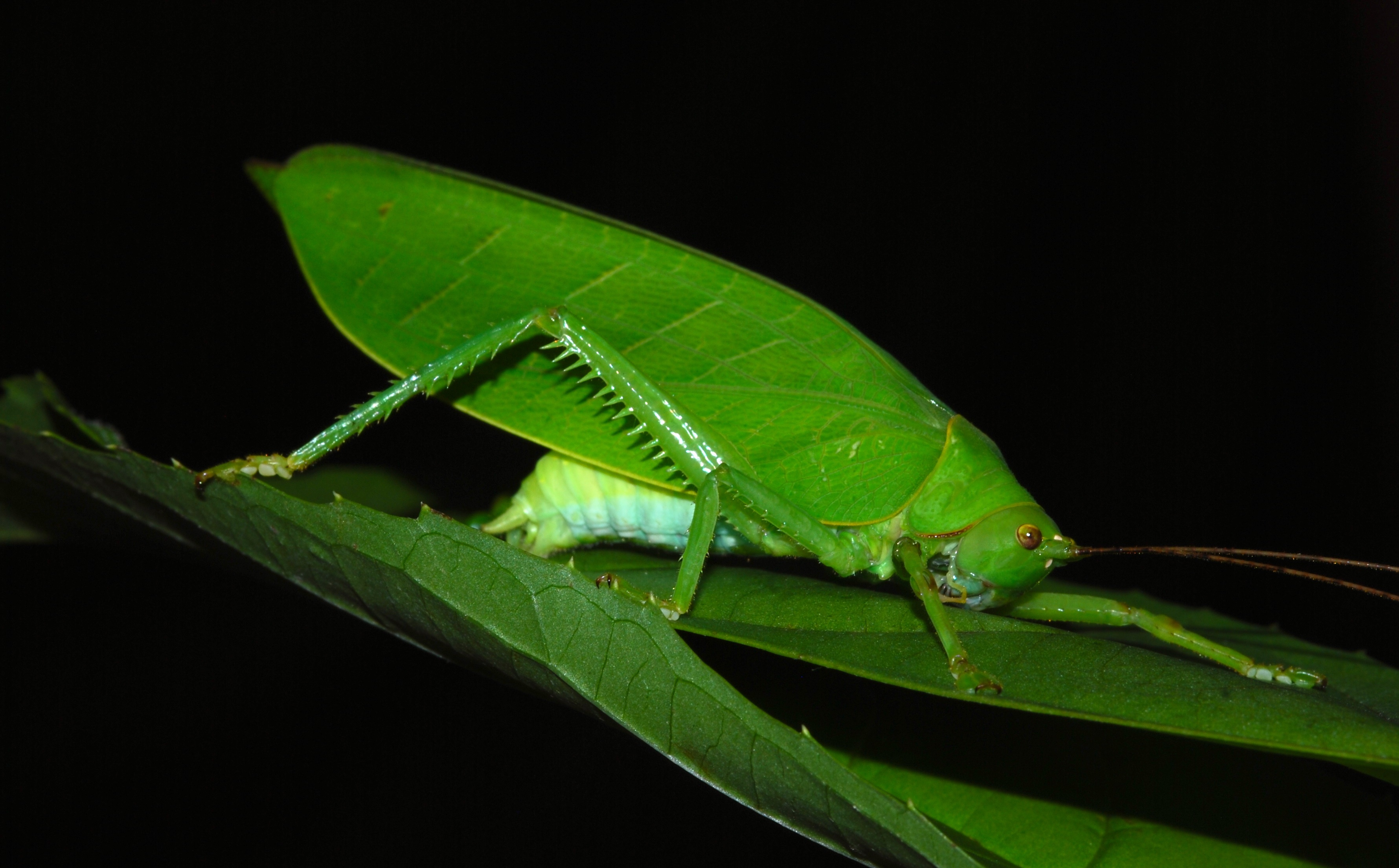
Rhomboptera semilunata

The genus Rhomboptera includes:

1. Rhomboptera honorabilis Brunner von Wattenwyl, 1895
2. Rhomboptera ligata Brunner von Wattenwyl, 1895
3. Rhomboptera selangorensis Muzamil, 2005
4. Rhomboptera semilunata de Jong, 1939
