= Stridulation =

Act of producing sound by rubbing together certain body parts

Grasshopper stridulation
Several unidentified grasshoppers stridulating.

Ant stridulations
Pachycondyla apicalis
Stridulations from a Pachycondyla apicalis worker.

Pachycondyla verenae
Stridulations from a Pachycondyla verenae worker.

Pheidole pallidula
Stridulations from a Pheidole pallidula worker.

Stridulation is the act of producing sound by rubbing together certain body parts. This behavior is mostly associated with insects, but other animals are known to do this as well, such as a number of species of fish, snakes and spiders. The mechanism is typically that of one structure with a well-defined lip, ridge, or nodules (the "scraper" or plectrum) being moved across a finely-ridged surface (the "file" or stridulitrum—sometimes called the pars stridens) or vice versa, and vibrating as it does so, like the dragging of a phonograph needle across a vinyl record. Sometimes it is the structure bearing the file which resonates to produce the sound, but in other cases it is the structure bearing the scraper, with both variants possible in related groups. Common onomatopoeic words for the sounds produced by stridulation include chirp and chirrup.

== Arthropod stridulation ==
Stridulation in Subpsaltria yangi

Insects and other arthropods stridulate by rubbing together two parts of the body. These are referred to generically as the stridulatory organs.

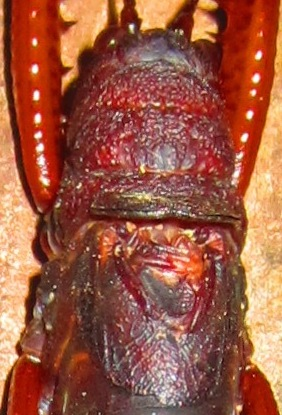
Detail of anterior dorsal aspect of a male katydid of the genus Panoploscelis. The tegmina constitute the sound generator for these insects.

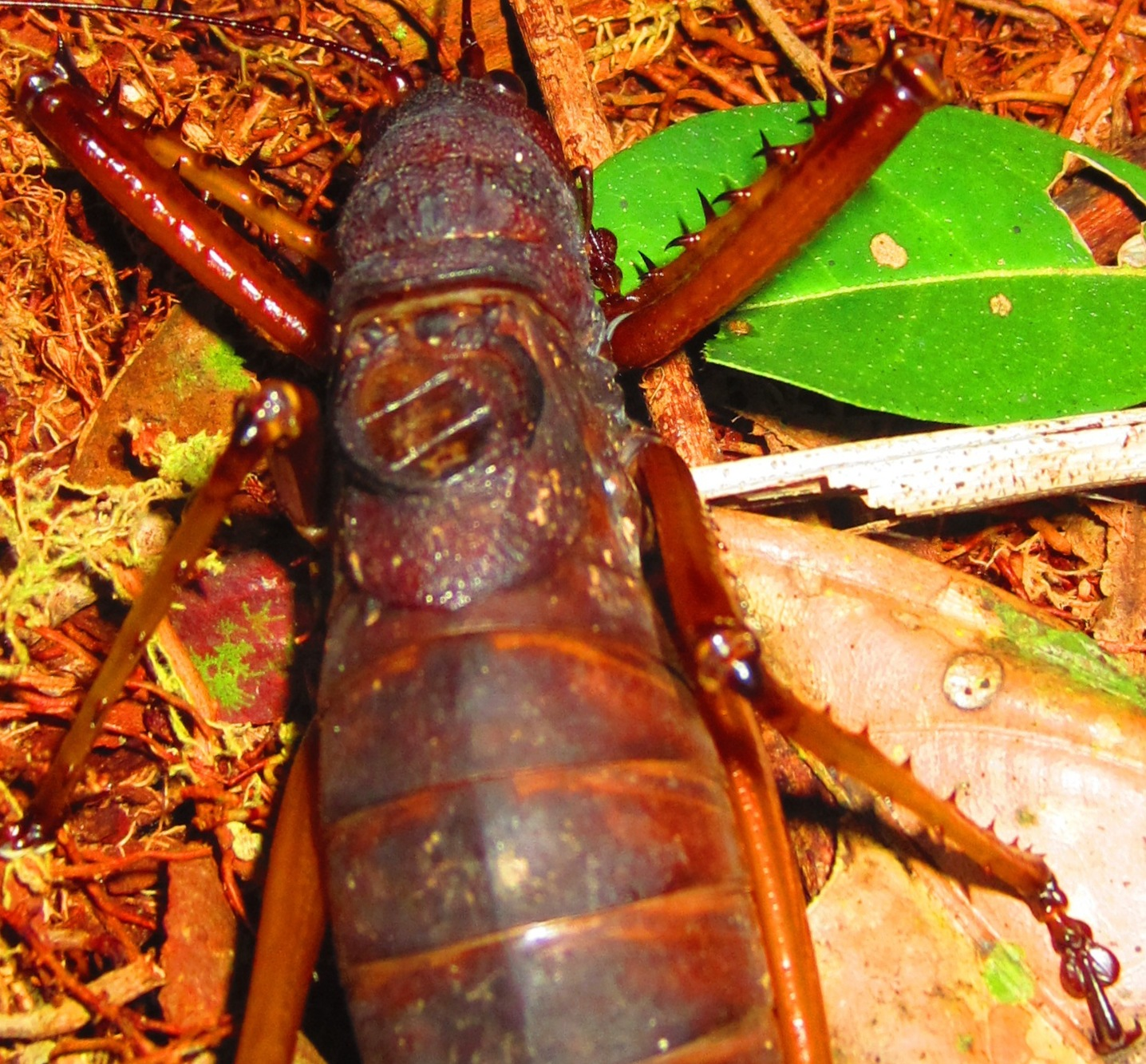
Detail of anterior dorsal aspect of a female Panoploscelis specularis katydid. The scraper lobe can be seen on the right side of the left tegmen. The crossveins of the right tegmen are not visible, as the left tegmen overlies the right.

The mechanism is best known in crickets, mole crickets, and grasshoppers, but other insects which stridulate include Curculionidae (weevils and bark beetles), Cerambycidae (longhorned beetles), Mutillidae ("velvet ants"), Reduviidae (assassin bugs), Buprestidae (metallic wood-boring beetles), Hydrophilidae (water scavenger beetles), Cicindelinae (tiger beetles), Scarabaeidae (scarab beetles), Glaresidae ("enigmatic scarabs"), larval Lucanidae (stag beetles), Passalidae (Bessbugs), Geotrupidae (earth-boring dung beetles), Alydidae (broad-headed bugs), Largidae (bordered plant bugs), Miridae (leaf bugs), Corixidae (water boatmen, notably Micronecta scholtzi), various ants (including the Black imported fire ant, Solenopsis richteri), some stick insects such as Pterinoxylus spinulosus, and some species of Agromyzidae (leaf-mining flies). While cicadas are well-known for sound production via abdominal tymbal organs, it has been demonstrated that some species can produce sounds via stridulation, as well.

Stridulation is also known in a few tarantulas (Arachnida), certain centipedes, such as Scutigera coleoptrata, and some pill millipedes (Diplopoda, Oniscomorpha). It is also widespread among decapod crustaceans, e.g., rock lobsters. Most spiders are silent, but some tarantula species are known to stridulate. When disturbed, Theraphosa blondi, the Goliath tarantula, can produce a rather loud hissing noise by rubbing together the bristles on its legs. This is said to be audible to a distance of up to 15 feet (4.5 m). One of the wolf spiders, Schizocosa stridulans, produces low-frequency sounds by flexing its abdomen (tremulation, rather than stridulation) or high-frequency stridulation by using the cymbia on the ends of its pedipalps. In most species of spiders, stridulation commonly occurs by males during sexual encounters. In the species Holocnemus pluchei, females also possess stridulatory organs, and both sexes engage in stridulation. In the species Steatoda nobilis, the males produce stridulation sounds during mating.

The anatomical parts used to produce sound are quite varied: the most common system is that seen in grasshoppers and many other insects, where a hind leg scraper is rubbed against the adjacent forewing (in beetles and true bugs the forewings are hardened); in crickets and katydids a file on one wing is rubbed by a scraper on the other wing; in longhorned beetles, the back edge of the pronotum scrapes against a file on the mesonotum; in various other beetles, the sound is produced by moving the head—up/down or side-to-side—while in others the abdominal tergites are rubbed against the elytra; in assassin bugs, the tip of the mouthparts scrapes along a ridged groove in the prosternum; in velvet ants the back edge of one abdominal tergite scrapes a file on the dorsal surface of the following tergite.

Green Katydid Grasshopper call

Stridulation in several of these examples is for attracting a mate, or as a form of territorial behaviour, but can also be a warning signal (acoustic aposematism, as in velvet ants and tarantulas). This kind of communication was first described by Slovenian biologist Ivan Regen (1868–1947).

== Vertebrate stridulation ==
Some species of venomous snakes stridulate as part of a threat display. They arrange their body into a series of parallel C-shaped (counterlooped) coils that they rub together to produce a sizzling sound, rather like water on a hot plate. The best-known examples are members of the genus Echis (saw-scaled vipers), although those of the genus Cerastes (North African desert vipers) and at least one bush viper species, Atheris desaixi, do this as well. A bird species, the club-winged manakin, has a dedicated stridulation apparatus, while a species of mammal, the lowland streaked tenrec, (Hemicentetes semispinosus) produces a high-pitched noise by rubbing together specialised quills on its back.
