= Acyrophyllum =

Scientific classification
- Domain: Eukaryota
- Kingdom: Animalia
- Phylum: Arthropoda
- Class: Insecta
- Order: Orthoptera
- Suborder: Ensifera
- Family: Tettigoniidae
- Subfamily: Pseudophyllinae
- Tribe: Platyphyllini
- Genus: Acyrophyllum; Beier, 1960
- Species: A. exiguum

Binomial name
- Acyrophyllum exiguum (Brunner von Wattenwyl, 1895)

Synonyms
- Acrophyllum Beier, 1963 (Missp.)

Genus of katydids

Acyrophyllum is a genus of katydids, containing a single species, Acyrophyllum exiguum. The genus name is commonly misspelled as Acrophyllum.
