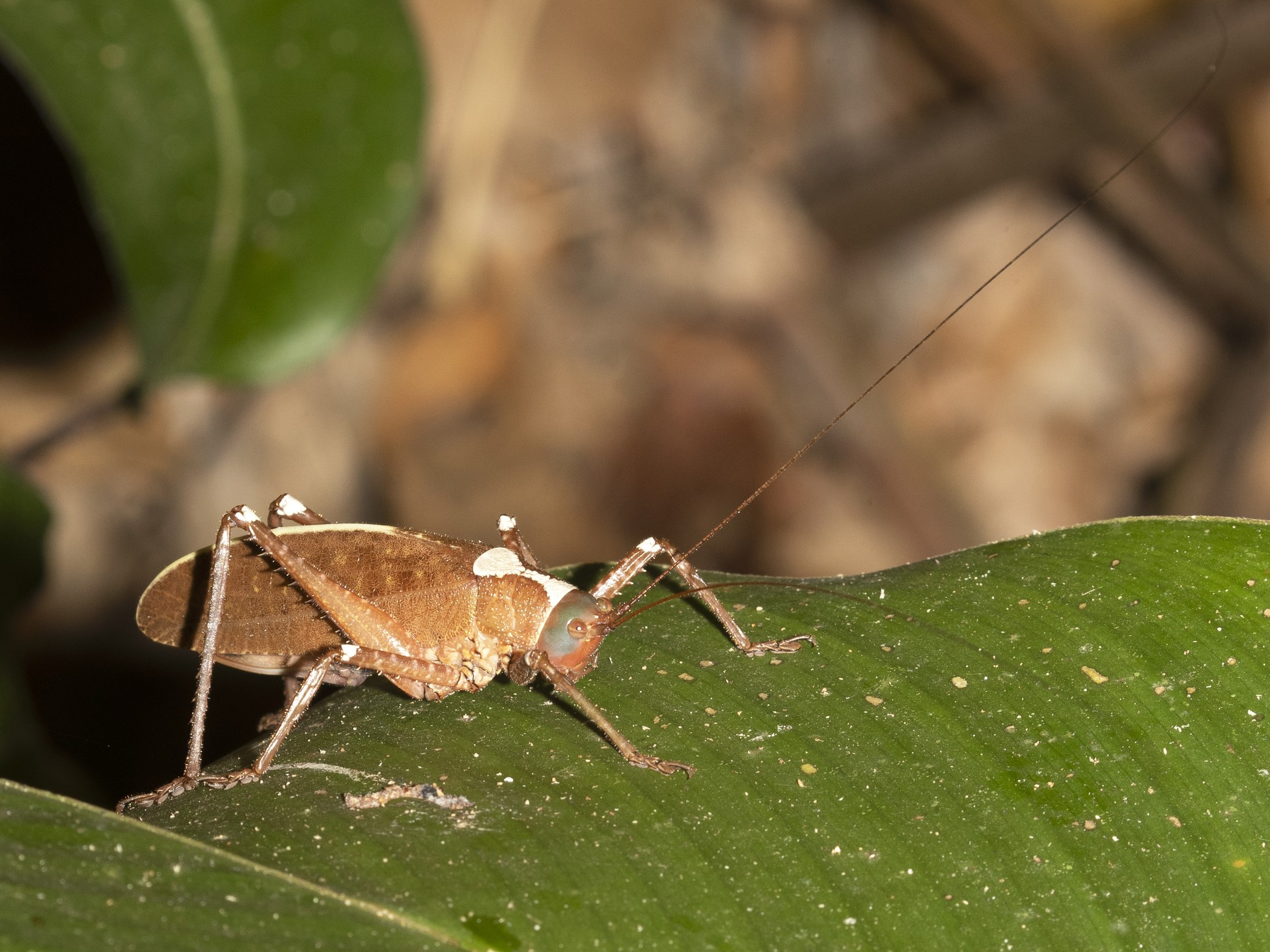
- Xiphophyllum limbatum

Scientific classification
- Domain: Eukaryota
- Kingdom: Animalia
- Phylum: Arthropoda
- Class: Insecta
- Order: Orthoptera
- Suborder: Ensifera
- Family: Tettigoniidae
- Subfamily: Pseudophyllinae
- Tribe: Platyphyllini
- Genus: Xiphophyllum; Beier, 1960

= Xiphophyllum (katydid) =

Genus of katydids

Xiphophyllum is a genus of bush crickets in the tribe Platyphyllini.

The species of this genus are found in South America.

== Species ==
- Xiphophyllum abbreviatum (Brunner von Wattenwyl, 1895)
- Xiphophyllum acuminatum (Brunner von Wattenwyl, 1895)
- Xiphophyllum angustelaminatum Beier, 1960
- Xiphophyllum atricauda (Caudell, 1918)
- Xiphophyllum atrosignatum (Brunner von Wattenwyl, 1895)
- Xiphophyllum brunneum Beier, 1960
- Xiphophyllum connexum (Brunner von Wattenwyl, 1895)
- Xiphophyllum granosum (Brunner von Wattenwyl, 1895)
- Xiphophyllum latipenne Beier, 1960
- Xiphophyllum limbatum Beier, 1960
- Xiphophyllum pallidenotatum (Brunner von Wattenwyl, 1895)
- Xiphophyllum unicolor Beier, 1960
- Xiphophyllum verrucosum (Brunner von Wattenwyl, 1895)
