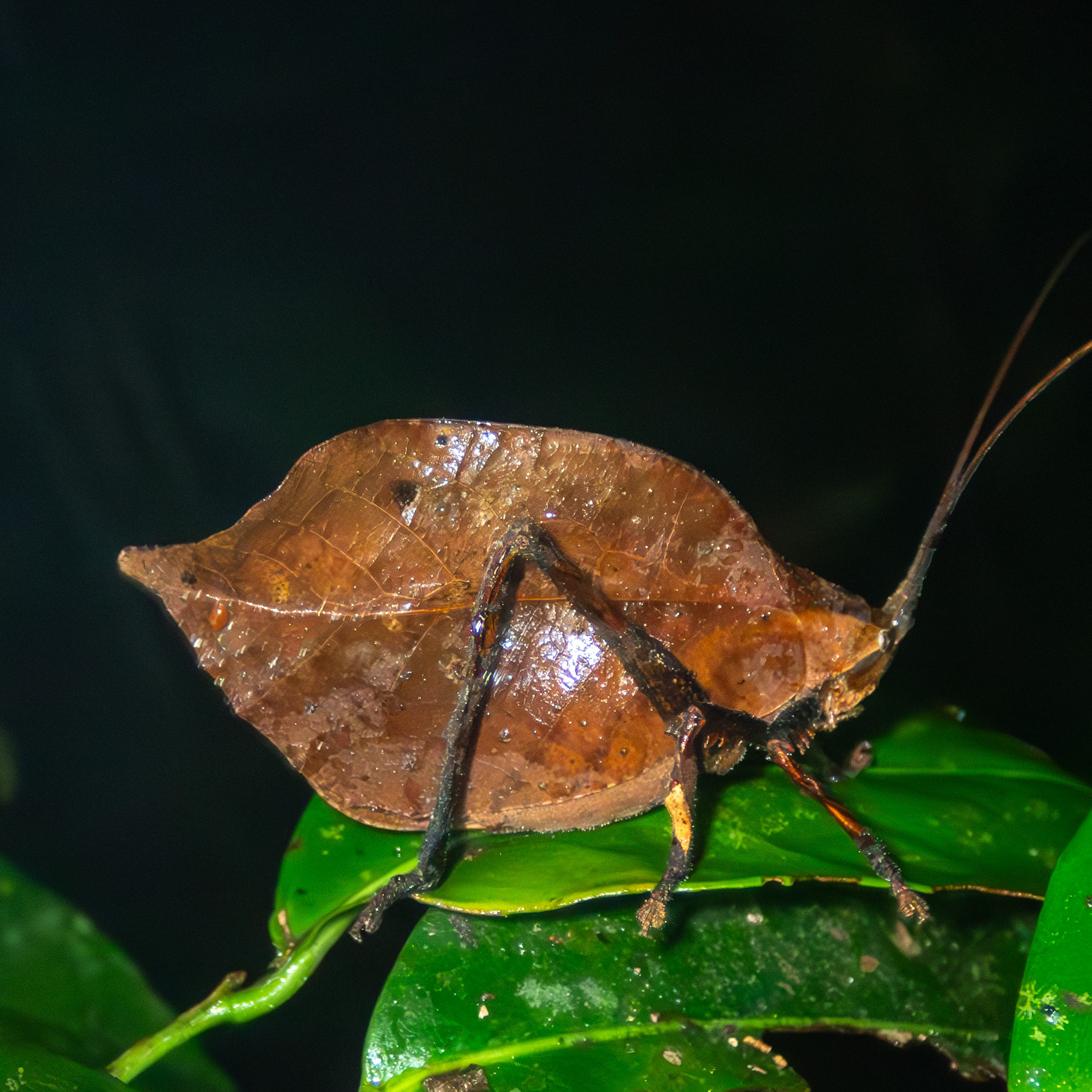
- Mimetica incisa pictured in Monteverde, Costa Rica in 2024

Scientific classification
- Kingdom: Animalia
- Phylum: Arthropoda
- Class: Insecta
- Order: Orthoptera
- Suborder: Ensifera
- Family: Tettigoniidae
- Subfamily: Pterochrozinae
- Tribe: Pterochrozini
- Genus: Mimetica; Pictet, 1888

Species
- See text

= Mimetica =

Genus of leaf-mimicking katydids

Mimetica is a genus of leaf-mimic katydids of the family Tettigoniidae, found in northern Latin America.

== Distribution ==
There are fifteen Mimetica species found in nine countries. Several species have not been studied beyond a few specimens, and are therefore known from very few locations. The northernmost species is Mimetica stigmatica, described from near Guadalajara in central Mexico; the southernmost is Mimetica imperatrix, described from Bucay, Ecuador. No species apart from M. stigmatica are known from Mexico; the next-northernmost species, Mimetica angulosa and Mimetica mortuifolia, have been found in Guatemala. The citizen science project iNaturalist has recorded M. mortuifolia and Mimetica incisa from Belize. Further down the isthmus of Central America, M. incisa can also be found in Nicaragua, as well as in Costa Rica, which is home to six species, five of which were originally described from there (the exception being M. mortulifolia). Three species are known from Panama, four from Colombia and one, Mimetica simoni, from Venezuela.

Distribution of Mimetica species
Country	Species		
Mexico	Mimetica stigmatica		
Guatemala	Mimetica angulosa	Mimetica mortuifolia	
Belize (Note: Based only on iNaturalist observations)	Mimetica incisa	Mimetica mortuifolia	
Nicaragua	Mimetica incisa	—	—
Costa Rica	Mimetica incisa	Mimetica tuberata	Mimetica mortuifolia
Costa Rica	Mimetica incisa	Mimetica aridifolia	Mimetica crenulata
Costa Rica	Mimetica incisa	Mimetica viridifolia	—
Panama	Mimetica incisa	Mimetica viridifolia	Mimetica siccifolia
Colombia	Mimetica castanea	Mimetica pehlkei	
Colombia	Mimetica semialata	Mimetica subintegra	
Venezuela	Mimetica simoni		
Ecuador	Mimetica imperatrix		
