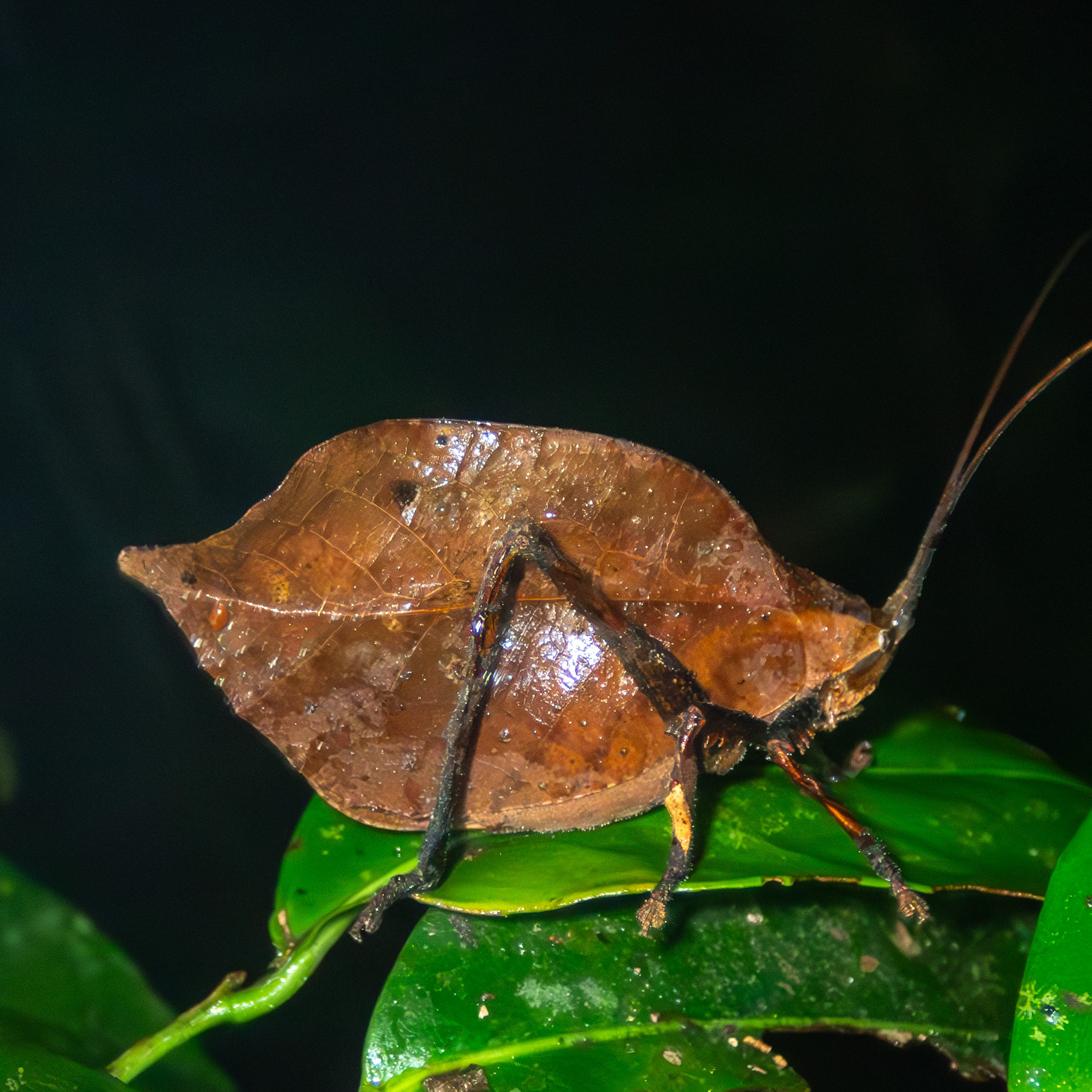

Scientific classification
- Kingdom: Animalia
- Phylum: Arthropoda
- Class: Insecta
- Order: Orthoptera
- Suborder: Ensifera
- Family: Tettigoniidae
- Genus: Mimetica
- Species: M. incisa

Binomial name
- Mimetica incisa (Stål, 1875)

Synonyms
- Cycloptera incisa Stål, 1875

= Mimetica incisa =

Species of insect

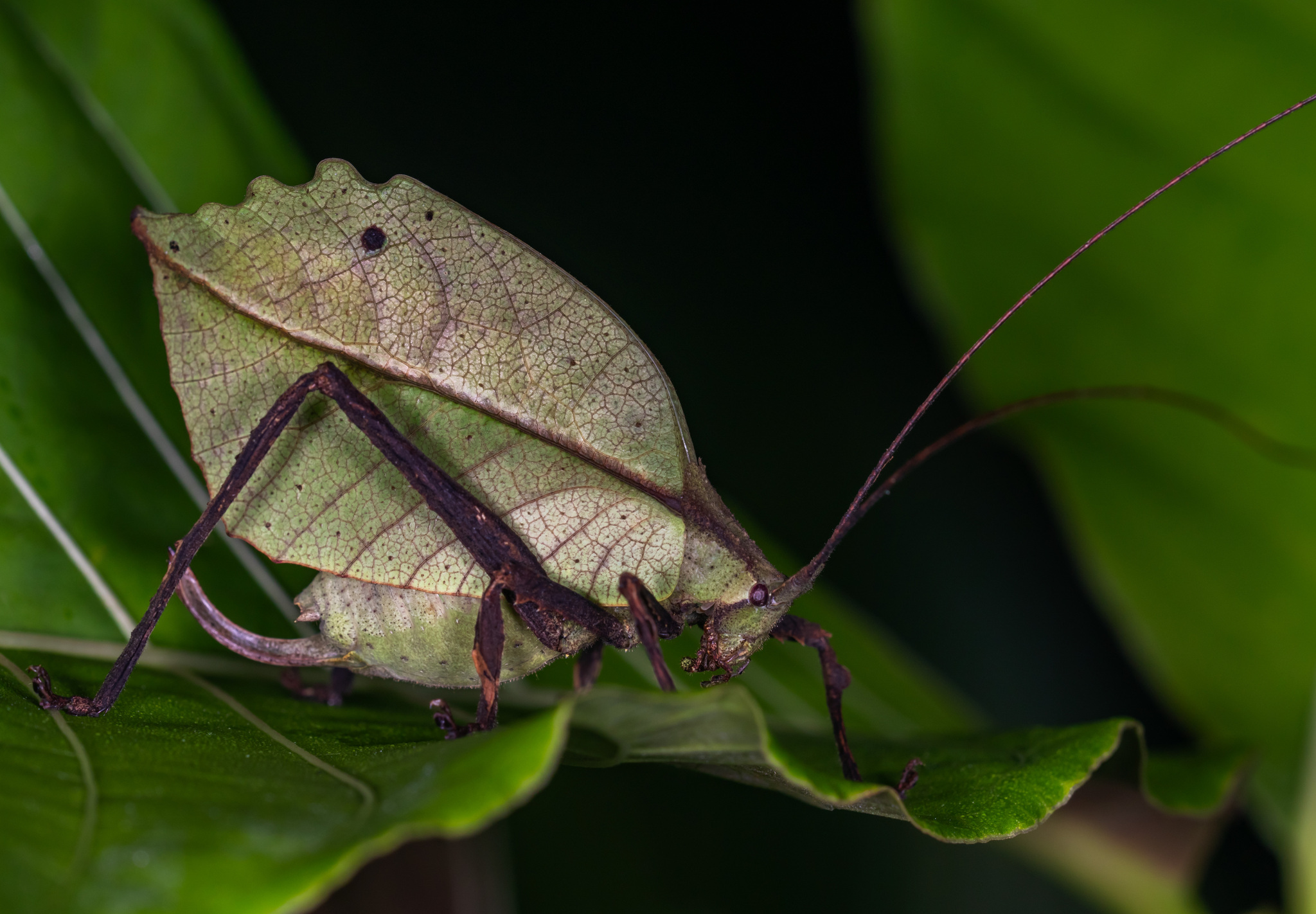
M. incisa pictured in Heredia Province, Costa Rica.

Mimetica incisa is a species of katydid described by Stål in 1875.

== Taxonomy ==
Mimetica incisa was first scientifically described by Carl Stål in the genus Cycloptera, with the name Cycloptera incisa. Stål published his description in an article in the Appendix to the Proceedings of the Royal Swedish Academy of Sciences in 1875, along with descriptions of many other new species. He discovered M. incisa in Chiriquí Province, in western Panamá.

In 1898 Henri de Saussure and Alphonse Pictet described what they considered a new species of katydid and named it Mimetica marmorata. The description was based on specimens collected in Cachí, Costa Rica and Tolé District in Chiruquí, Panama. In 1924, however, Paul Vignon synonymized M. marmorata with Cycloptera incsia. Stål's species was given taxonomic priority but was transferred to the genus Mimetica, thus yielding two synonyms: C. incisa (homotypic) and M. marmorata (heterotypic).

American entomologist Morgan Hebard later suggested in a 1927 paper that M. marmorata might be synonymous with Mimetica viridifolia. Hebard noted that the degree of individual variation in the species was not well understood, nor was the degree of sexual dimorphism present in Mimetica. He drily noted "that species should be proposed only after very careful consideration of all data available. It appears very possible that already too many species have been described of the phylum to which the present insect belongs." Vignon would later note that Hebard's view was invalid given his own earlier reassessment of the species, and stand by his synonymy of marmorata with incisa.
