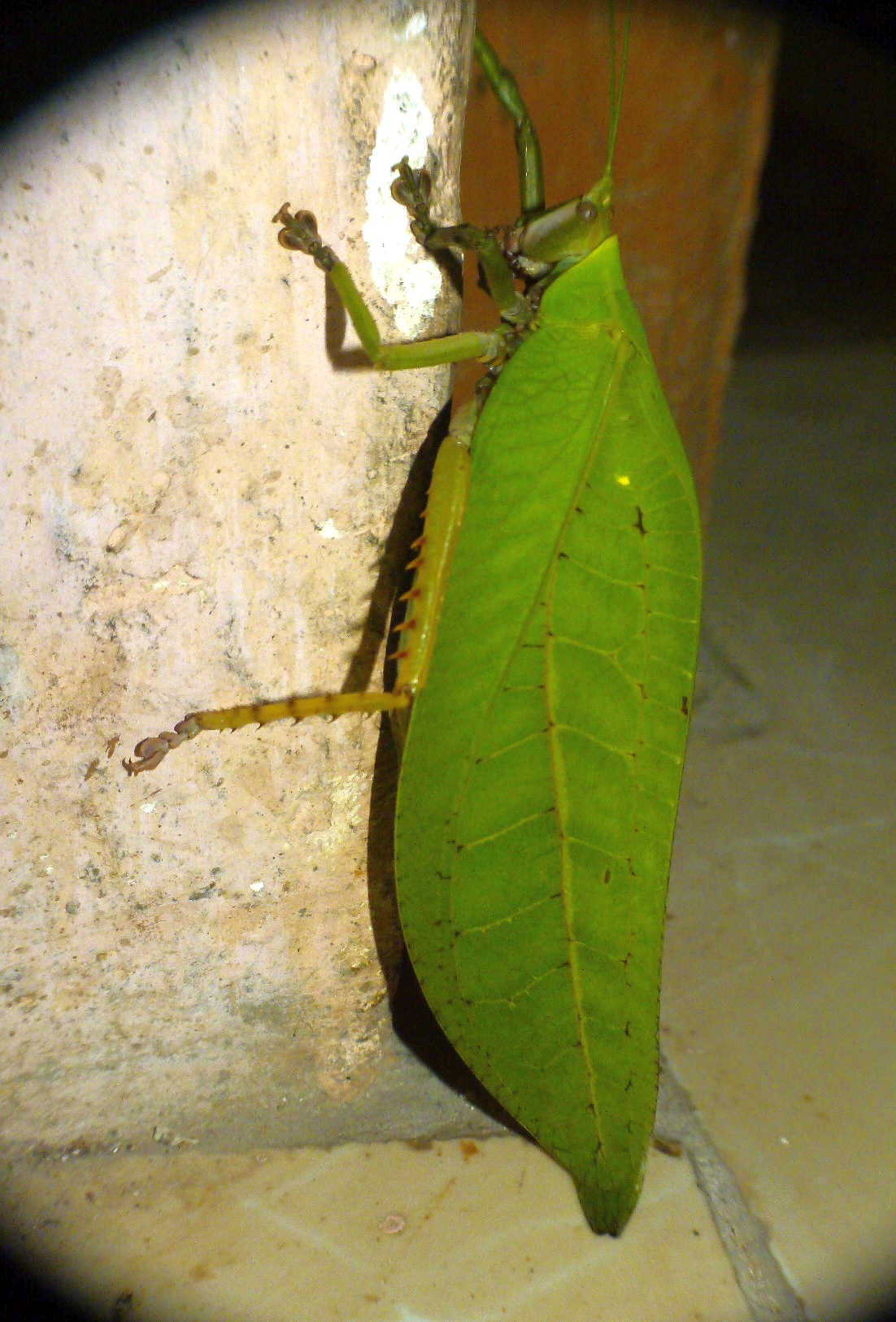

Scientific classification
- Kingdom: Animalia
- Phylum: Arthropoda
- Class: Insecta
- Order: Orthoptera
- Suborder: Ensifera
- Family: Tettigoniidae
- Subfamily: Pseudophyllinae
- Genus: Onomarchus
- Species: O. uninotatus

Binomial name
- Onomarchus uninotatus (Serville, 1838)

= Onomarchus uninotatus =

Species of insect

Onomarchus uninotatus is a species of pseudophylline bush cricket from the family Tettigoniidae, native to South and Southeast Asia, and southern China. It is a fairly large leaf-like bush cricket where adults are green (often fading to brown in specimens) and on average measure about 6 cm (2.4 in) long in males and 7.5 cm (3.0 in) long in females; nymphs are smaller, have small wings and can be either green or brown. Both adults and nymphs of this common, nocturnal bush cricket are herbivorous and the species is sometimes considered a serious pest when feeding on the foliage of fruit trees, especially jackfruit.
