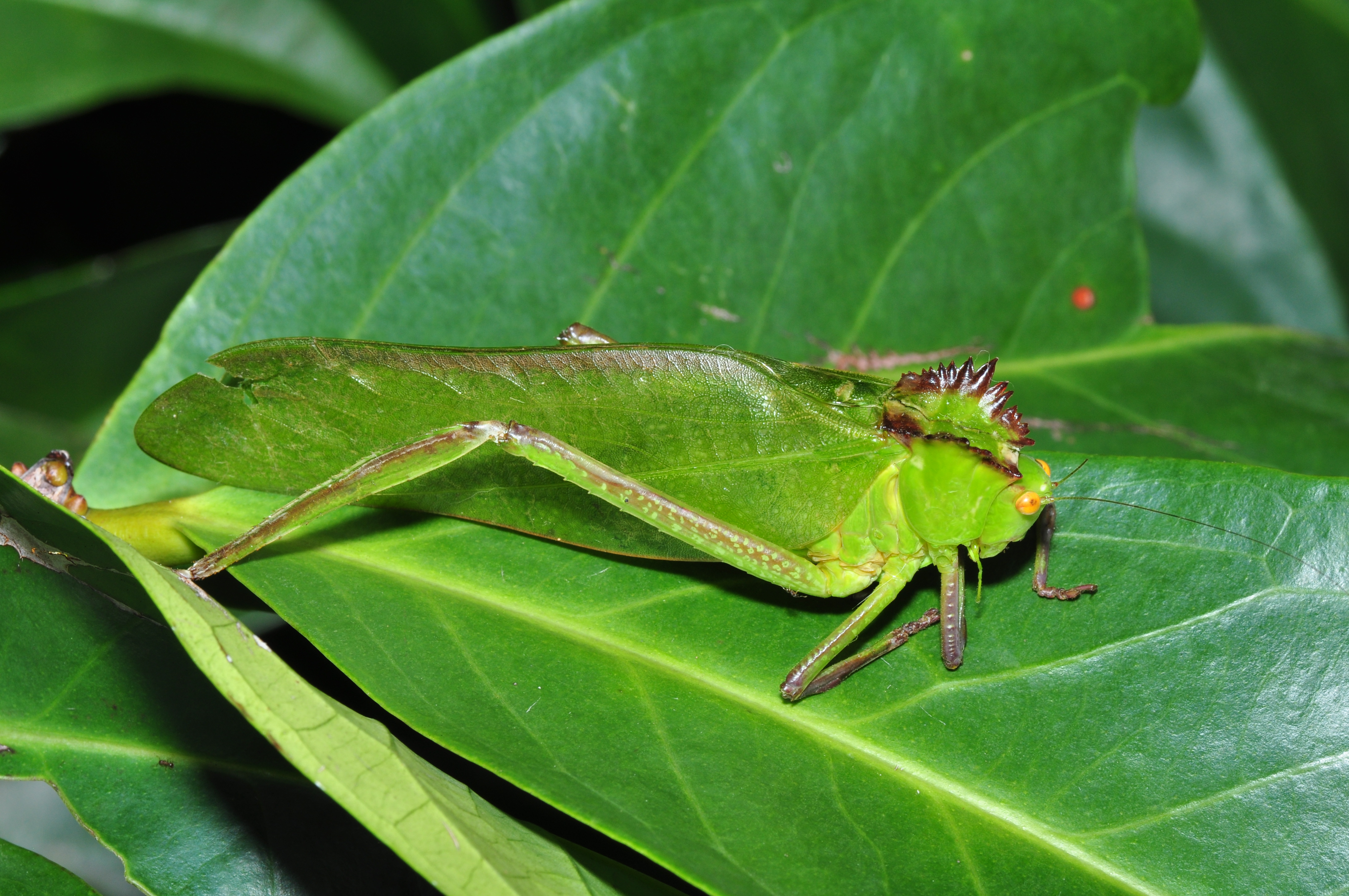
- Steirodon careovirgulatum

Scientific classification
- Domain: Eukaryota
- Kingdom: Animalia
- Phylum: Arthropoda
- Class: Insecta
- Order: Orthoptera
- Suborder: Ensifera
- Family: Tettigoniidae
- Subfamily: Phaneropterinae
- Tribe: Steirodontini
- Genus: Steirodon; Serville, 1831

= Steirodon =

Genus of cricket-like animals

Steirodon is a genus of large phaneropterine katydids in the family Tettigoniidae, native to tropical and subtropical forests in South America, Central America and Mexico.

They are fairly large to very large leaf-like katydids that are mostly green, between 5 and 13 cm (2.0–5.1 in) long depending on exact species, and females generally reach a larger size than males of the same species; S. careovirgulatum where females typically are 12–13 cm (4.7–5.1 in) long is the largest katydid of the Americas and among the world's largest Orthoptera. As far as known, Steirodon and all other members of the tribe Steirodontini are entirely herbivorous.

== Species ==
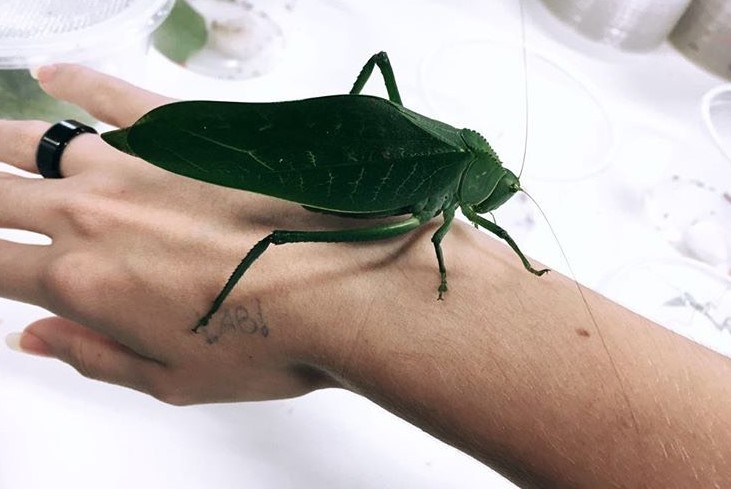
S. dentiferum is a fairly large species that is widespread in tropical South America; it is very similar to S. dentiferoides of eastern Brazil

There following species belongs to the genus Steirodon:

- Steirodon alfaroi (Rehn, 1944)
- Steirodon barcanti Emsley, 1970
- Steirodon barellum (Pictet, 1888)
- Steirodon bilobatoides Emsley, 1970
- Steirodon bilobatum (Scudder, 1875)
- Steirodon careovirgulatum Emsley, 1970
- Steirodon championi (Saussure & Pictet, 1898)
- Steirodon coronatum (Stål, 1874)
- Steirodon degeeri (Stål, 1874)
- Steirodon dentatum (Stål, 1874)
- Steirodon dentiferoides Emsley, 1970
- Steirodon dentiferum Walker, 1869
- Steirodon dohrni (Brunner von Wattenwyl, 1891)
- Steirodon emarginatum (Brunner von Wattenwyl, 1891)
- Steirodon emsleyi Piza, 1979
- Steirodon fastigiosum (Brunner von Wattenwyl, 1878)
- Steirodon flavolineatum (Bruner, 1915)
- Steirodon ganymedes (Rehn, 1944)
- Steirodon irregulariterdentatum (Brunner von Wattenwyl, 1891)
- Steirodon latipennis (Saussure & Pictet, 1898)
- Steirodon maroniensis Emsley, 1970
- Steirodon ponderosum Stål, 1873 – type species by subsequent designation
- Steirodon rarospinulosum (Brunner von Wattenwyl, 1891)
- Steirodon robertsorum Emsley, 1970
- Steirodon rufolineatum Emsley, 1970
- Steirodon sandrae Emsley, 1970
- Steirodon stalii (Brunner von Wattenwyl, 1878)
- Steirodon striolatus (Brunner von Wattenwyl, 1878)
- Steirodon sulcatum Emsley, 1970
- Steirodon unidentatum (Brunner von Wattenwyl, 1891)
- Steirodon validum Stål, 1874
