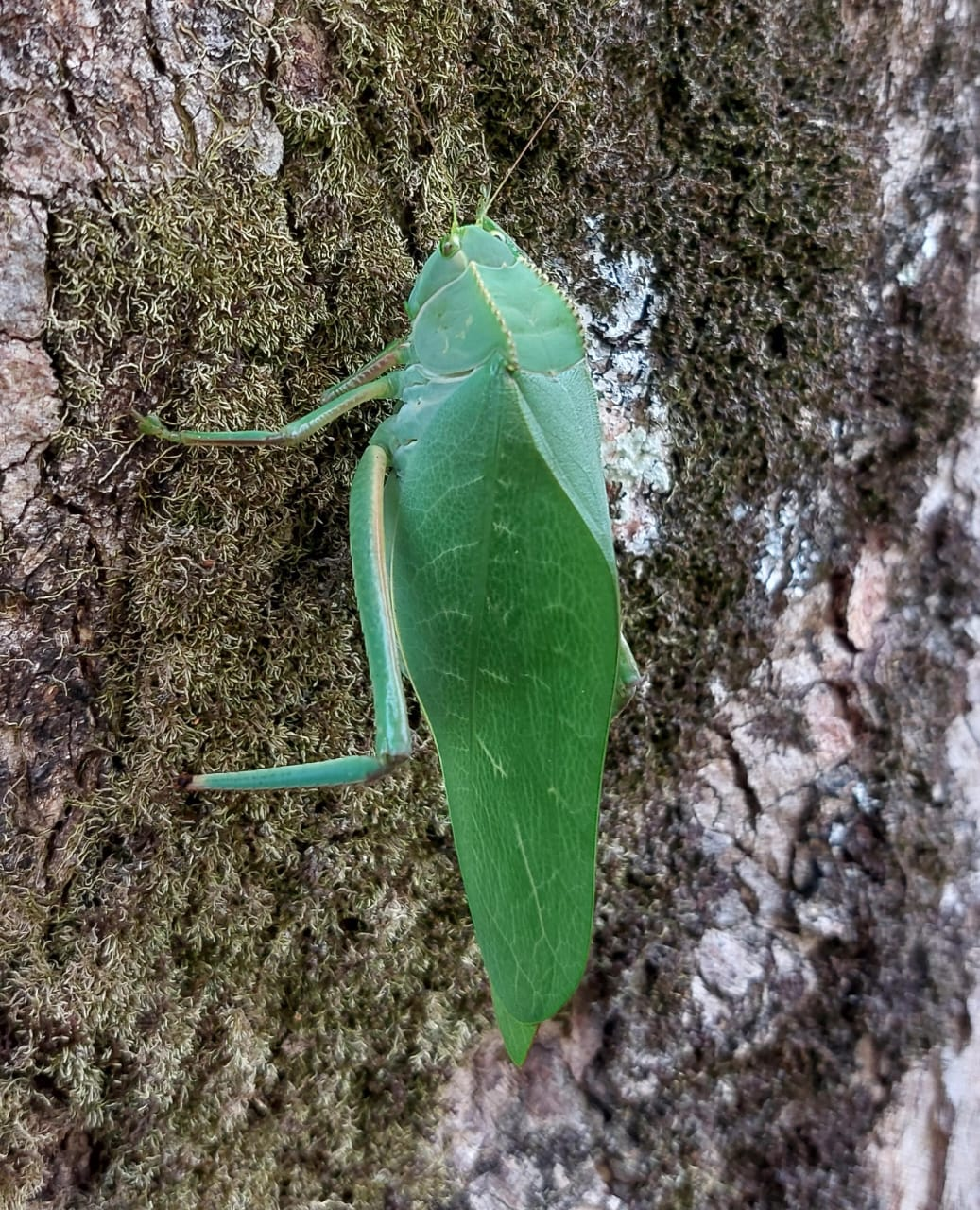

Scientific classification
- Domain: Eukaryota
- Kingdom: Animalia
- Phylum: Arthropoda
- Class: Insecta
- Order: Orthoptera
- Suborder: Ensifera
- Family: Tettigoniidae
- Subfamily: Phaneropterinae
- Genus: Steirodon
- Species: S. dentiferoides

Binomial name
- Steirodon dentiferoides Emsley, 1970

= Steirodon dentiferoides =

Genus of cricket-like animals

Steirodon dentiferoides is a species of leaf-like katyds in the family Tettigoniidae. It is found in eastern Brazil.

They are very similar to Steirodon dentiferum, being differentiated by the longer stridulatory files on males and females cannot be distinguished, the differences between the two species are mainly supported by the geographic distribution.
