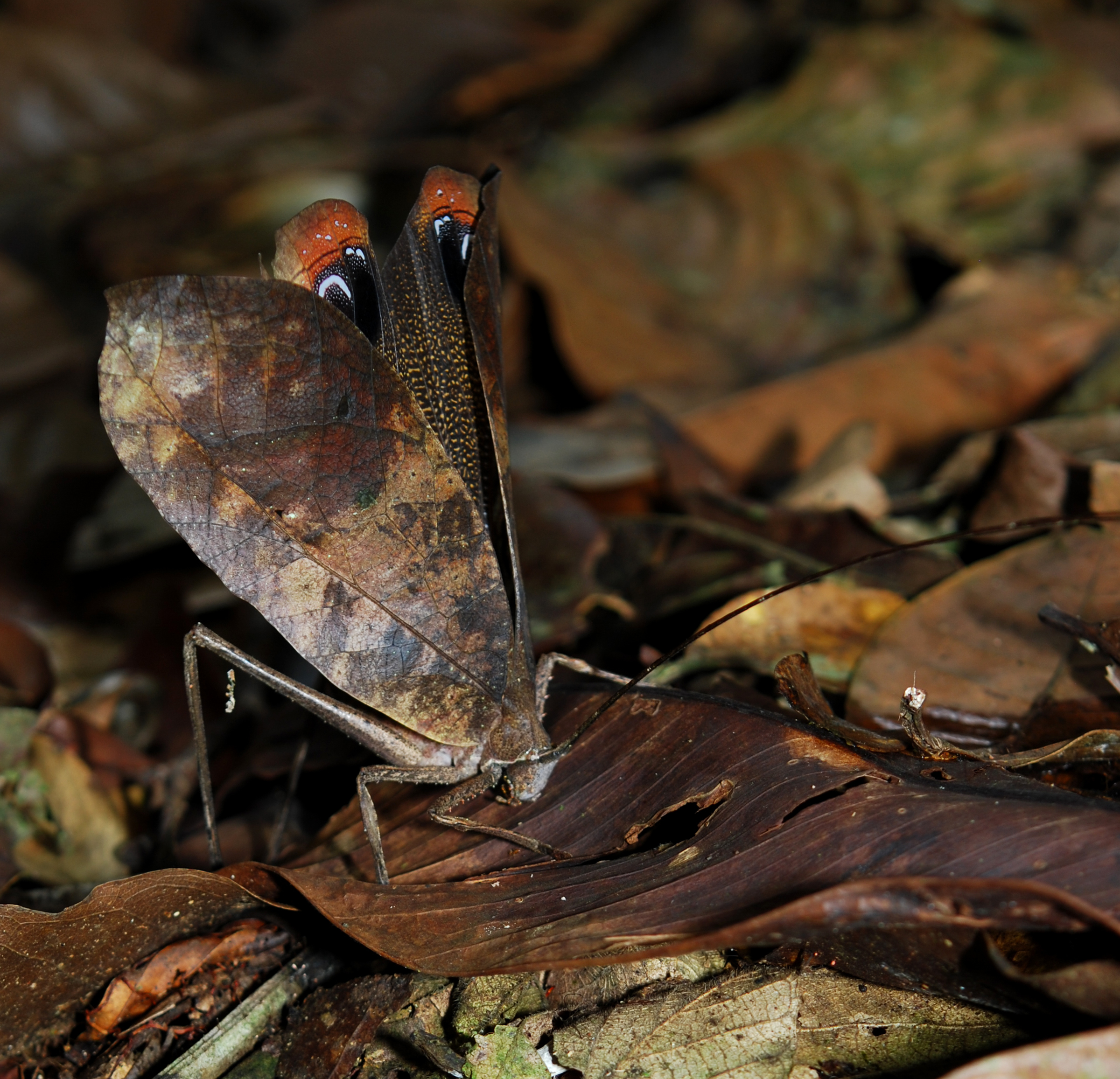
- Pterochroza ocellata in defensive stance

Scientific classification
- Kingdom: Animalia
- Phylum: Arthropoda
- Class: Insecta
- Order: Orthoptera
- Suborder: Ensifera
- Family: Tettigoniidae
- Subfamily: Pterochrozinae
- Genus: Pterochroza; Serville, 1831
- Species: P. ocellata

Binomial name
- Pterochroza ocellata (Linnaeus, 1758)

= Pterochroza =

Species of cricket-like animal

Pterochroza ocellata, the peacock katydid, is an insect in the family Tettigoniidae from the Amazon rainforest in South America. It is the only species in the genus Pterochroza. The species is a leaf-mimic katydid; when it is in repose its camouflage resembles a diseased or dead leaf. The katydid owes both its common name and its specific epithet (ocellata, meaning "marked with little eyes") to its startle display, in which it shows false eye spots on its normally hidden hind wings.

== Characteristics ==
The adult Pterochroza ocellata is about 45mm to 65mm in length. In its protective camouflage it resembles a dried leaf. If in spite of its camouflage it is threatened, the katydid exposes its hind wings, displaying two conspicuous eye spots.

No two individual Pterochroza ocellata are identical in their color pattern or the shape of the wings; this reduces the risk that predators could learn to recognize a fixed visual pattern. As in all katydids, their organs of hearing, or tympana, are on their front legs just below the joint between the femur and the tibia. The antennae are long, even for Tettigoniidae, being two to three times the length of the body.

== Habitats ==
Pterochroza ocellata was described by Carl Linnaeus in the 18th century. Monkeys are among its major predators.

== Eating habits ==
The diet of Pterochroza ocellata includes plant and animal detritus, as well as fresh leaves. It is not a predator.

== Reproductive behavior ==
As in most Tettigoniidae, the male attracts females with a high-pitched call, which it produces by rubbing one fore-wing over a scraper on the other fore-wing. This sound has been suggested to double as interference for the echolocation of bats, one of its many natural predators. When a female appears, the katydids first inspect each other with their antennae, then shake their bodies to gauge each other's size and strength. If the male does not retreat, the female will approach and they couple. Coupling lasts a few hours, during which the male will produce the spermatophylax and attaches it to the female's ovipositor. The spermatophylax is a gelatinous structure that contains the male's sperm cells as well as nutrients in the form of carbohydrates and proteins as a contribution towards the survival of the female and the offspring. The male's investment in the spermatophylax is considerable; it may exceed more than 20% of his body mass. The couple then separate and the female doubles over and consumes the spermatophylax.
