= Typophyllum spurioculis =

Scientific classification
- Domain: Eukaryota
- Kingdom: Animalia
- Phylum: Arthropoda
- Class: Insecta
- Order: Orthoptera
- Suborder: Ensifera
- Family: Tettigoniidae
- Genus: Typophyllum
- Species: T. spurioculis

Binomial name
- Typophyllum spurioculis Baker, Sarria-S., Morris, Jonsson & Montealegre-Z., 2017

Species of cricket-like animal

Typophyllum spurioculis is a species of day-camouflage leaf-mimicking katydids belonging to the genus Typophyllum. T. spurioculis lived in South America in the Andean cloud forest from western Ecuador, to Columbia in the middle central cordillera mountain range. They live in a habitat that revives 2000 millimeters to 4000 millimeters of rainfall and at elevations from 1850 meters to 2600 meters.

== Description ==
The legs on T. spurioculis have bright orange spots on them. Females of this species are larger than the males of this species.

=== Camouflage ===
The camouflage of typophyllum spurioculis appear as if they are bite-damaged leafs. The body of T. spurioculis also have areas with necrotic spots. Their camouflage is so effective that they look nearly invisible to the human eye.
