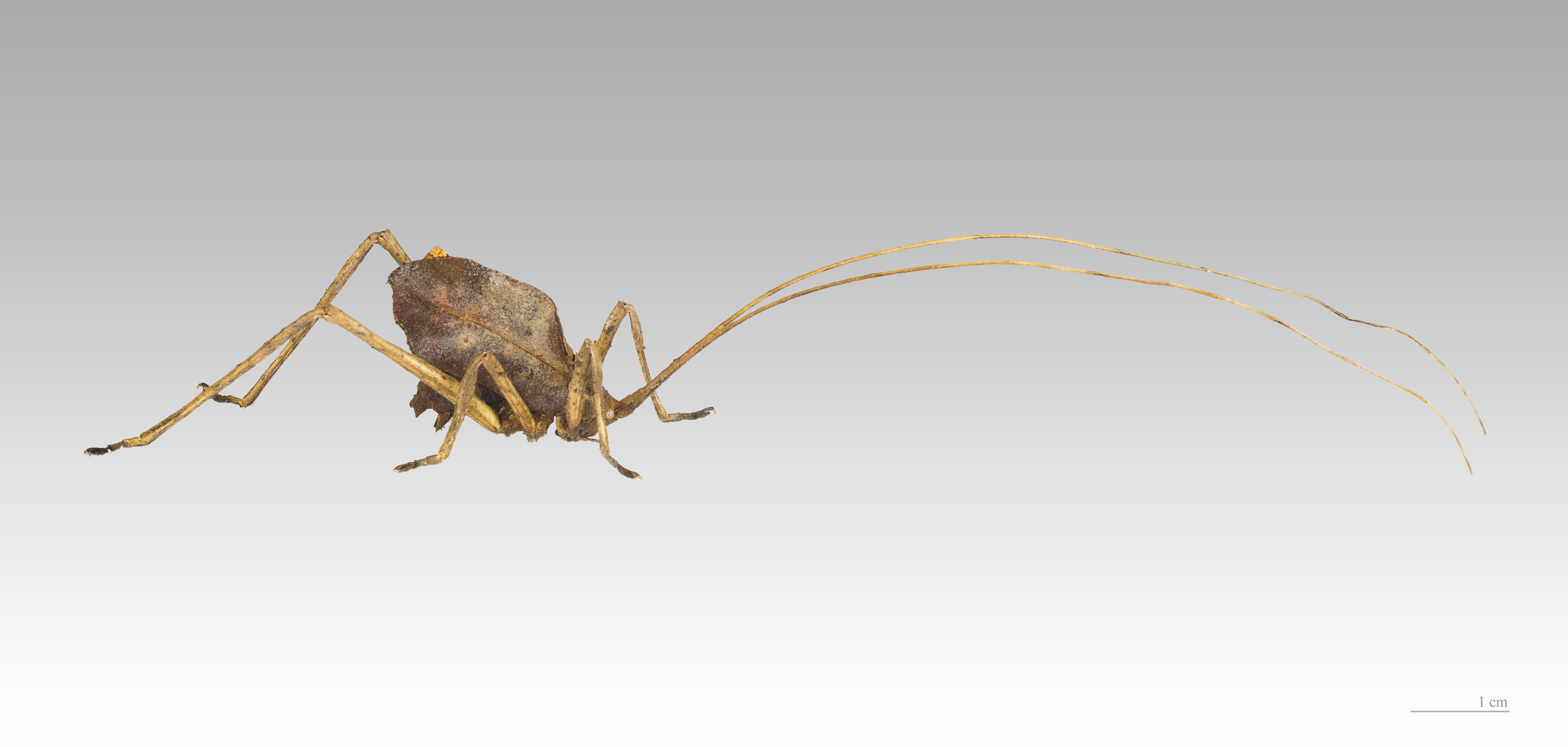
- Ommatoptera pictifolia

Scientific classification
- Domain: Eukaryota
- Kingdom: Animalia
- Phylum: Arthropoda
- Class: Insecta
- Order: Orthoptera
- Suborder: Ensifera
- Superfamily: Tettigonioidea
- Family: Tettigoniidae
- Subfamily: Pterochrozinae
- Genus: Ommatoptera; Pictet, 1888

Synonyms
- Pseudotanusia Vignon, 1923

= Ommatoptera =

Genus of cricket-like animals

Ommatoptera is a South American genus of katydids in the subfamily Pterochrozinae.

== Species ==
As of 2022, Orthoptera Species File lists:

- Ommatoptera boraceana Piza, 1979
- Ommatoptera elegans (Vignon, 1923)
- Ommatoptera laurifolia Pictet, 1888
- Ommatoptera mutila (Vignon, 1923)
- Ommatoptera pictifolia Walker, 1870
- Ommatoptera picturata (Serville, 1838)
- Ommatoptera pusilla (Vignon, 1923)
