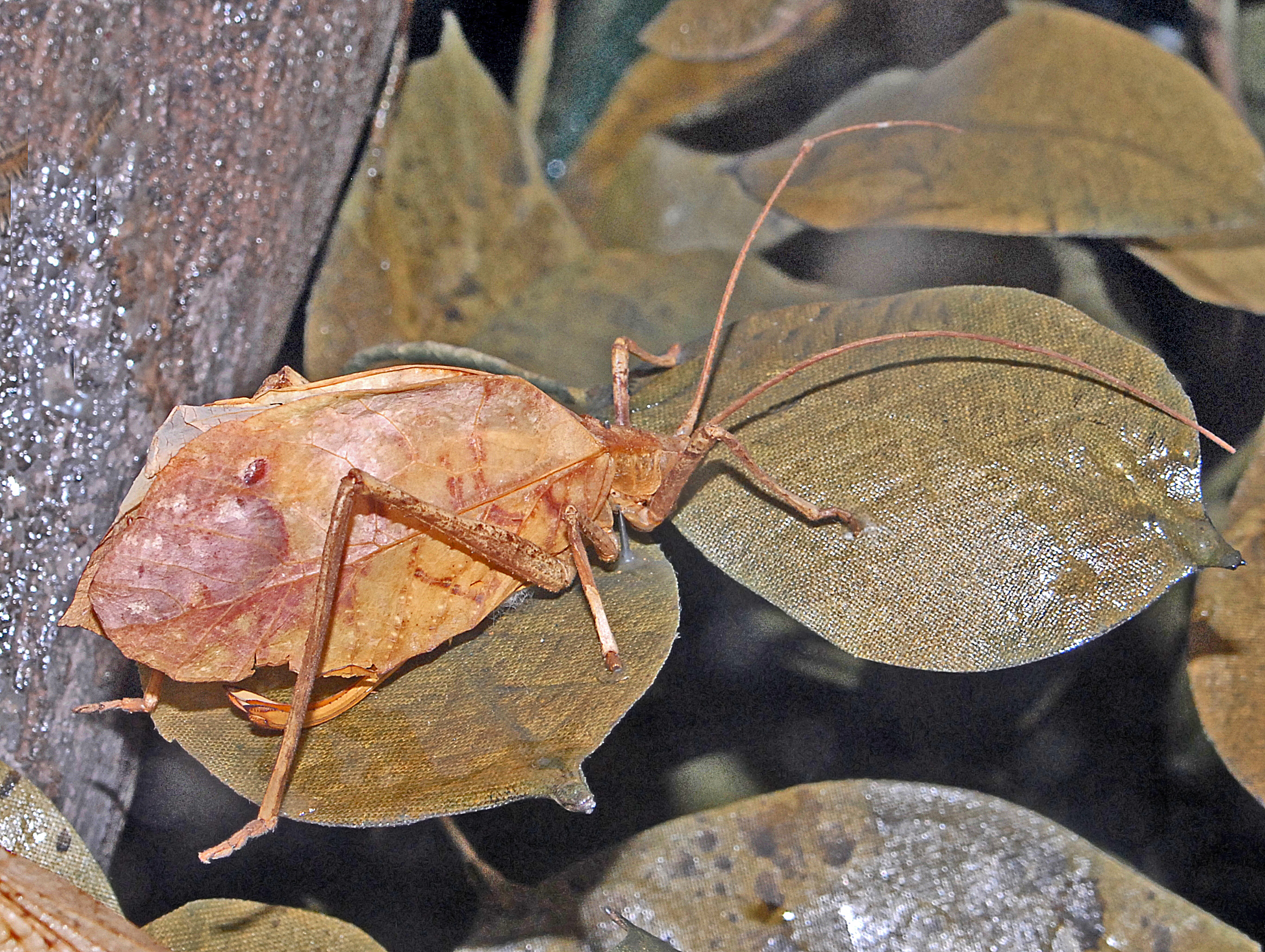
- Unknown Typophyllum species
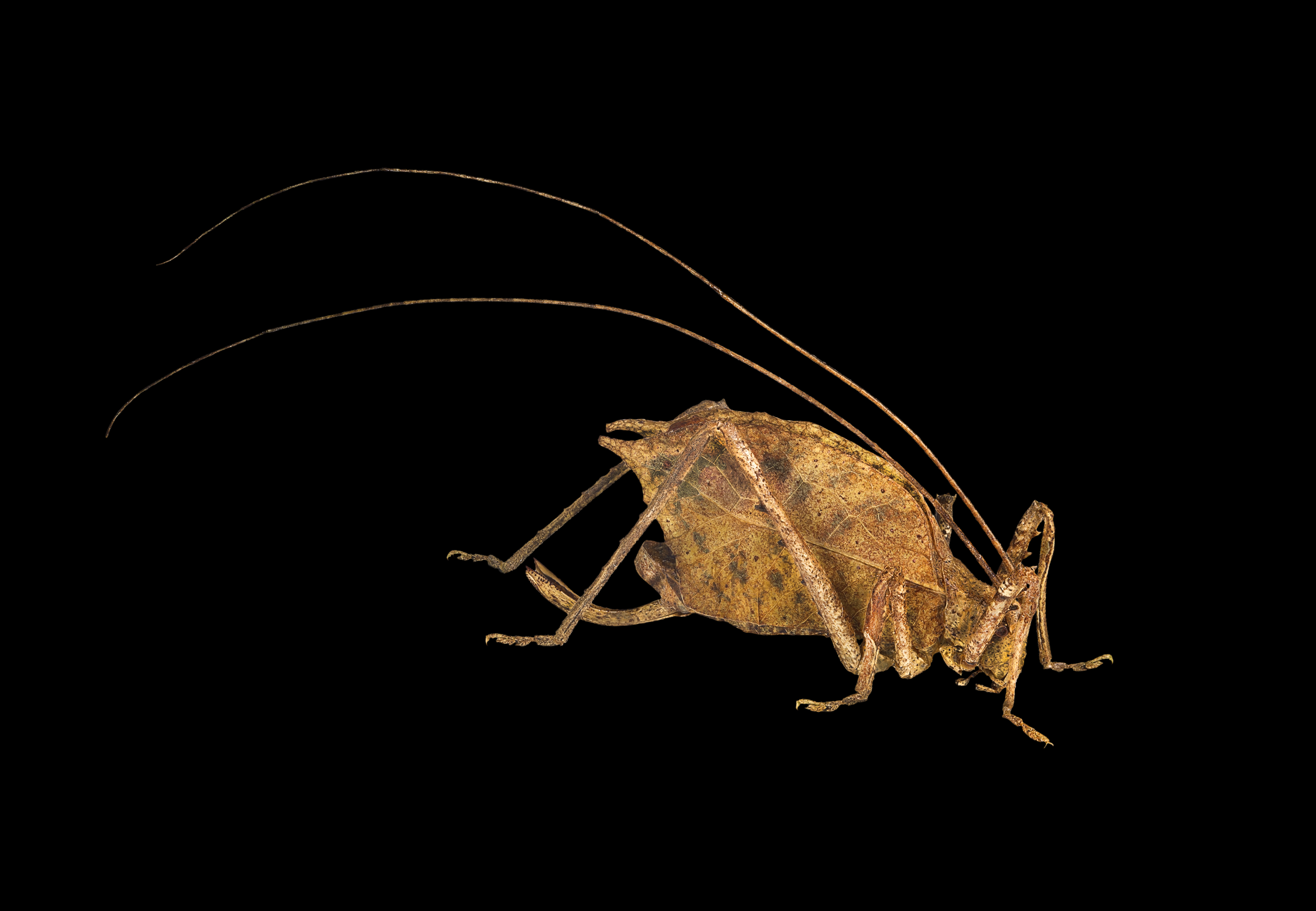
- Porphyromma speciosa

Scientific classification
- Kingdom: Animalia
- Phylum: Arthropoda
- Class: Insecta
- Order: Orthoptera
- Suborder: Ensifera
- Superfamily: Tettigonioidea
- Family: Tettigoniidae
- Subfamily: Pterochrozinae; Walker, 1871

= Pterochrozinae =

Subfamily of cricket-like animals

The Pterochrozinae are a subfamily of the Tettigoniidae found in Central and South America. They were previously placed as a tribe in the subfamily Pseudophyllinae and have been called "leaf-mimic katydids".

== Genera ==
As of 2018, Orthoptera Species File lists the following:

- Anommatoptera Vignon, 1923
- Asbolomma Beier, 1962
- Celidophylla Saussure & Pictet, 1898
- Cycloptera Serville, 1838
- Mimetica Pictet, 1888
- Ommatoptera Pictet, 1888
- Paracycloptera Vignon, 1926
- Porphyromma Redtenbacher, 1895
- Pterochroza Serville, 1831
- Rhodopteryx Pictet, 1888
- Roxelana Kirby, 1906
- Tanusia Stål, 1874
- Tanusiella Enderlein, 1917
- Typophyllum Serville, 1838
