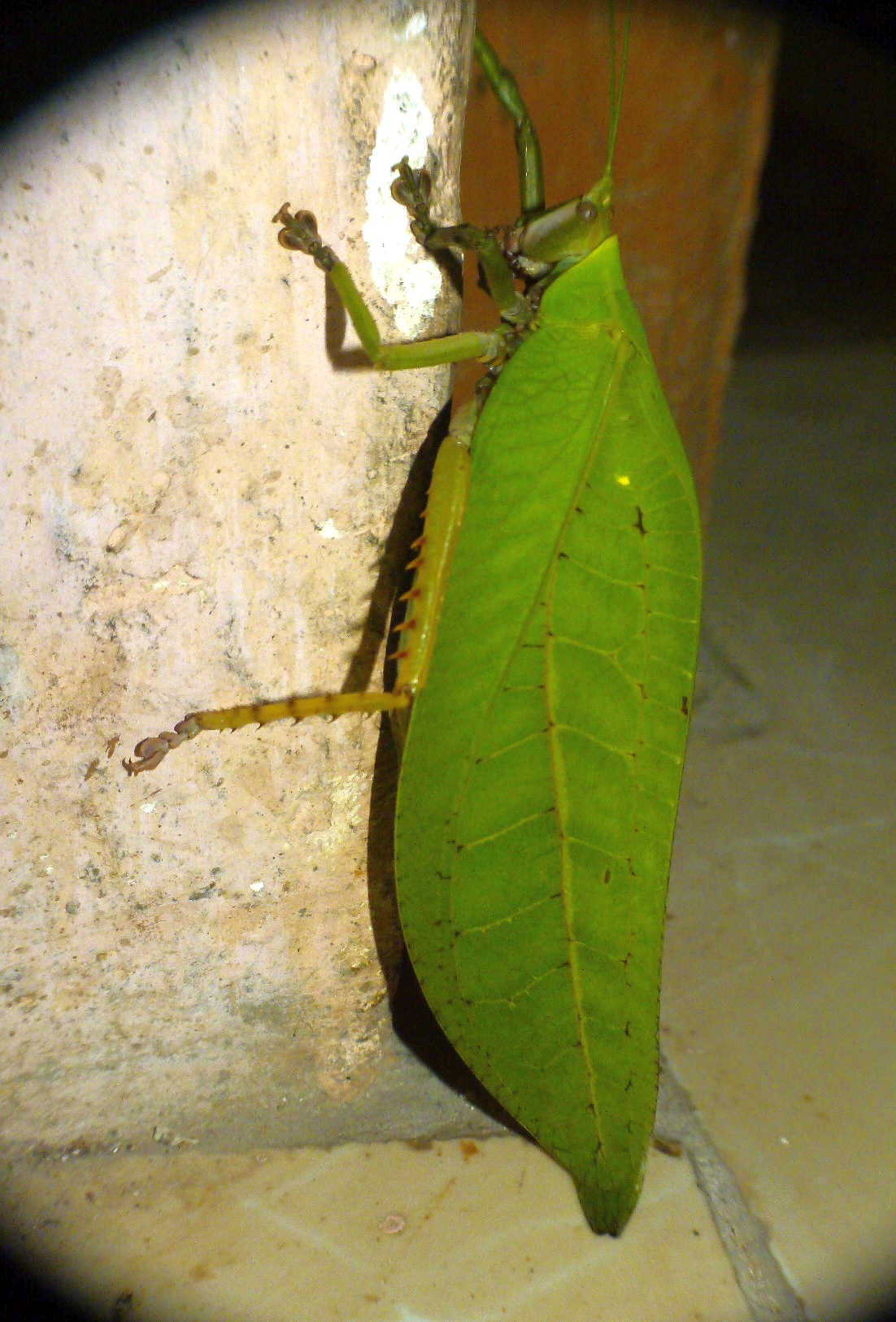
- Onomarchus uninotatus from the Western Ghats of India

Scientific classification
- Kingdom: Animalia
- Phylum: Arthropoda
- Class: Insecta
- Order: Orthoptera
- Suborder: Ensifera
- Family: Tettigoniidae
- Subfamily: Pseudophyllinae
- Tribe: Pseudophyllini
- Genus: Onomarchus; Stål, 1874

Synonyms
- Astralia Kirby, 1906; Onomarchis Hebard, 1922; Onomarcus Pictet & Saussure, 1892

= Onomarchus (katydid) =

Genus of cricket-like animals

Onomarchus is a genus of bush crickets or katydids found mainly distributed in the tropical forests of Asia. Like many other members of the subfamily Pseudophyllinae, their wings appear very leaf-like.

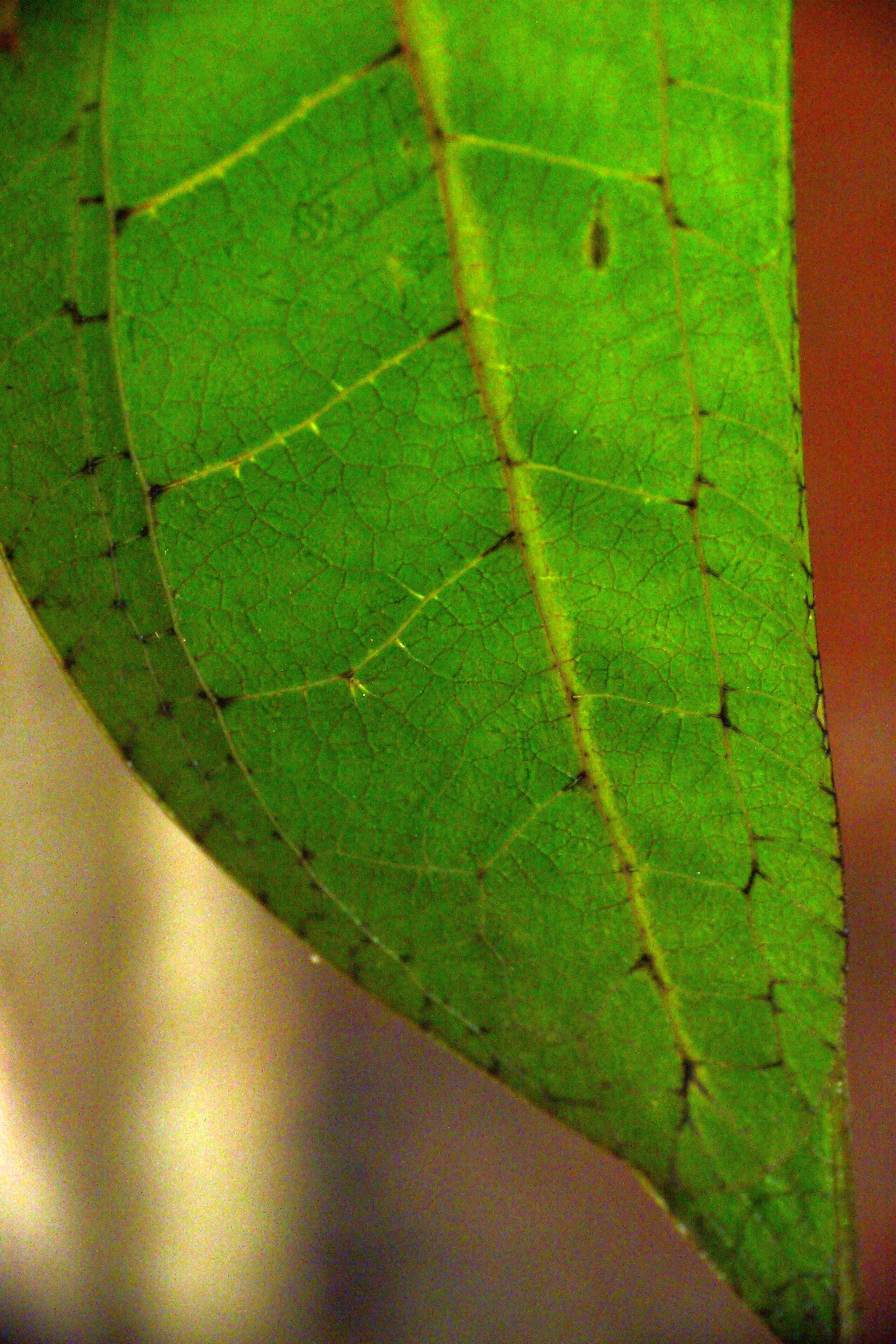
Detail of wing of O. uninotatus

A study of O. uninotatus found it to produce sounds at an unusually low frequency of about 3.5 kHz. The tympanal membrane cuts out high frequencies unlike the sound filters found in other Tettigoniids.

== Species ==
The species in the genus include

- Onomarchus bisulcatus Ingrisch & Shishodia, 1998
- Onomarchus cretaceus (Serville, 1838)
- Onomarchus leuconotus (Serville, 1838) - type species (locality Java)
- Onomarchus philippinensis Weidner, 1965
- Onomarchus uninotatus (Serville, 1838)
