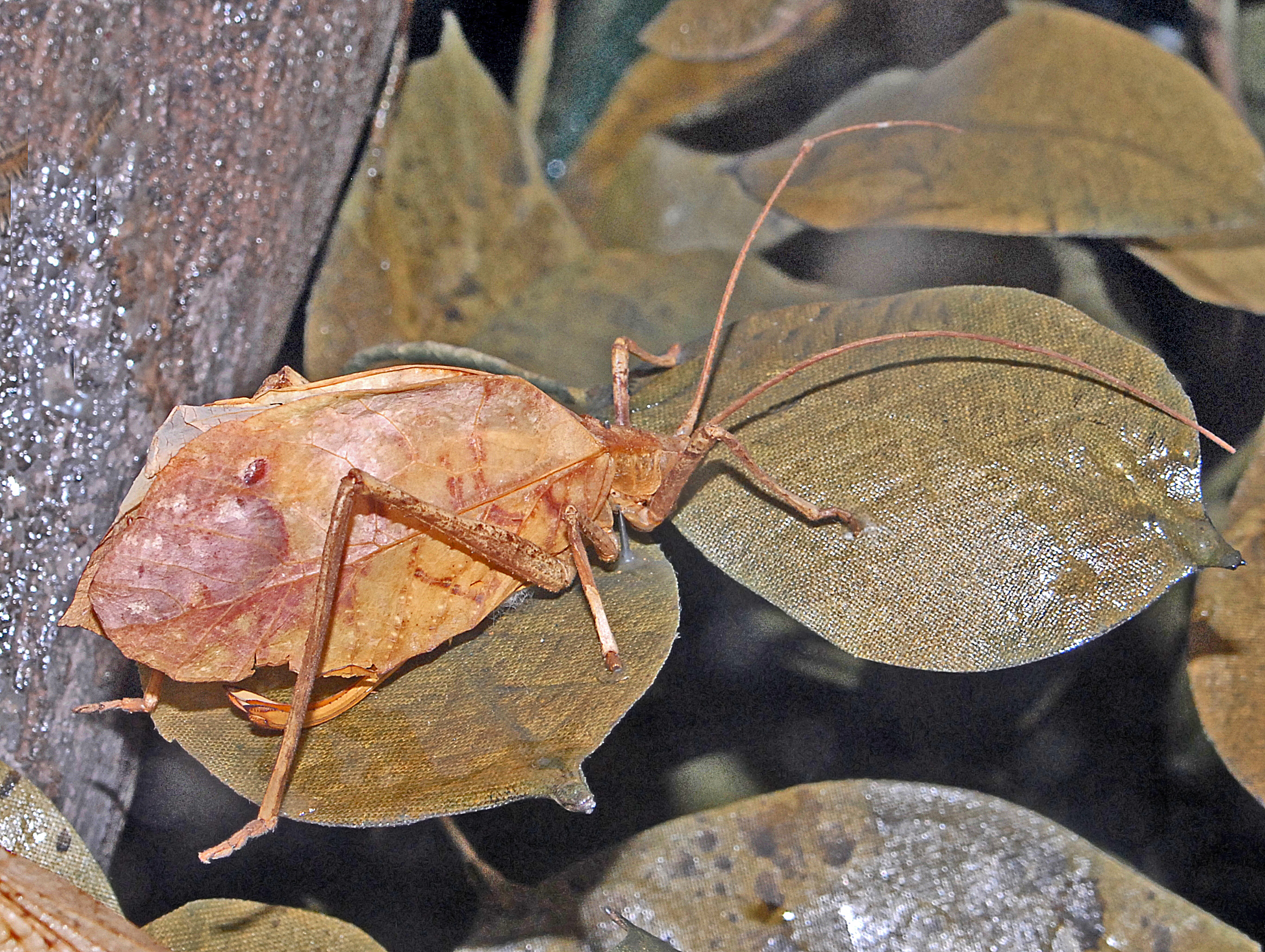
- Typophyllum species

Scientific classification
- Domain: Eukaryota
- Kingdom: Animalia
- Phylum: Arthropoda
- Class: Insecta
- Order: Orthoptera
- Suborder: Ensifera
- Family: Tettigoniidae
- Subfamily: Pterochrozinae
- Genus: Typophyllum; Serville, 1838

= Typophyllum =

Genus of cricket-like animals

Typophyllum is a genus of Neotropical, leaf-mimicking katydids or bush crickets belonging to the subfamily Pterochrozinae.

== Species ==
- Typophyllum abruptum Brunner von Wattenwyl, 1895
- Typophyllum acutum Vignon, 1925
- Typophyllum bolivari Vignon, 1925
- Typophyllum chlorophyllum Bolívar, 1890
- Typophyllum cinnamum Bolívar, 1890
- Typophyllum columbicum Brunner von Wattenwyl, 1895
- Typophyllum contractum Brunner von Wattenwyl, 1895
- Typophyllum curtum Vignon, 1926
- Typophyllum eeckei Vignon, 1926
- Typophyllum egregium Hebard, 1924
- Typophyllum erosifolium Walker, 1870
- Typophyllum erosum Stoll, 1787
- Typophyllum flavifolium Saussure & Pictet, 1898
- Typophyllum geminum Bolívar, 1890
- Typophyllum gibbosum Vignon, 1925
- Typophyllum helleri Brunner von Wattenwyl, 1895
- Typophyllum histrio Brunner von Wattenwyl, 1895
- Typophyllum inflatum Vignon, 1925
- Typophyllum laciniosum Vignon, 1927
- Typophyllum lacinipenne Enderlein, 1917
- Typophyllum lunatum Pictet, 1888
- Typophyllum modestum Piza, 1976
- Typophyllum mortuifolium Walker, 1870
- Typophyllum mutilatum Walker, 1870
- Typophyllum pererosum Hebard, 1933
- Typophyllum peruvianum Pictet, 1888
- Typophyllum praeruptum Vignon, 1926
- Typophyllum pseudocinnamum Vignon, 1926
- Typophyllum quadriincisum Vignon, 1925
- Typophyllum rufifolium Chopard, 1919
- Typophyllum scissifolium Walker, 1870
- Typophyllum siccifolium Bolívar, 1890
- Typophyllum spurioculis Baker, Sarria-S., Morris, Jonsson & Montealegre-Z., 2017
- Typophyllum trapeziforme Stoll, 1787
- Typophyllum trigonum Vignon, 1925
- Typophyllum truncatifolium Walker, 1870
- Typophyllum undulatum Caudell, 1918
- Typophyllum zingara Montealegre-Z. & Morris, 1999

== Gallery ==
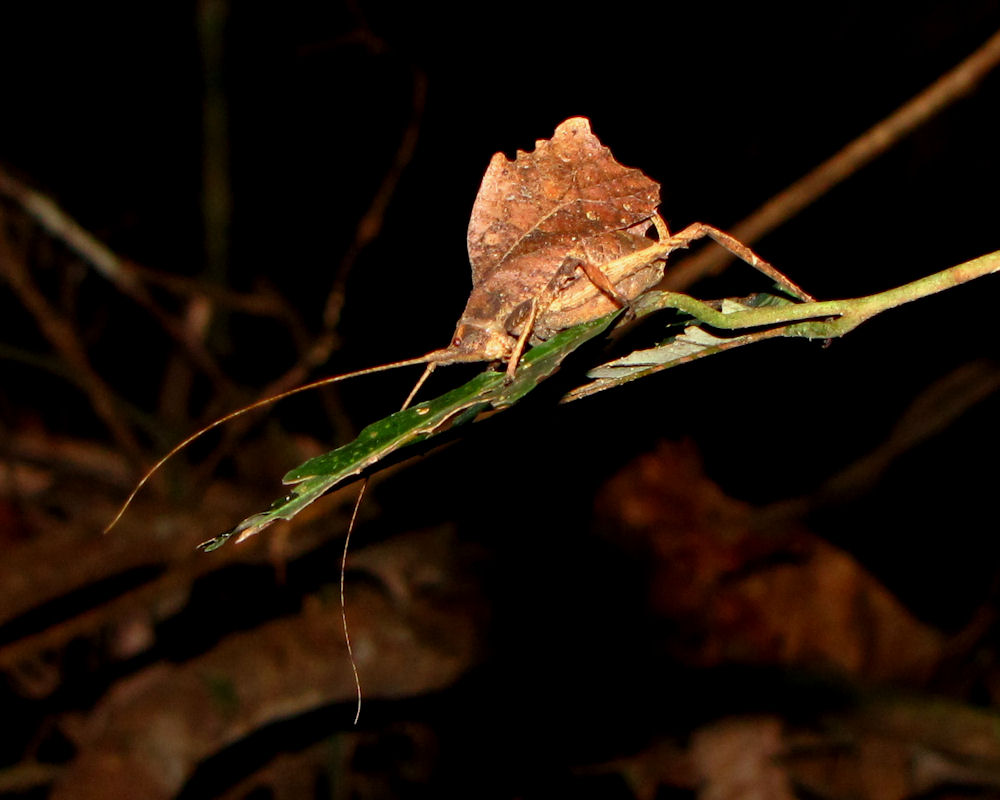
Typophyllum laciniosum

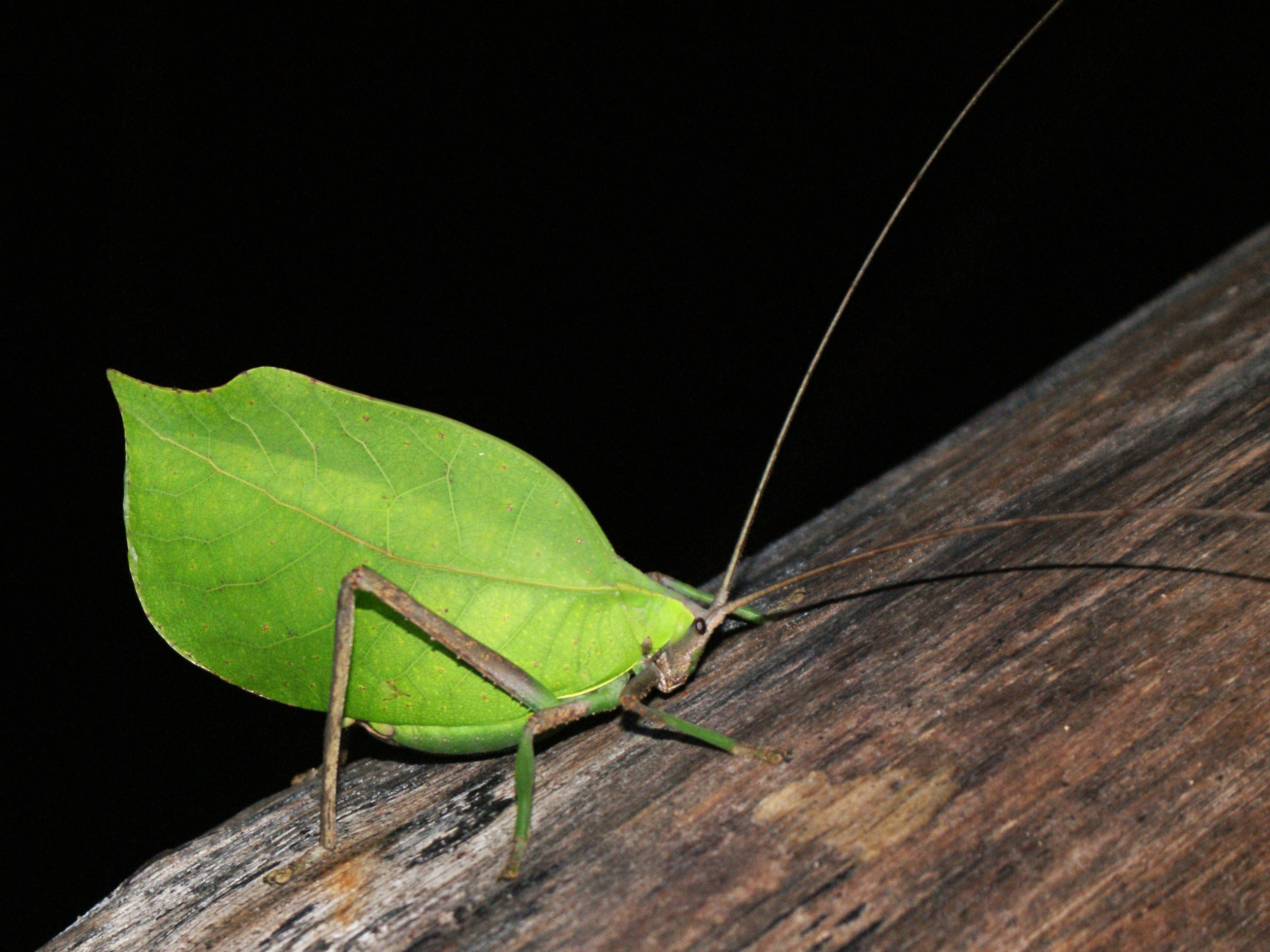
Typophyllum erosum
