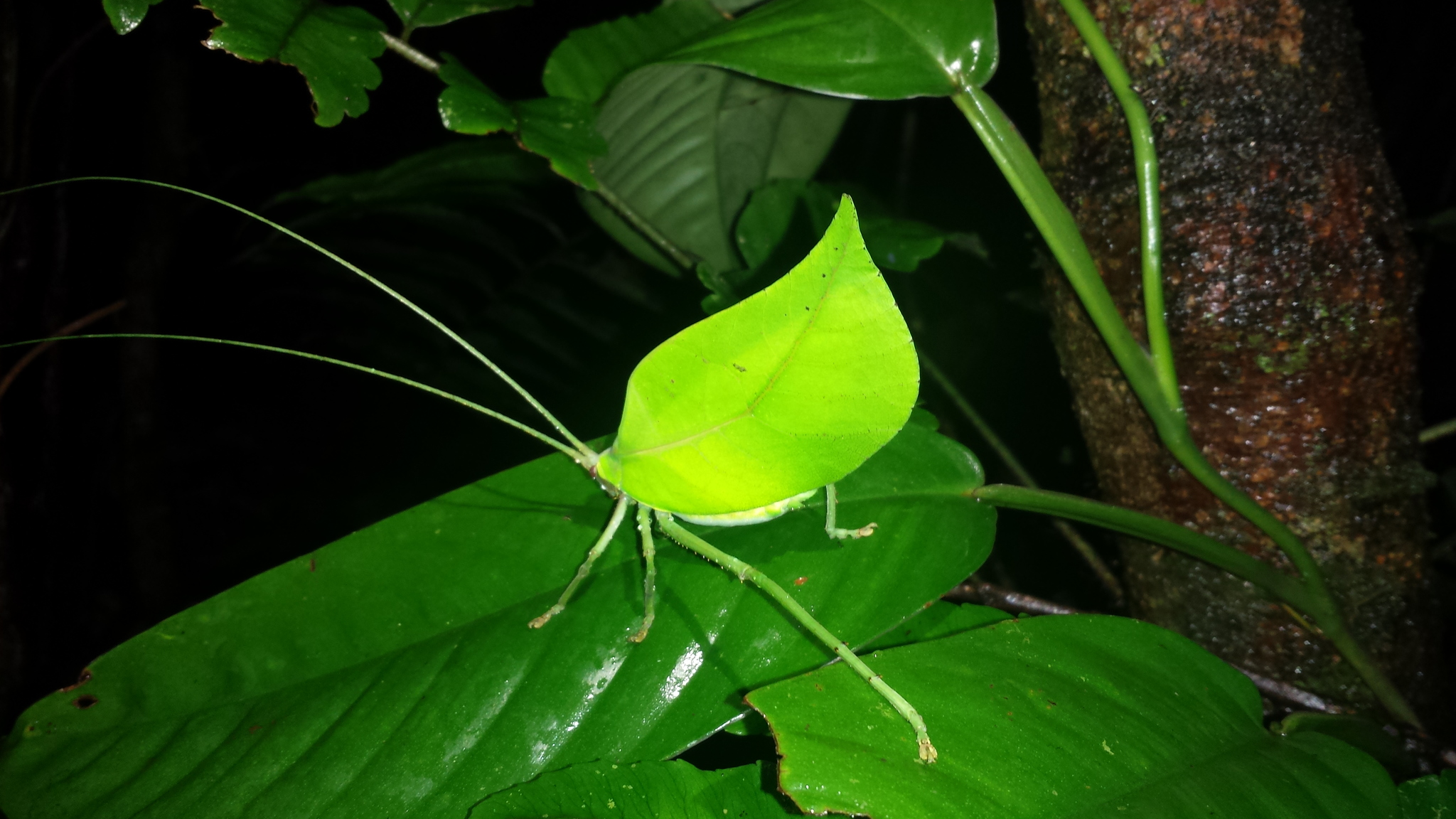
- Cycloptera arcuata

Scientific classification
- Domain: Eukaryota
- Kingdom: Animalia
- Phylum: Arthropoda
- Class: Insecta
- Order: Orthoptera
- Suborder: Ensifera
- Superfamily: Tettigonioidea
- Family: Tettigoniidae
- Subfamily: Pterochrozinae
- Genus: Cycloptera; Serville, 1838

Synonyms
- Chlorophylla Pictet, 1888

= Cycloptera =

Genus of cricket-like animals

Cycloptera is a South American genus of bush crickets in the subfamily Pterochrozinae.

== Species ==
As of 2018, Orthoptera Species File lists:

- Cycloptera arcuata (Saussure & Pictet, 1898)
- Cycloptera aurantifolia (Stoll, 1787) - type species
- Cycloptera excellens Vignon, 1926
- Cycloptera falcifolia Walker, 1870
- Cycloptera speculata (Burmeister, 1838)
