= Leaf-mimic katydid =

Common name for several species of cricket-like animal

There are many insects in the family Tettigoniidae (bush crickets or katydids) which are mimics of leaves. At a distance the katydid is an example of crypsis evading detection by blending into its background; up close the katydid mimics a leaf.

This type of camouflage occurs in several subfamilies, among others including:

- Pterochrozinae
- Phaneropterinae
- Pseudophyllinae

Other unrelated insects adopting a similar camouflage strategy include the leaf insects.

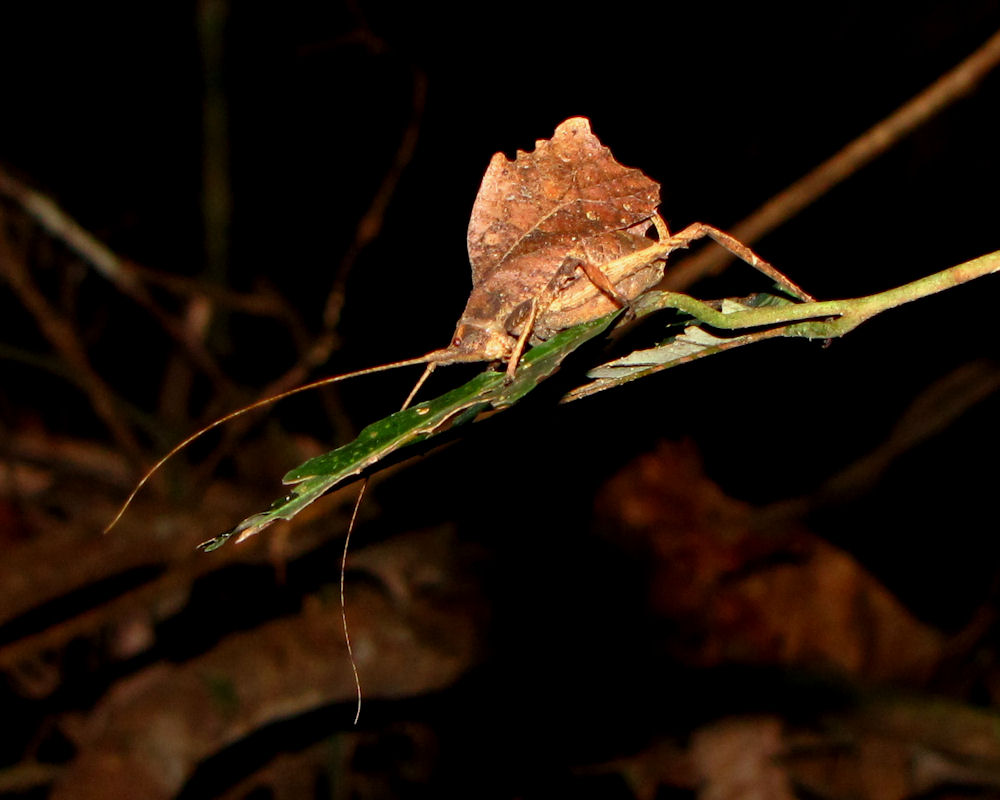
Typophyllum laciniosum, Tambopata File:National Reserve, Peru

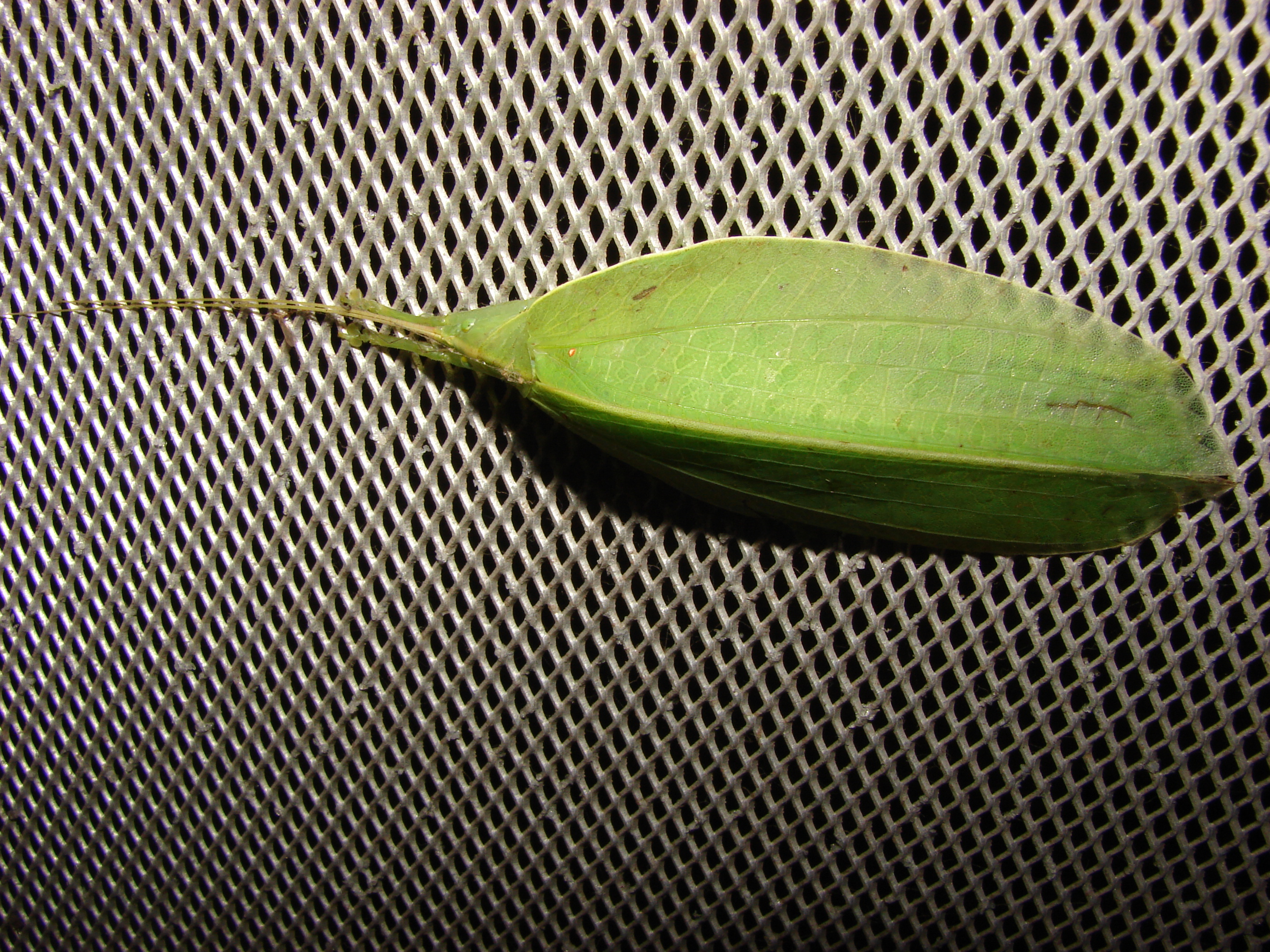
Aegimia elongata

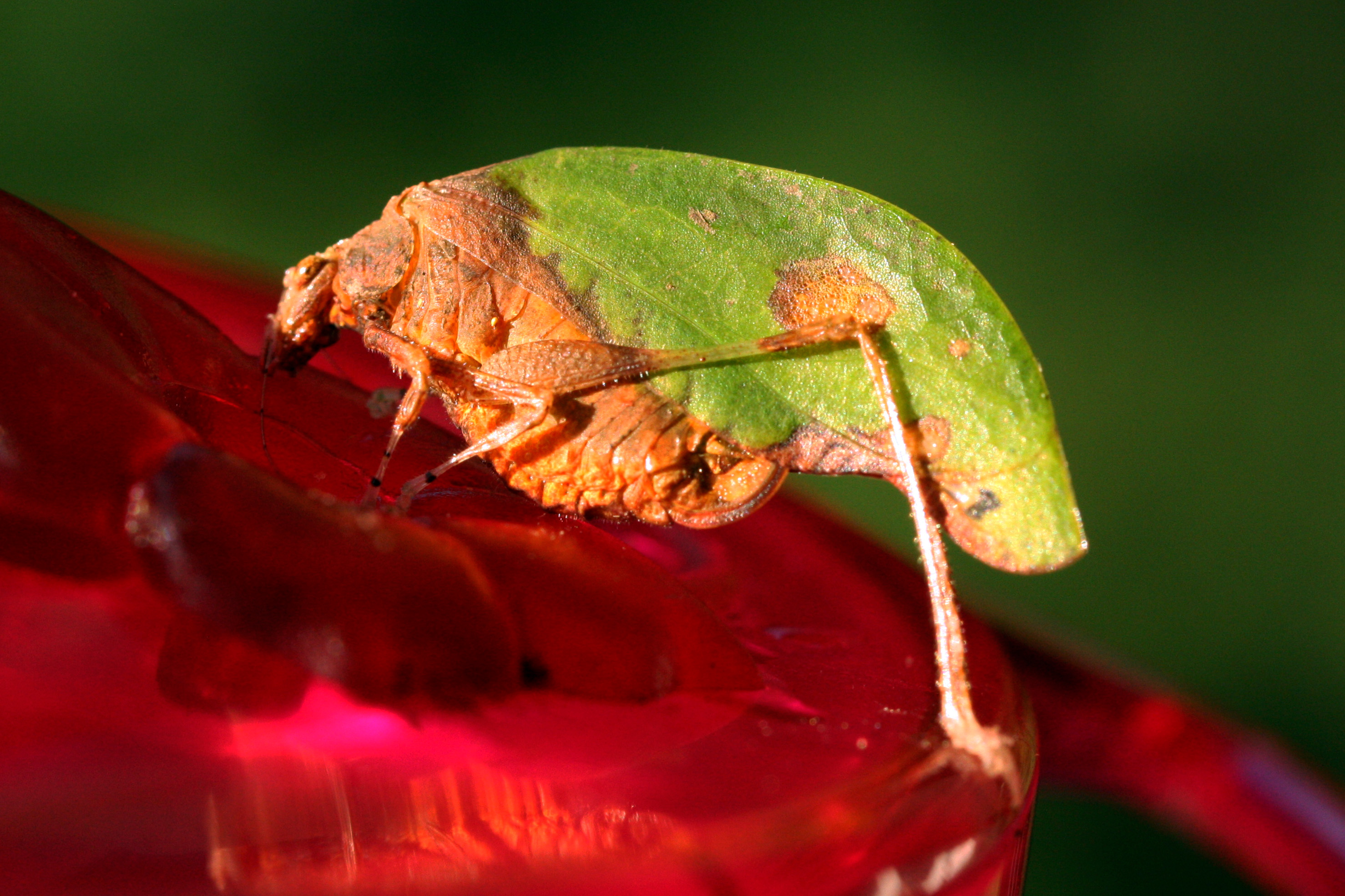
Pycnopalpa bicordata, Trinidad

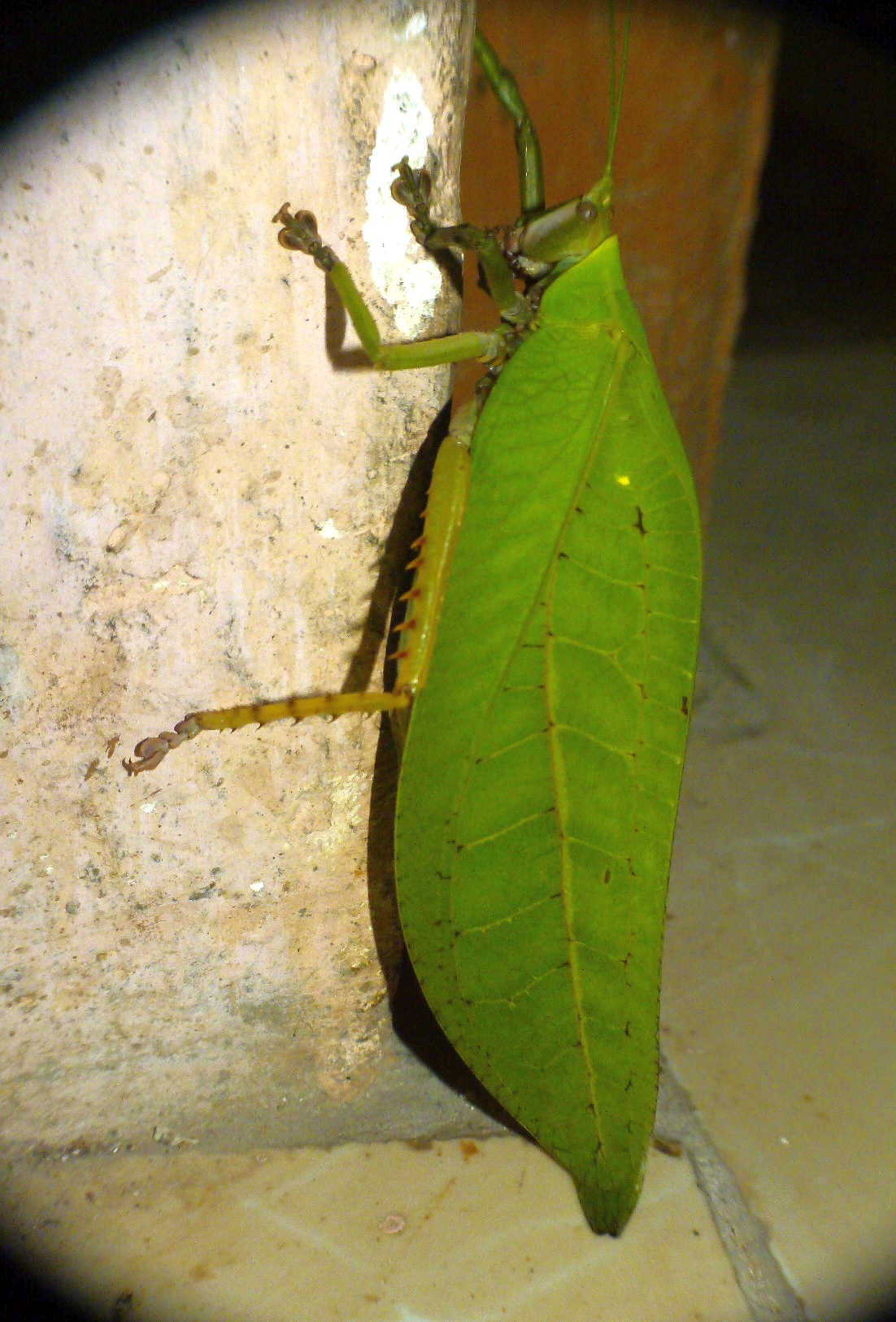
Onomarchus kanara
