= Pterophylla =

Pterophylla is the scientific name of two genera of organisms and may refer to:

- Pterophylla (katydid), a genus of katydids in the family Tettigoniidae
- Pterophylla (plant), a genus of plants in the family Cunoniaceae
