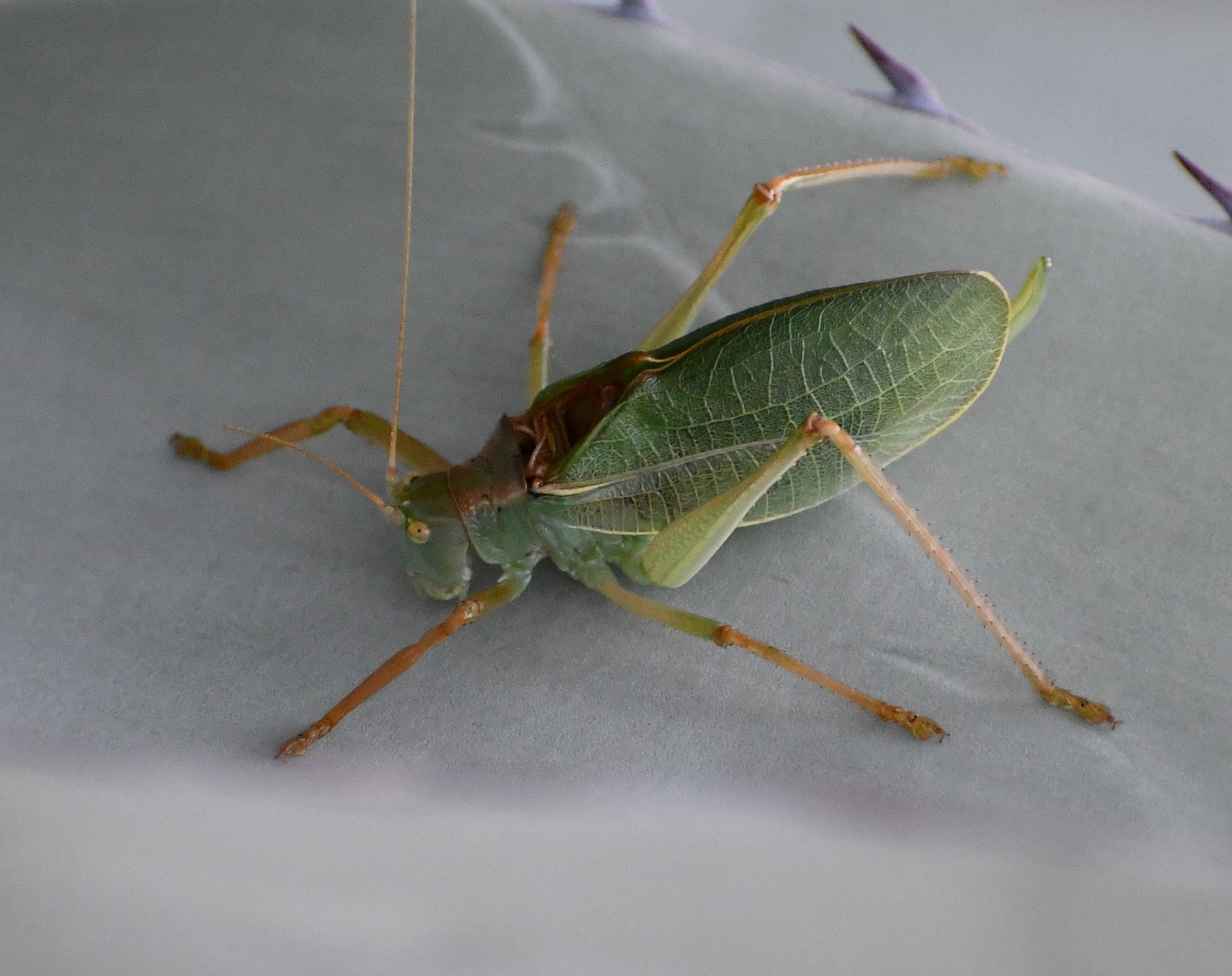

Scientific classification
- Domain: Eukaryota
- Kingdom: Animalia
- Phylum: Arthropoda
- Class: Insecta
- Order: Orthoptera
- Suborder: Ensifera
- Family: Tettigoniidae
- Subfamily: Pseudophyllinae
- Supertribe: Pleminiiti
- Tribe: Pterophyllini
- Genus: Paracyrtophyllus
- Species: P. excelsus

Binomial name
- Paracyrtophyllus excelsus (Rehn & Hebard, 1914)

= Paracyrtophyllus excelsus =

Species of cricket-like animal

Paracyrtophyllus excelsus, known generally as the chisos katydid or big bend quonker, is a species of true katydid in the family Tettigoniidae. It is found in North America.
