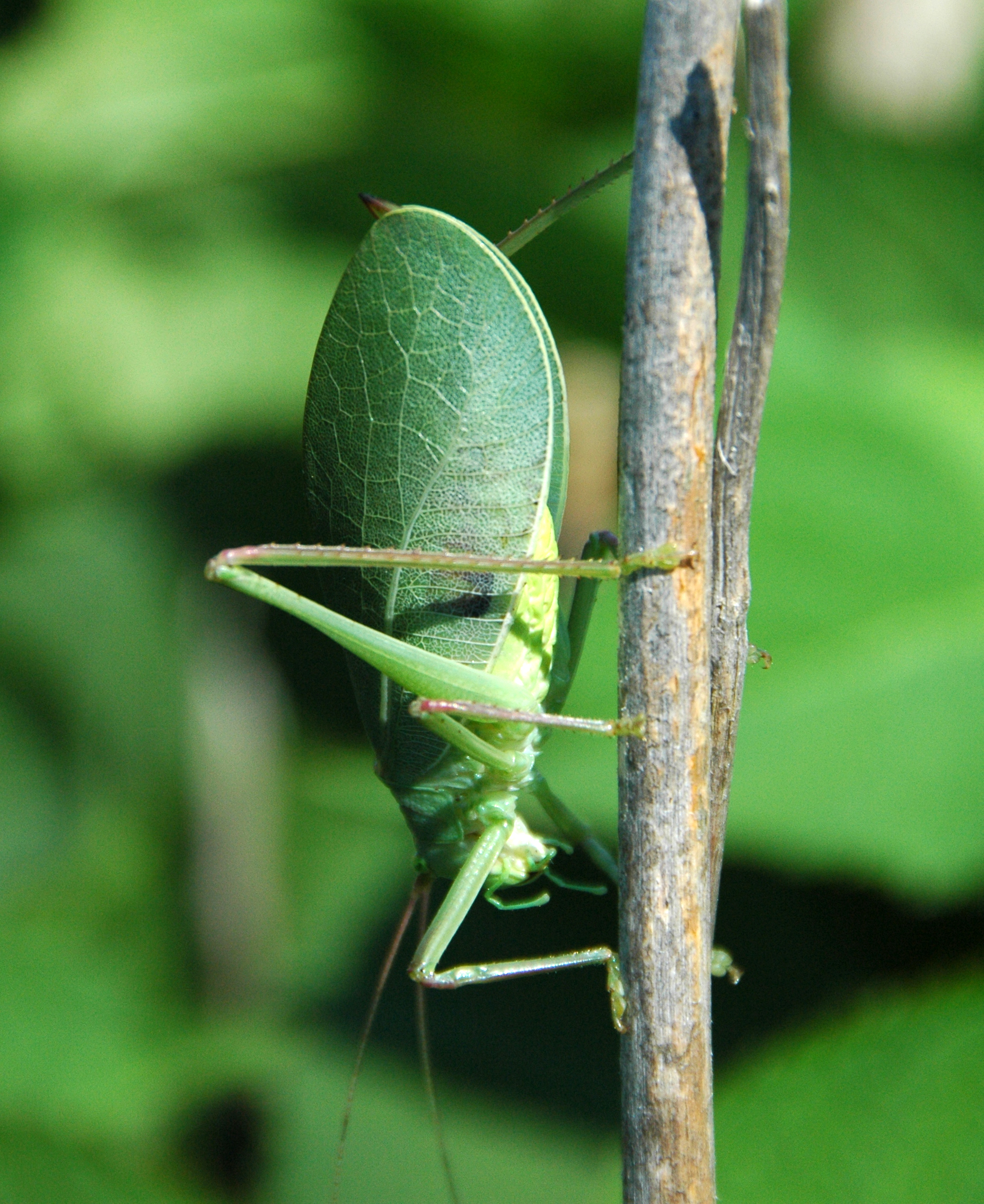
- Pterophylla camellifolia

Scientific classification
- Kingdom: Animalia
- Phylum: Arthropoda
- Clade: Pancrustacea
- Class: Insecta
- Order: Orthoptera
- Suborder: Ensifera
- Family: Tettigoniidae
- Subfamily: Pseudophyllinae
- Supertribe: Pleminiiti
- Tribe: Pterophyllini
- Genus: Pterophylla; Kirby, 1825

= Pterophylla (katydid) =

Genus of cricket-like animals

Pterophylla is a genus of true katydids in the family Tettigoniidae from the North America. There are about five described species in Pterophylla.

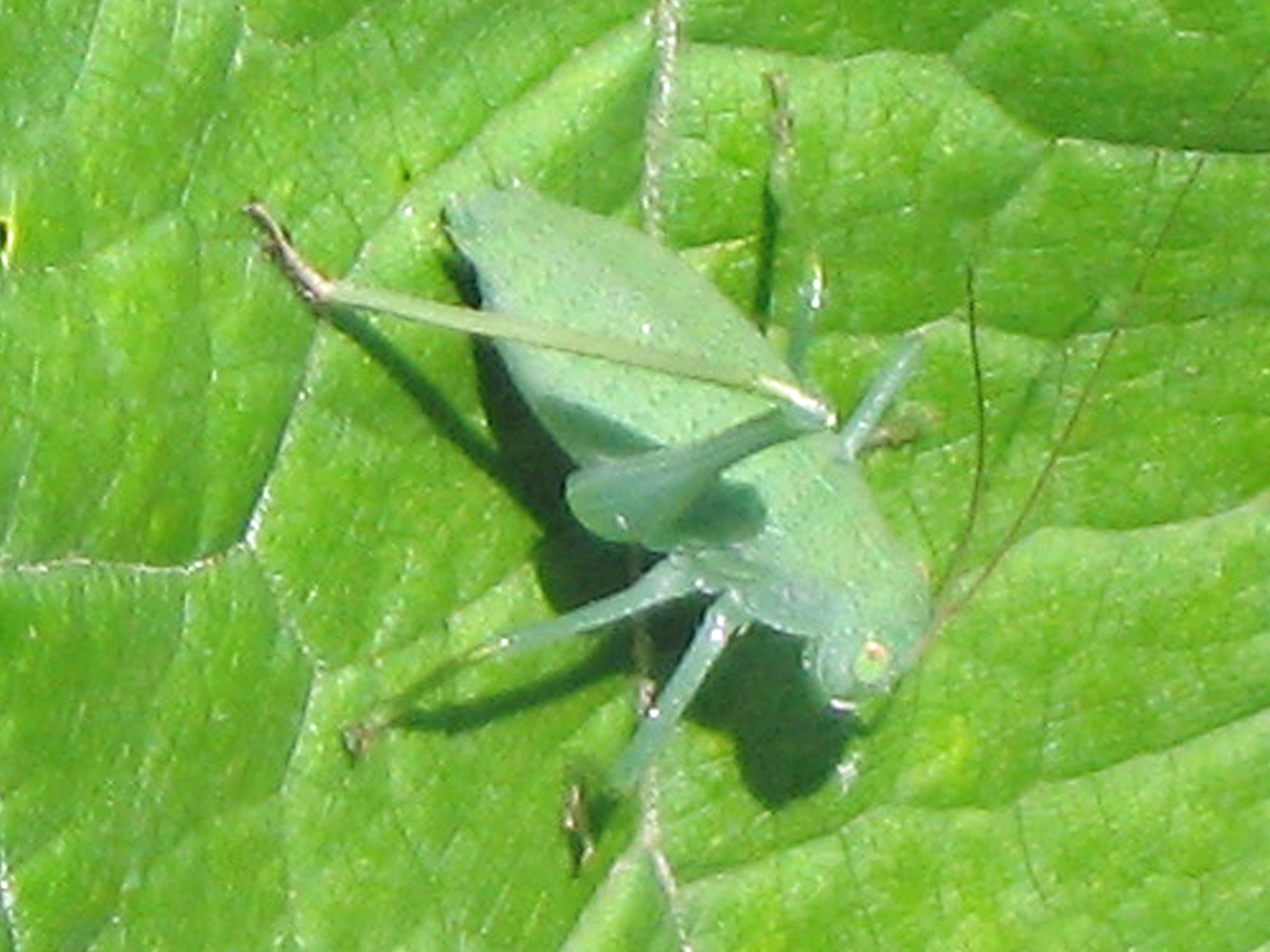
Pterophylla camellifolia

Within the Pseudophyllinae, Pterophylla belongs to the tribe Pterophyllini. Among others, this tribe includes the Florida true katydid Lea floridensis, as well as the two Southwestern true katydid species in the genus Paracyrtophyllus.

== Species ==
The genus Pterophylla comprises five species, three of which were discovered in Mexico. Pterophylla camellifolia and Pterophylla furcata are found in the central United States. The following species are included:

subgenus Balsasia Bolívar & Bolívar, 1942

1. Pterophylla baezi Bolívar & Bolívar, 1942

subgenus Pterophylla Kirby, 1825

1. Pterophylla beltrani Bolívar & Bolívar, 1942
2. Pterophylla camellifolia (Fabricius, 1775) (common true katydid)
3. Pterophylla furcata Caudell, 1906
4. Pterophylla robertsi Hebard, 1941
