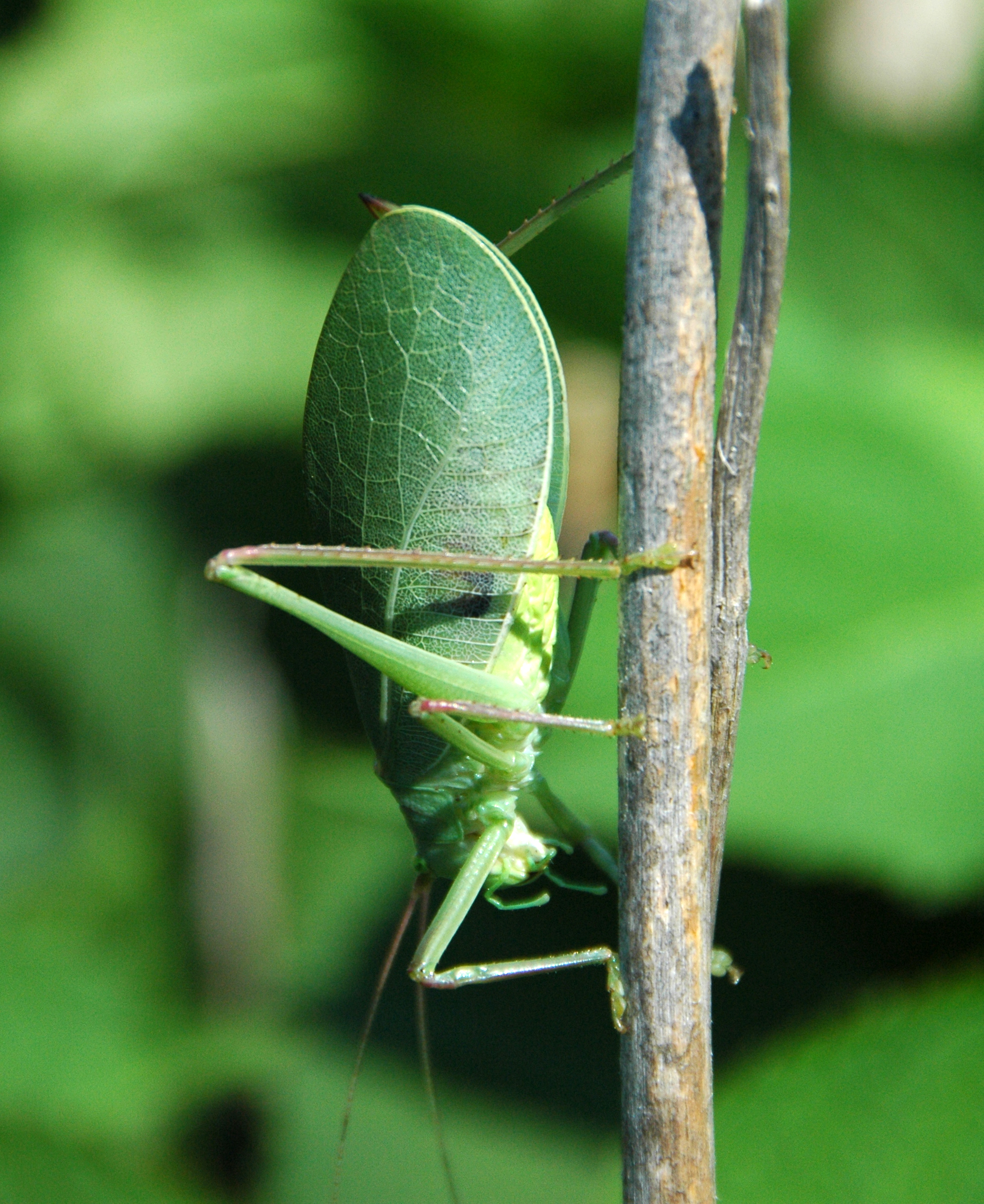
- Female, Kentucky

Scientific classification
- Kingdom: Animalia
- Phylum: Arthropoda
- Class: Insecta
- Order: Orthoptera
- Suborder: Ensifera
- Family: Tettigoniidae
- Subfamily: Pseudophyllinae
- Genus: Pterophylla
- Species: P. camellifolia

Binomial name
- Pterophylla camellifolia (Fabricius, 1775)

= Pterophylla camellifolia =

Species of katydid

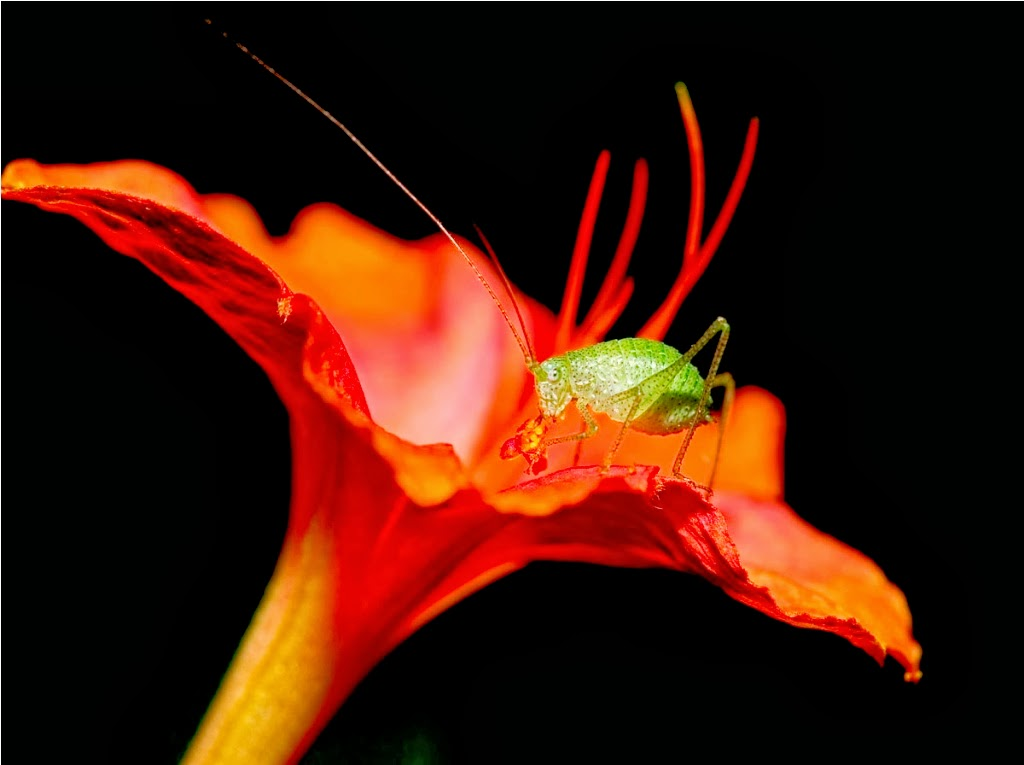
Common true katydid nymph on a Mirabilis jalapa flower

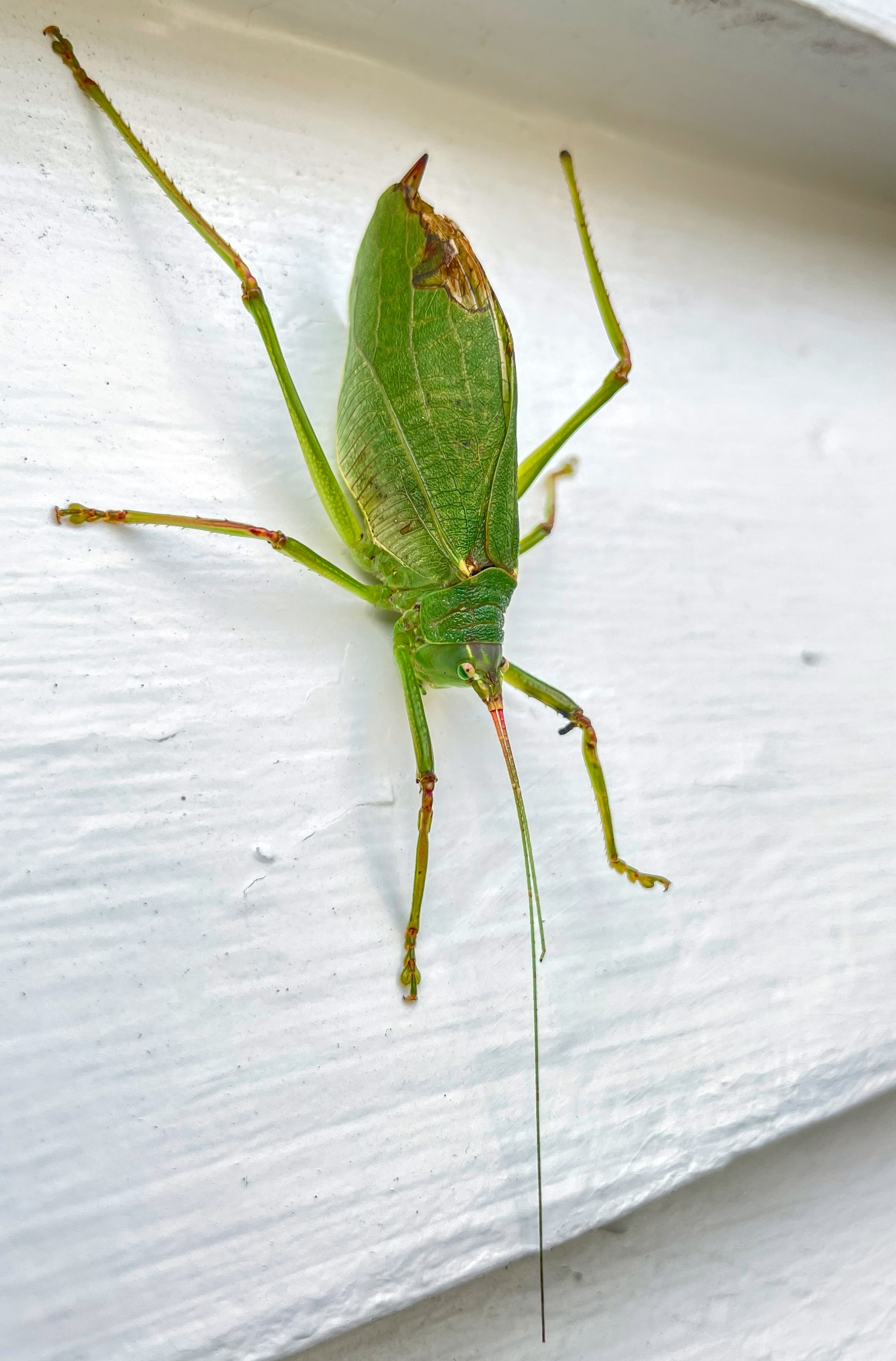
Female P. camellifolia on house in Massachusetts

Pterophylla camellifolia, the common true katydid, is a common North American insect. It can be found in southeastern Canada, through the eastern United States from Maine to Florida. P. camellifolia belongs to the family Tettigoniidae (katydids). Within the Tettigoniidae, it belongs to the subfamily Pseudophyllinae (true katydids). Other common names include northern true katydid and rough-winged katydid.

The loud, rasping, three-pulsed song, rendered "ka-ty-did", of the male of the nominate northern subspecies is the source of the vernacular name "katydid” as applied to any tettigoniid. It is a nearly flightless species that, in contrast with other katydids, often walks, runs, or hops rather than leaping or flying. It lives in the canopy of deciduous trees, where it feeds on the foliage. It can reach up to 50 mm (2 in) in length.

== Song ==
The singing rate is temperature dependent. Four populations of this species can be distinguished by song characteristics:

- The two-, three-, or four-pulsed song of northern populations, as described above;
- The faster song with more pulses per phrase, often heard in large, synchronized choruses common to the Southeastern populations;
- The one- or two-pulsed song of Southwestern populations; and
- A song of 8 to 15 pulses heard only in central Iowa.
Song at 20 °C, Illinois

== Taxonomy ==
This species' original scientific name was Locusta camellifolia. The genus Pterophylla was created for it by Kirby in 1825. Three subspecies are recognized for P. camellifolia:

- Pterophylla camellifolia camellifolia (Fabricius, 1775) – type locality is in the United States
- Pterophylla camellifolia dentifera (Hebard, 1941) – type locality is Hempstead County, Arkansas, United States
- Pterophylla camellifolia intermedia (Caudell, 1906) – type locality is Biloxi, Mississippi, United States
