= Pterophyllini =

Scientific classification
- Kingdom: Animalia
- Phylum: Arthropoda
- Clade: Pancrustacea
- Class: Insecta
- Order: Orthoptera
- Suborder: Ensifera
- Family: Tettigoniidae
- Subfamily: Pseudophyllinae
- Supertribe: Pleminiiti
- Tribe: Pterophyllini; Karny, 1925

Tribe of cricket-like animals

Pterophyllini is a tribe of true katydids in the family Tettigoniidae from the Americas. There are more than 40 described species in Pterophyllini.

== Genera ==
These 16 genera belong to the tribe Pterophyllini:

- Caloxiphus Saussure & Pictet, 1898
- Caribophyllum Rehn, 1947
- Diophanes Stål, 1875
- Elytraspis Beier, 1962
- Karukerana Bonfils, 1965
- Lea Caudell, 1906
- Lophaspis Redtenbacher, 1895
- Mastophyllum Beier, 1960
- Paracyrtophyllus Caudell, 1906 (western true katydids)
- Parascopioricus Beier, 1960
- Phyllopectis Rehn, 1948
- Pterophylla Kirby, 1825
- Scopioricus Uvarov, 1940
- Scopiorinus Beier, 1960
- Thliboscelus Serville, 1838
- Xestoptera Redtenbacher, 1895
