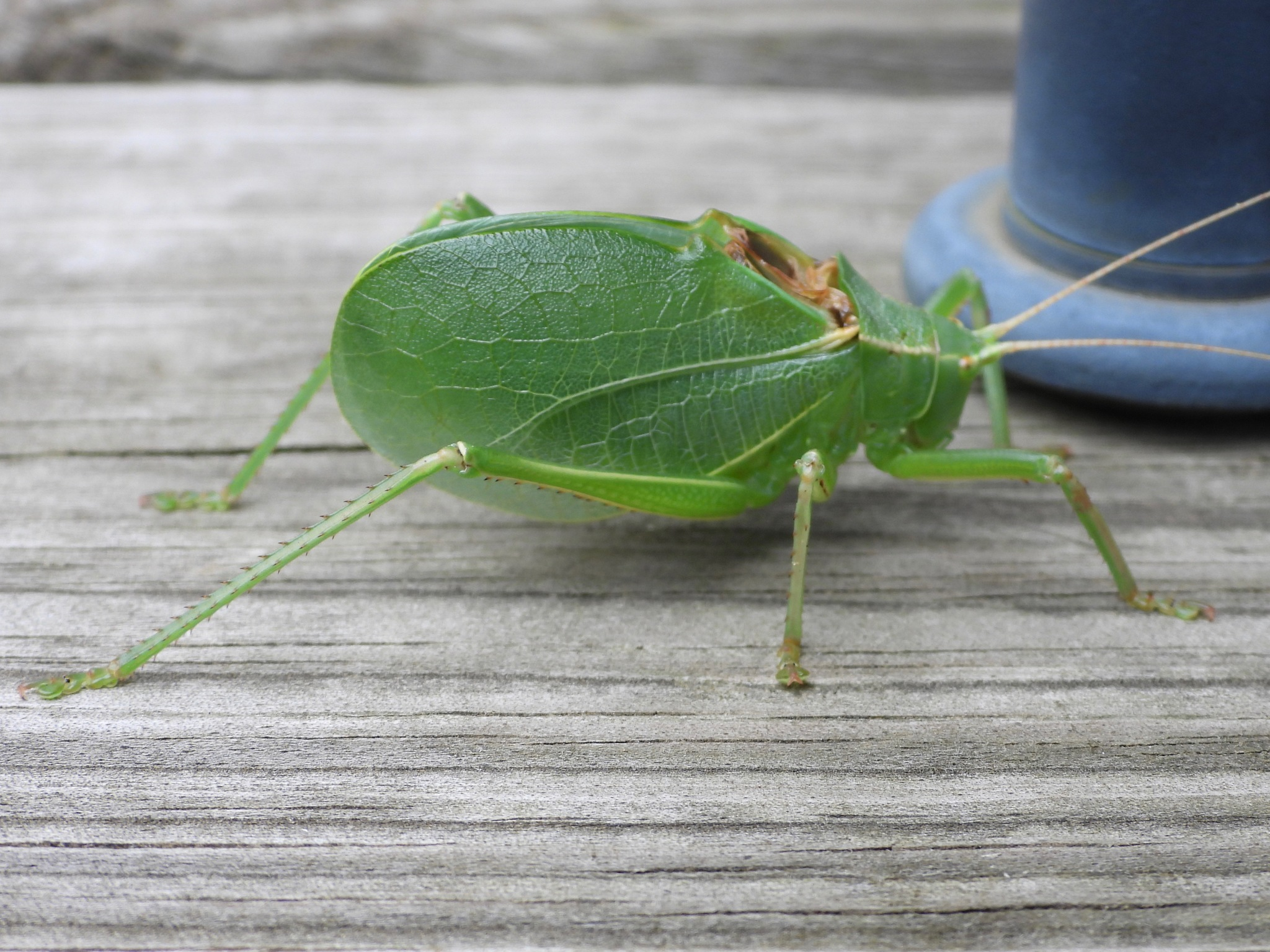
- Paracyrtophyllus robustus

Scientific classification
- Kingdom: Animalia
- Phylum: Arthropoda
- Clade: Pancrustacea
- Class: Insecta
- Order: Orthoptera
- Suborder: Ensifera
- Family: Tettigoniidae
- Subfamily: Pseudophyllinae
- Supertribe: Pleminiiti
- Tribe: Pterophyllini
- Genus: Paracyrtophyllus; Caudell, 1906

= Paracyrtophyllus =

Genus of cricket-like animals

Paracyrtophyllus is a genus of western true katydids in the family Tettigoniidae, from North America. There are at least two described species in the genus Paracyrtophyllus.

== Species ==
These two species belong to the genus Paracyrtophyllus:

- Paracyrtophyllus excelsus (Rehn & Hebard, 1914) (chisos katydid)
- Paracyrtophyllus robustus Caudell, 1906 (truncated true katydid)
