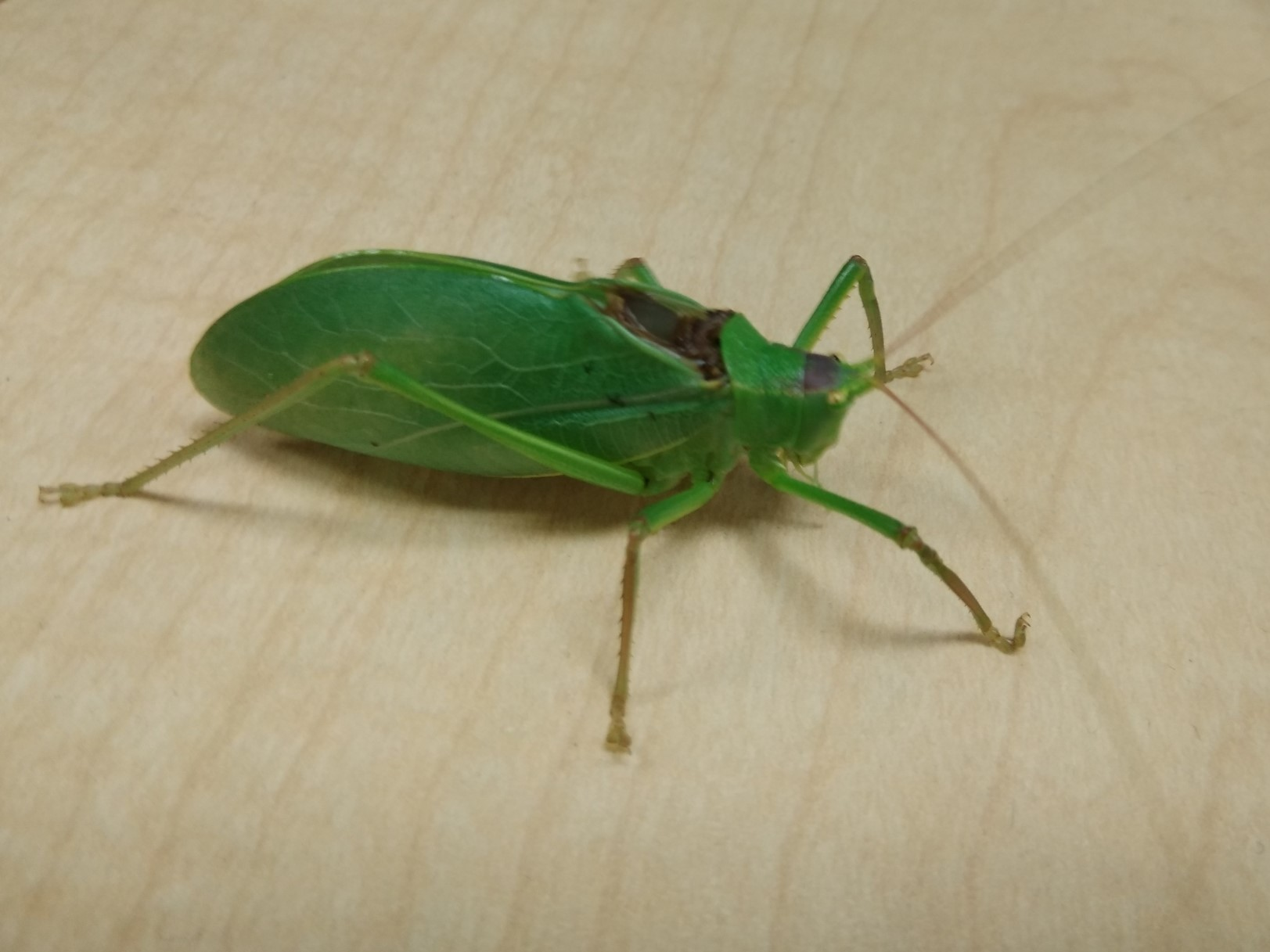

Scientific classification
- Domain: Eukaryota
- Kingdom: Animalia
- Phylum: Arthropoda
- Class: Insecta
- Order: Orthoptera
- Suborder: Ensifera
- Family: Tettigoniidae
- Subfamily: Pseudophyllinae
- Genus: Lea; Caudell, 1906
- Species: L. floridensis

Binomial name
- Lea floridensis (Beutenmüller, 1903)

= Lea floridensis =

Genus of cricket-like animals

Lea floridensis is a species of true katydid in the family Tettigoniidae. It is the only species in the monotypic genus Lea.
