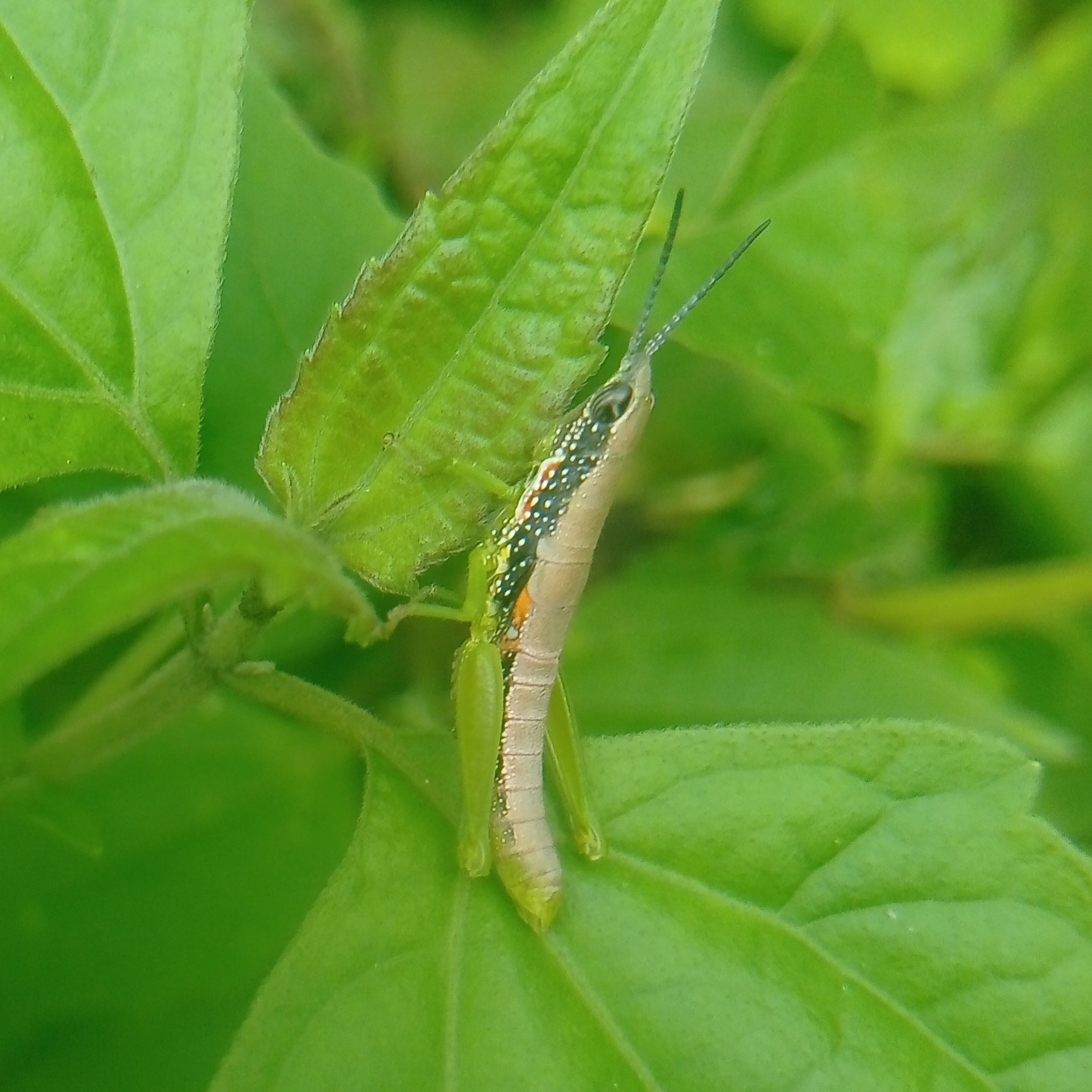

Scientific classification
- Kingdom: Animalia
- Phylum: Arthropoda
- Class: Insecta
- Order: Orthoptera
- Suborder: Caelifera
- Family: Pyrgomorphidae
- Tribe: Orthacridini
- Informal group: Orthacris group
- Genus: Orthacris
- Species: O. maindroni

Binomial name
- Orthacris maindroni Bolívar, 1905

= Orthacris maindroni =

Species of grasshopper

Orthacris maindroni is a species of grasshopper in the family Pyrgomorphidae. It is found in Tamil Nadu and Andhra Pradesh.

== Description ==
The species is straw‑colored, somewhat faded, appearing olive when alive; head dorsally densely punctate, with broad chestnut bands on each side speckled with yellow, beginning behind the eyes and fading before the hind coxae. The fastigium is broad, slightly projecting and bluntly ridged; the eyes are ornamented with curved black parallel lines. The pronotum is weakly sinuate front and back, lateral lobes deflexed with numerous yellow callosities, the lower margins and corners are also yellowish. Tympanum abdominal, prosternal tubercle small conical, mesosternal space very narrow and X‑shaped. Hind tibiae with an inner dark spot and minute external apical spine; abdomen with a narrow chestnut lateral stripe granular whitish. Body about 27 mm (head 4 mm, pronotum 4.2 mm, hind femur 11 mm).
