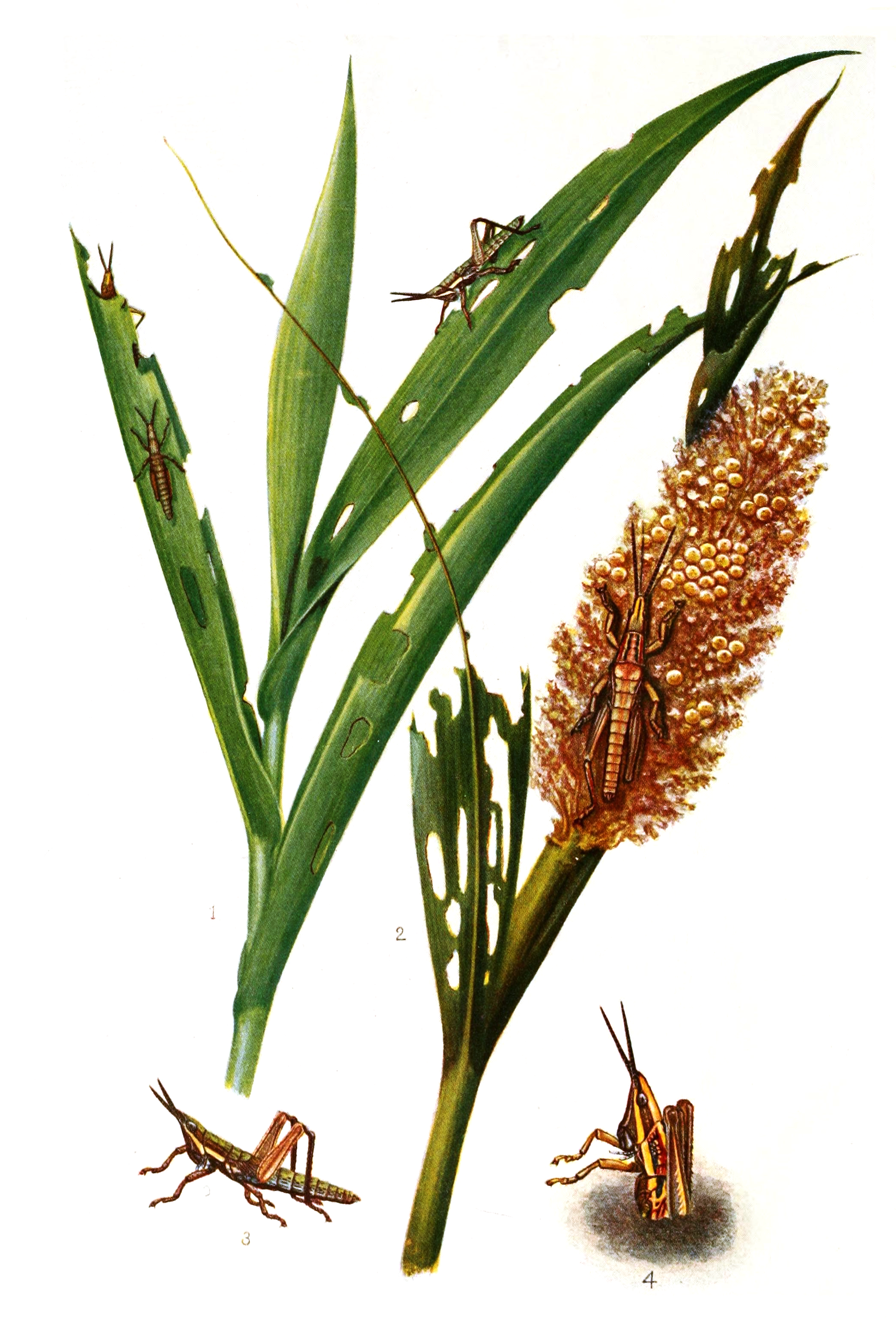
- Illustration of nymphs and adults

Scientific classification
- Domain: Eukaryota
- Kingdom: Animalia
- Phylum: Arthropoda
- Class: Insecta
- Order: Orthoptera
- Suborder: Caelifera
- Family: Pyrgomorphidae
- Tribe: Popoviini
- Genus: Colemania; Bolívar, 1910
- Species: C. sphenarioides

Binomial name
- Colemania sphenarioides Bolívar, 1910

= Colemania =

Genus of grasshoppers

Colemania sphenarioides also known as the Jola or Deccan grasshopper is a species of wingless grasshopper in the monotypic genus Colemania which is endemic to peninsular India. It sometimes causes damage to crops of sorghum. The genus is named after Leslie Coleman, who, along with K. Kunhikannan obtained the type specimens of the species from Honnali and studied the species in southern India. It was described by the Spanish entomologist Ignacio Bolívar.

The species was noted by Maxwell Lefroy even before it was described as a new species. He had called it the Deccan grasshopper. It can be confused with the smaller Orthacris species found in the same area.
