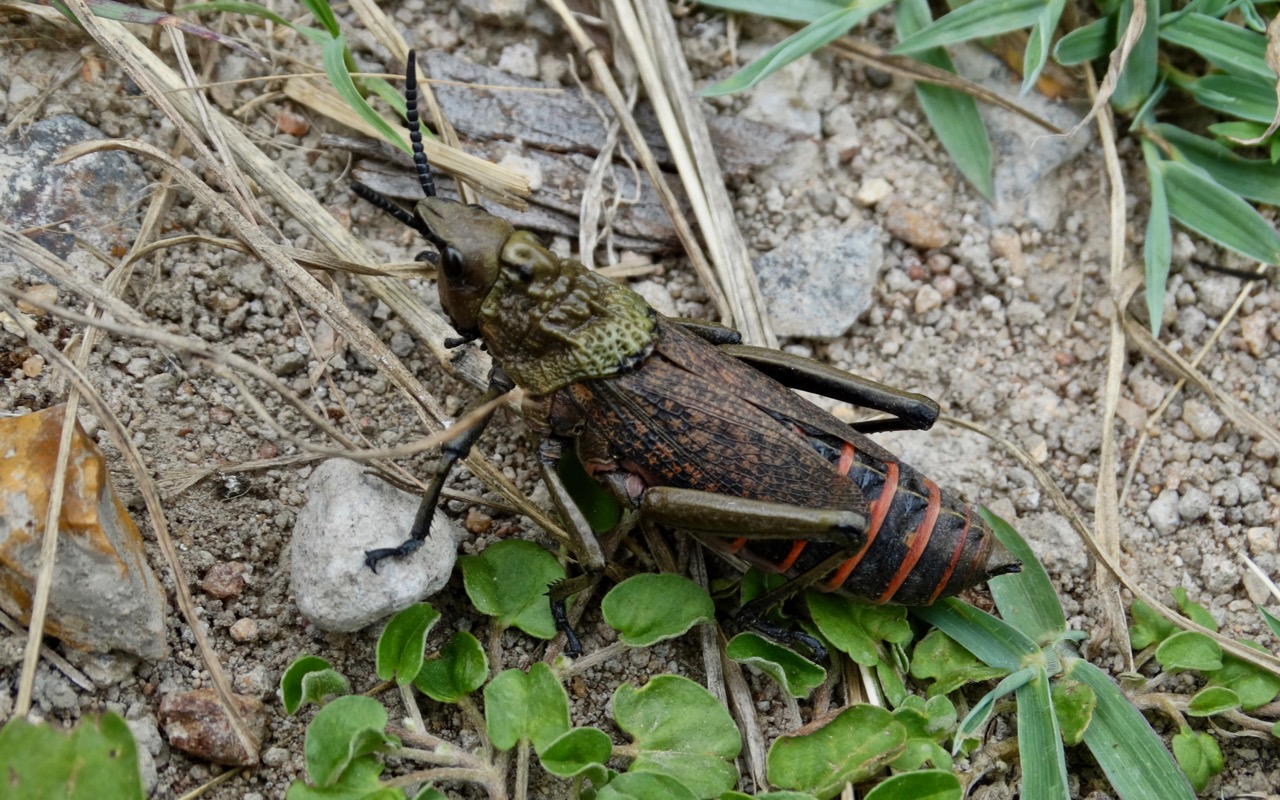
- Adult
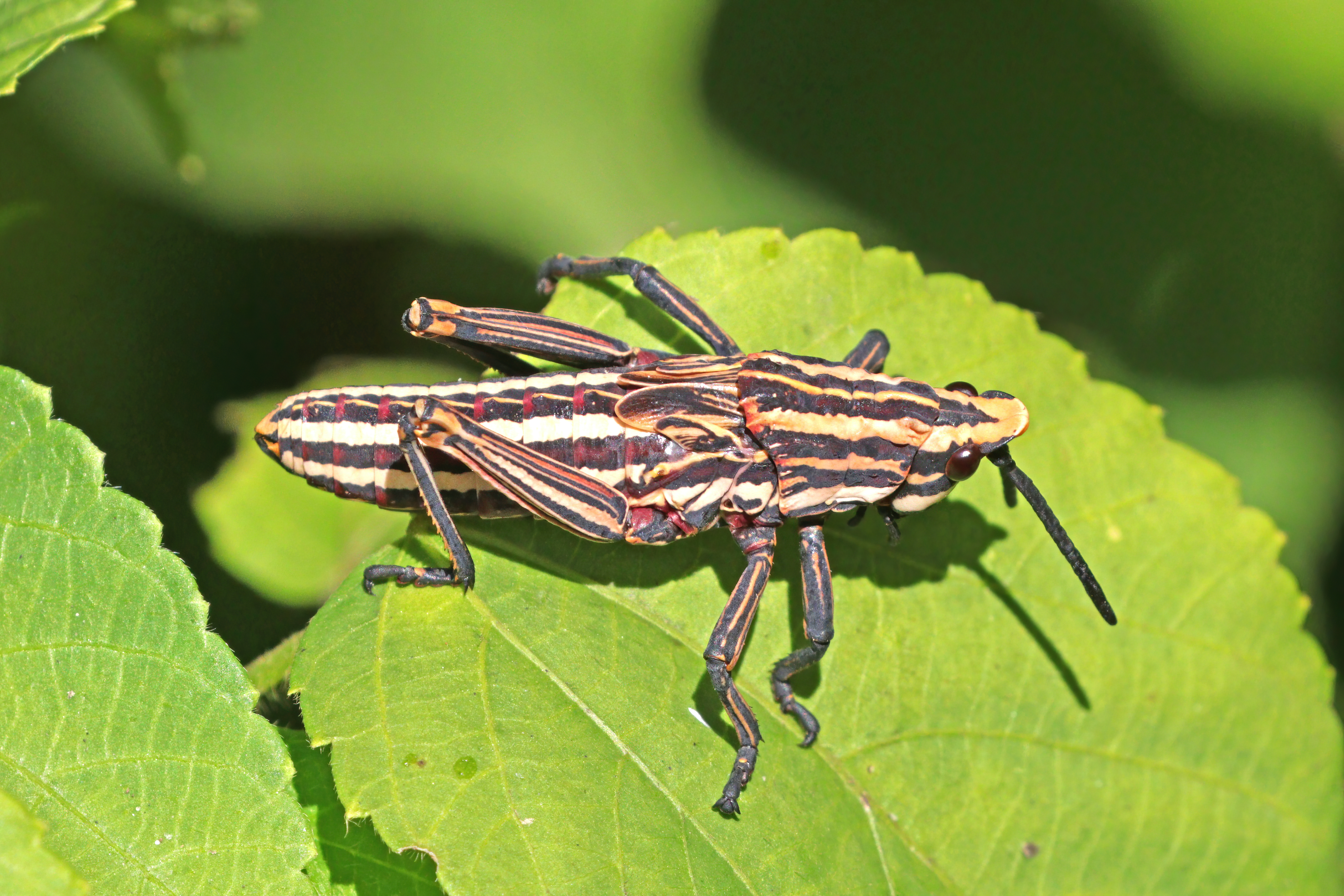
- Nymph

Scientific classification
- Kingdom: Animalia
- Phylum: Arthropoda
- Clade: Pancrustacea
- Class: Insecta
- Order: Orthoptera
- Suborder: Caelifera
- Family: Pyrgomorphidae
- Genus: Dictyophorus
- Species: D. griseus

Binomial name
- Dictyophorus griseus (Reiche & Fairmaire, 1849)

Synonyms
- Petasia grisea Reiche & Fairmaire, 1849

= Dictyophorus griseus =

Species of grasshopper

Dictyophorus griseus is a species of grasshopper in the family Pyrgomorphidae, the gaudy grasshoppers, native to tropical Africa. Adults are typically about 5–6.5 cm (2.0–2.6 in) long.

Two subspecies are accepted:

- Dictyophorus griseus griseus (Reiche & Fairmaire, 1849)
- Dictyophorus griseus oberthueri (Bolívar, 1894)
