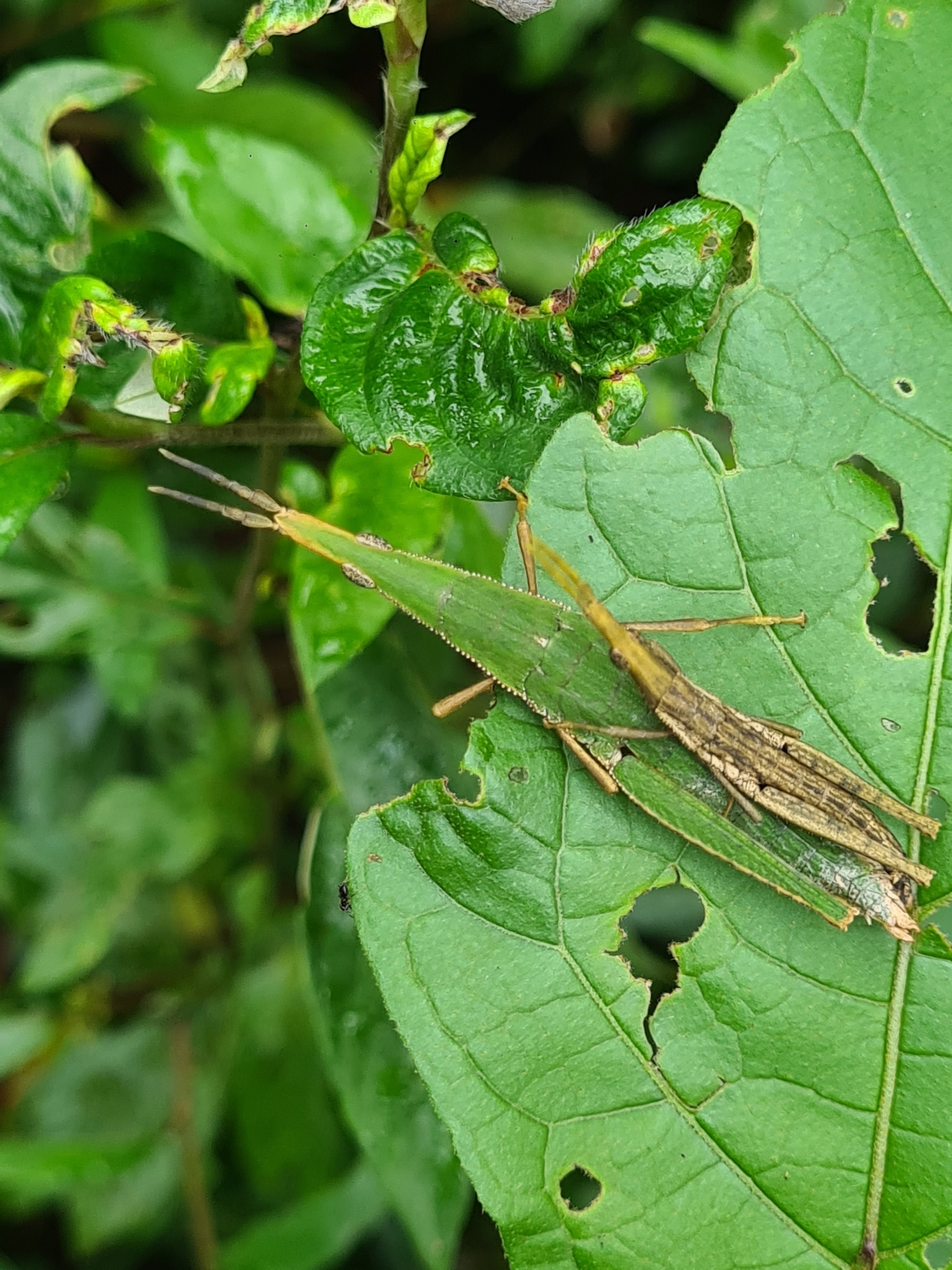

Scientific classification
- Kingdom: Animalia
- Phylum: Arthropoda
- Class: Insecta
- Order: Orthoptera
- Suborder: Caelifera
- Family: Pyrgomorphidae
- Genus: Omura
- Species: O. congrua

Binomial name
- Omura congrua Walker, 1870

= Omura congrua =

Species of insect

Omura congrua is a species of insect from the genus Omura.
