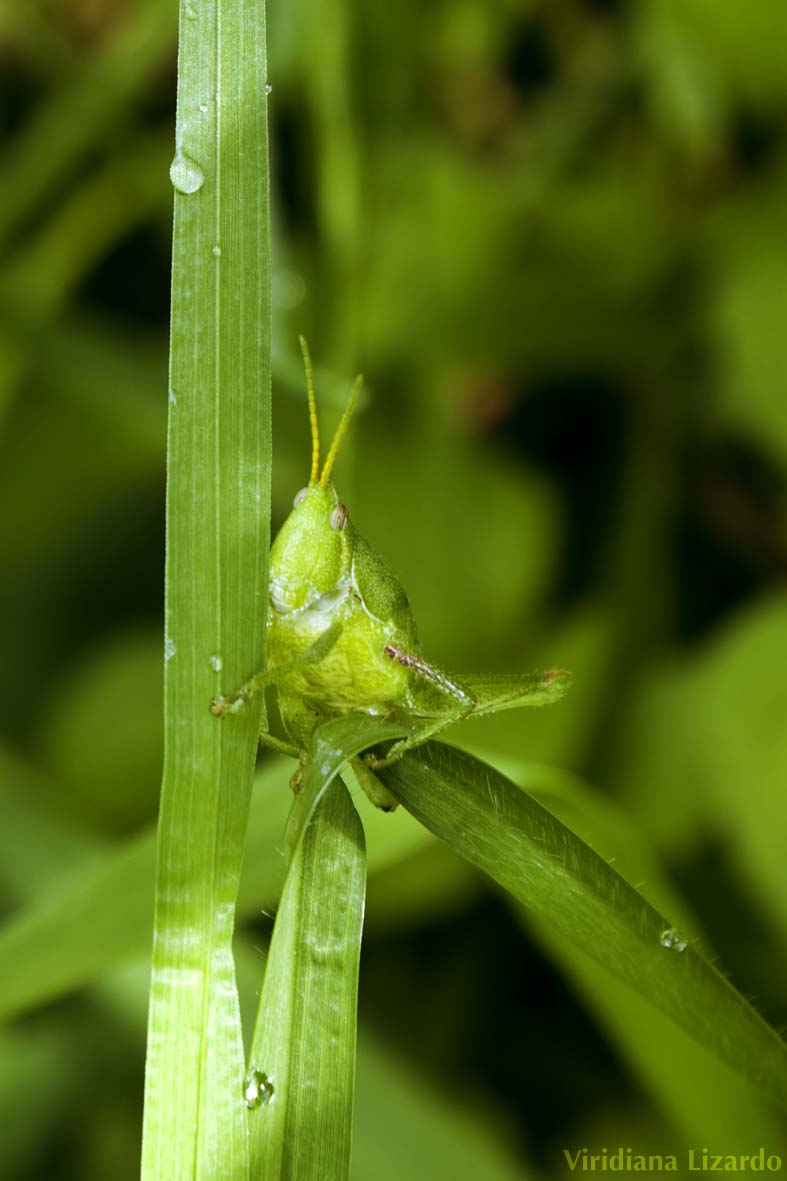
- Chapulín de la milpa (Sphenarium purpurascens)

Scientific classification
- Domain: Eukaryota
- Kingdom: Animalia
- Phylum: Arthropoda
- Class: Insecta
- Order: Orthoptera
- Suborder: Caelifera
- Family: Pyrgomorphidae
- Genus: Sphenarium
- Species: S. purpurascens

Binomial name
- Sphenarium purpurascens Charpentier, 1842

Subspecies
- Sphenarium purpurascens minimum Bruner, L. 1906; Sphenarium purpurascens purpurascens Charpentier, 1842

= Sphenarium purpurascens =

Species of grasshopper

Sphenarium purpurascens (Spanish: Chapulín de milpa and Portuguese: Gafanhoto-do-milho, i.e., corn-field grasshopper), is a grasshopper species in the genus Sphenarium found in Mexico and Guatemala.

The harvesting of the grasshoppers in Mexico for human consumption can be a way for managing pest outbreaks. Such strategies allow decreased use of pesticide and create a source of income for farmers.
