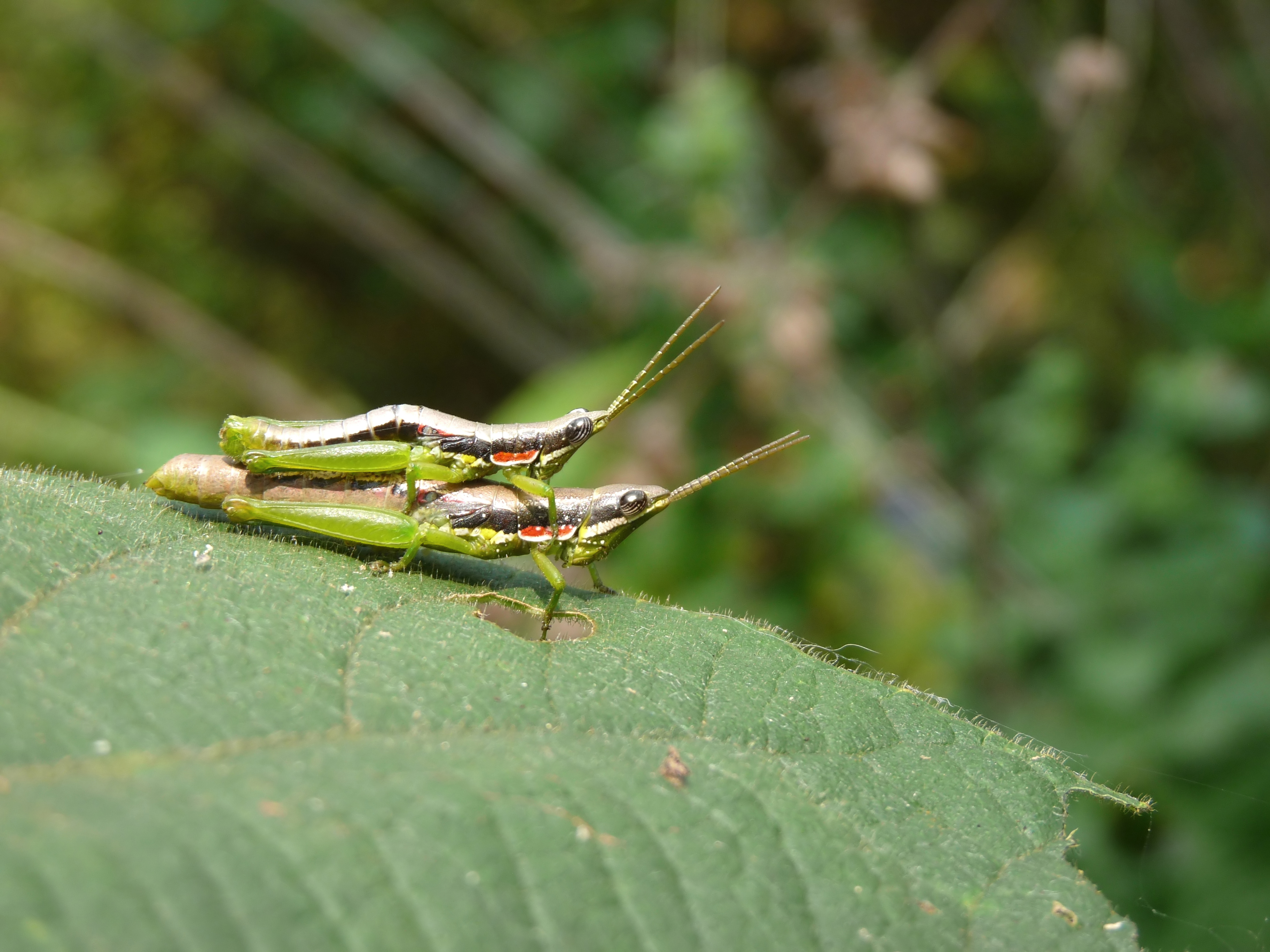
- N. simulans

Scientific classification
- Domain: Eukaryota
- Kingdom: Animalia
- Phylum: Arthropoda
- Class: Insecta
- Order: Orthoptera
- Suborder: Caelifera
- Family: Pyrgomorphidae
- Tribe: Orthacridini
- Genus: Neorthacris; Kevan & Singh, 1964

= Neorthacris =

Genus of grasshoppers

Neorthacris is a genus of wingless grasshoppers in the Pyrgomorphidae. Species in the genus are found in South Asia, mainly in subcontinental India.

== Species ==
Species in the genus include:

1. Neorthacris acuticeps (Bolívar, 1902)
  N. a. acuticeps (Bolívar, 1902) - type species (as Orthacris acuticeps Bolívar)
  N. a. nilgirensis (Uvarov, 1929)
2. Neorthacris longicercata Singh & Kevan, 1965
3. Neorthacris malabarensis Singh & Kevan, 1965
4. Neorthacris palnensis (Uvarov, 1929)
5. Neorthacris simulans (Bolívar, 1902)
