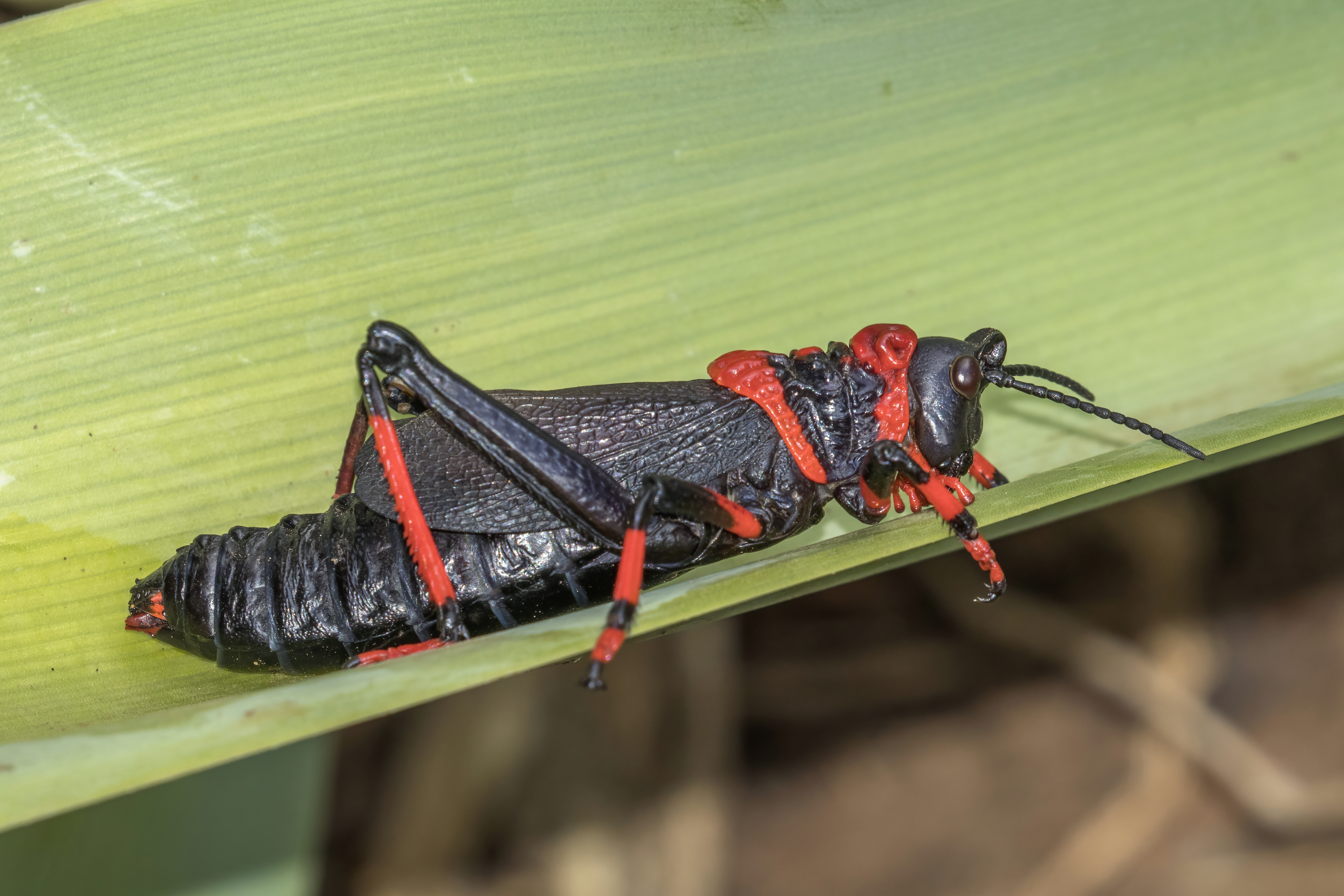

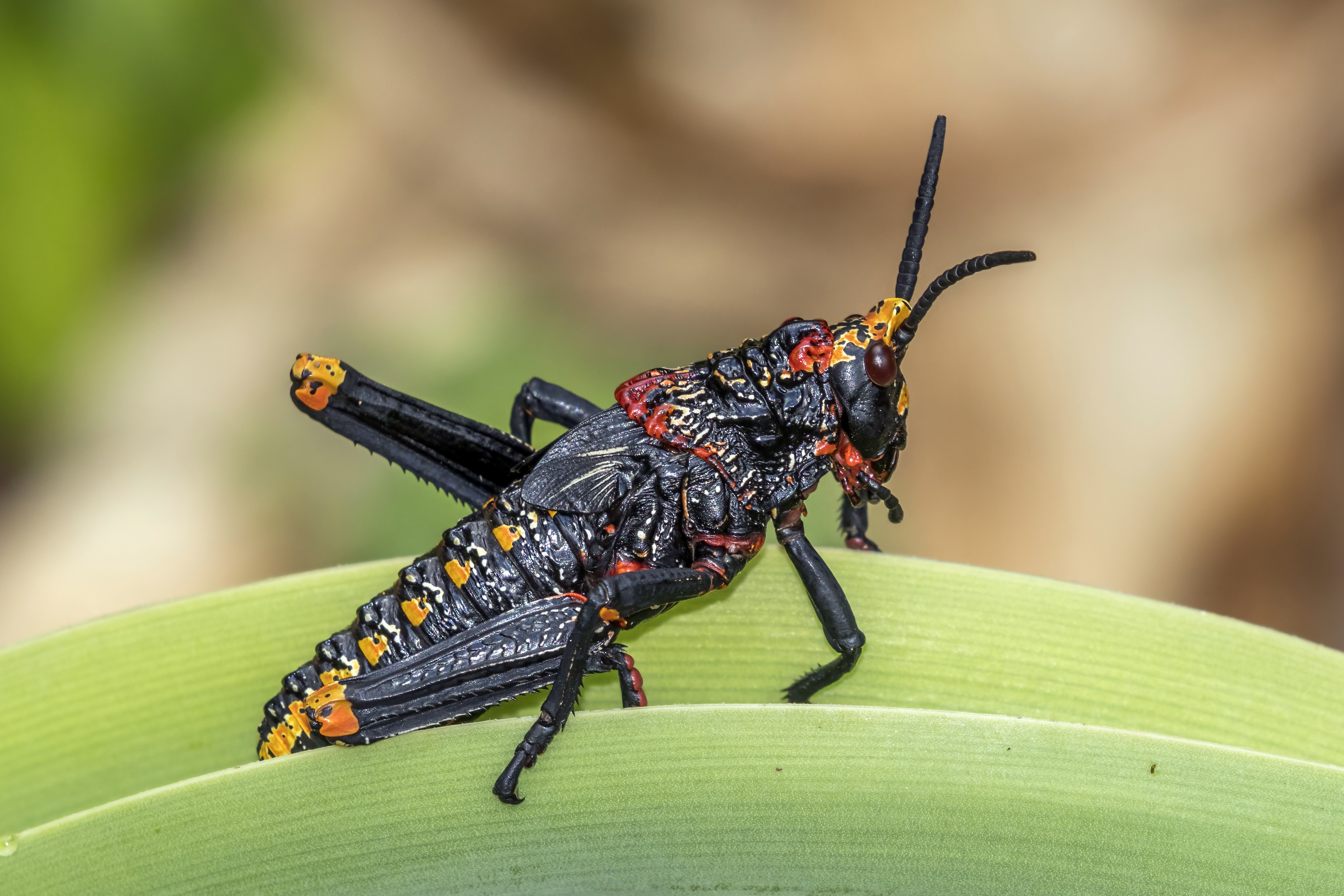
- Adult above, nymph below both D. s. spumans in Walter Sisulu National Botanical Garden, South Africa

Scientific classification
- Kingdom: Animalia
- Phylum: Arthropoda
- Clade: Pancrustacea
- Class: Insecta
- Order: Orthoptera
- Suborder: Caelifera
- Family: Pyrgomorphidae
- Genus: Dictyophorus
- Species: D. spumans

Binomial name
- Dictyophorus spumans (Thunberg, 1787)

Synonyms
- Gryllus spumans; Poecilocera spumans; Petasia spumans; Phymateus spumans; Tapesia spumans

= Dictyophorus spumans =

Species of grasshopper

Dictyophorus spumans, the koppie foam grasshopper, rooibaadjie, or African foam grasshopper, is a species of grasshopper in the family Pyrgomorphidae indigenous to southern Africa. The name "foaming grasshopper" derives from the insect's ability to produce a toxic foam from its thoracic glands. The foam is created by a combination of haemolymph with air from the grasshopper's spiracles. Its genus Dictyophorus is closely related to Phymateus.

Adult males are typically 4.5–5 cm (1.8–2.0 in) long and females typically 5–7 cm (2.0–2.8 in), but can grow up to a length of 8 cm (3.1 in). The neck shield has a warty surface, and the grasshopper's colours are highly variable but usually with at least parts that are contrasting and bright. It is toxic due to the poisons that it sequesters from its diet, which includes a large number of toxic and distasteful plants such as milkweed.

== Subspecies ==
- D. s. subsp. spumans – South Africa
- D. s. subsp. ater – northern South Africa and Zimbabwe
- D. s. subsp. pulchra – eastern South Africa and Mozambique
- D. s. subsp. servillei – southern Africa
- D. s. subsp. calceata – southern Africa

== Gallery ==
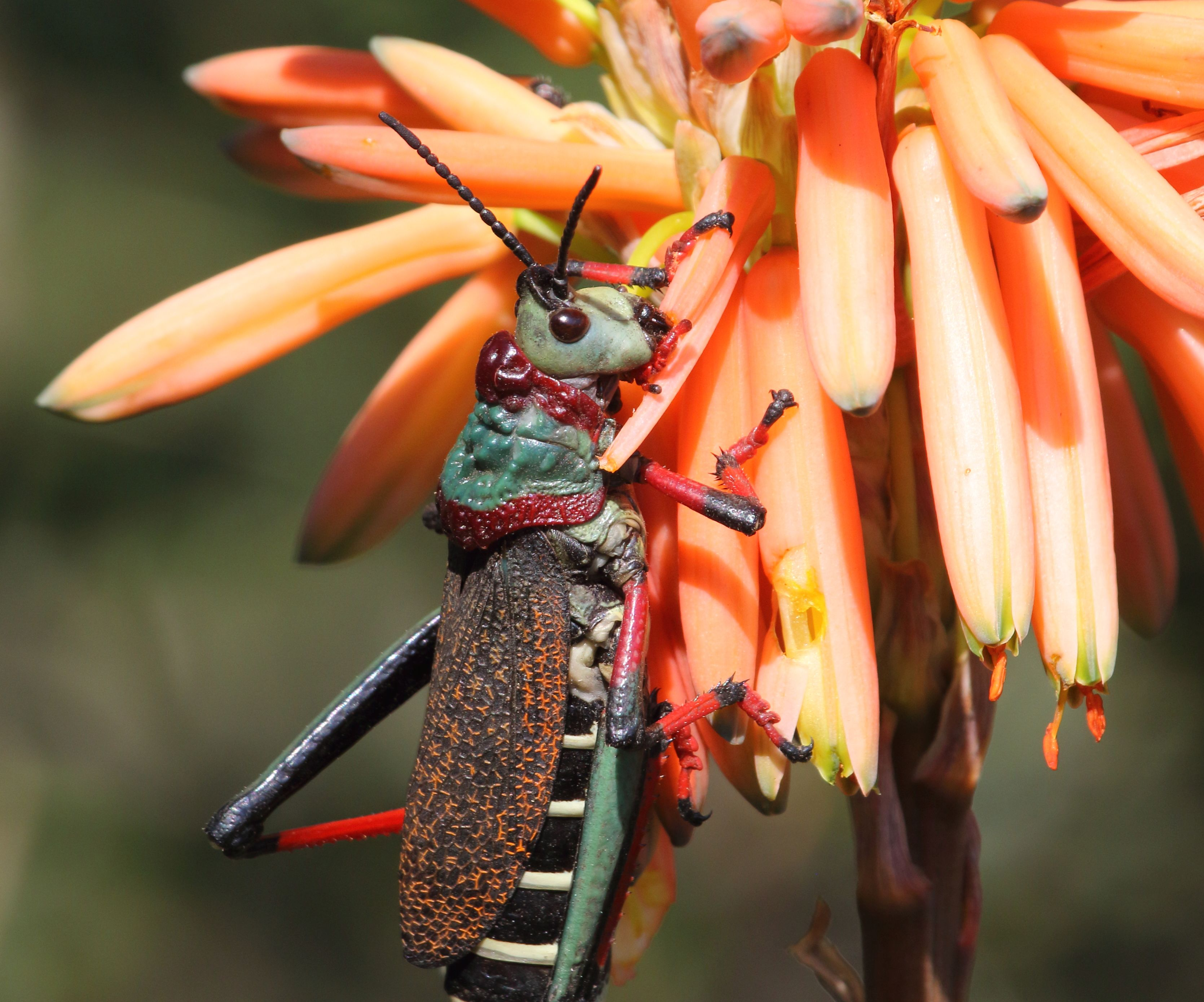
Eating Aloe flowers

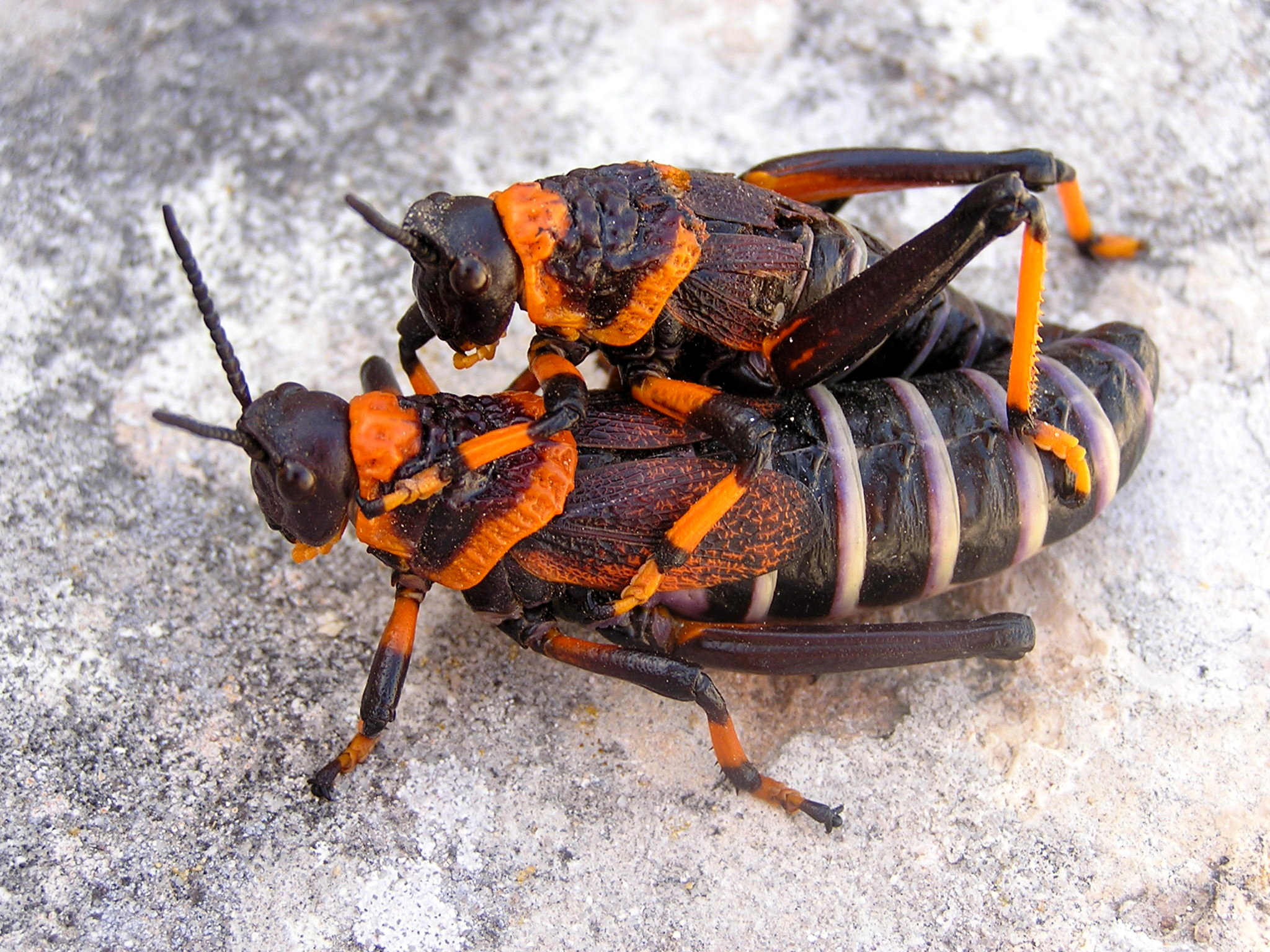
Mating, note size difference

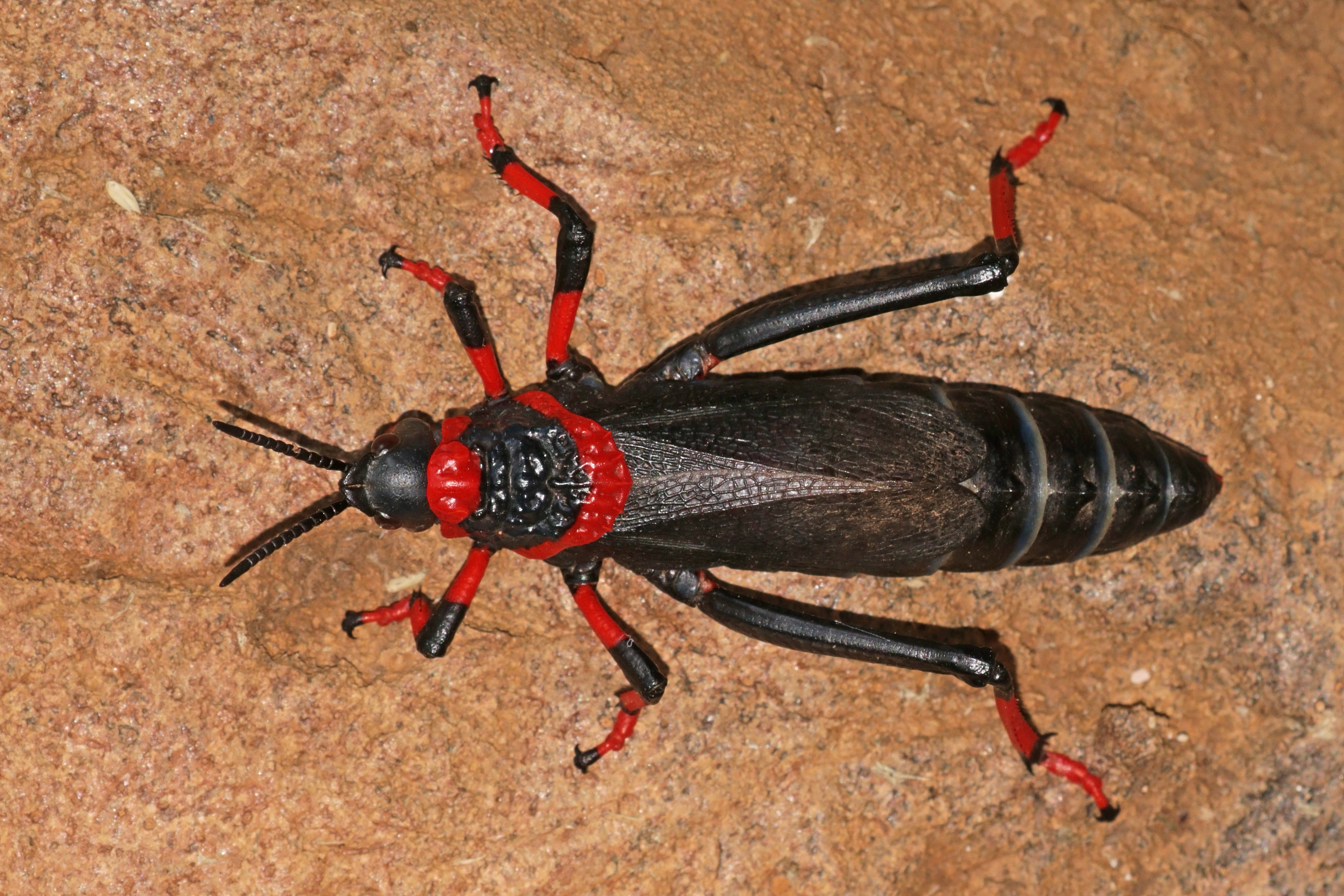
Dorsal view of D. s. spumans

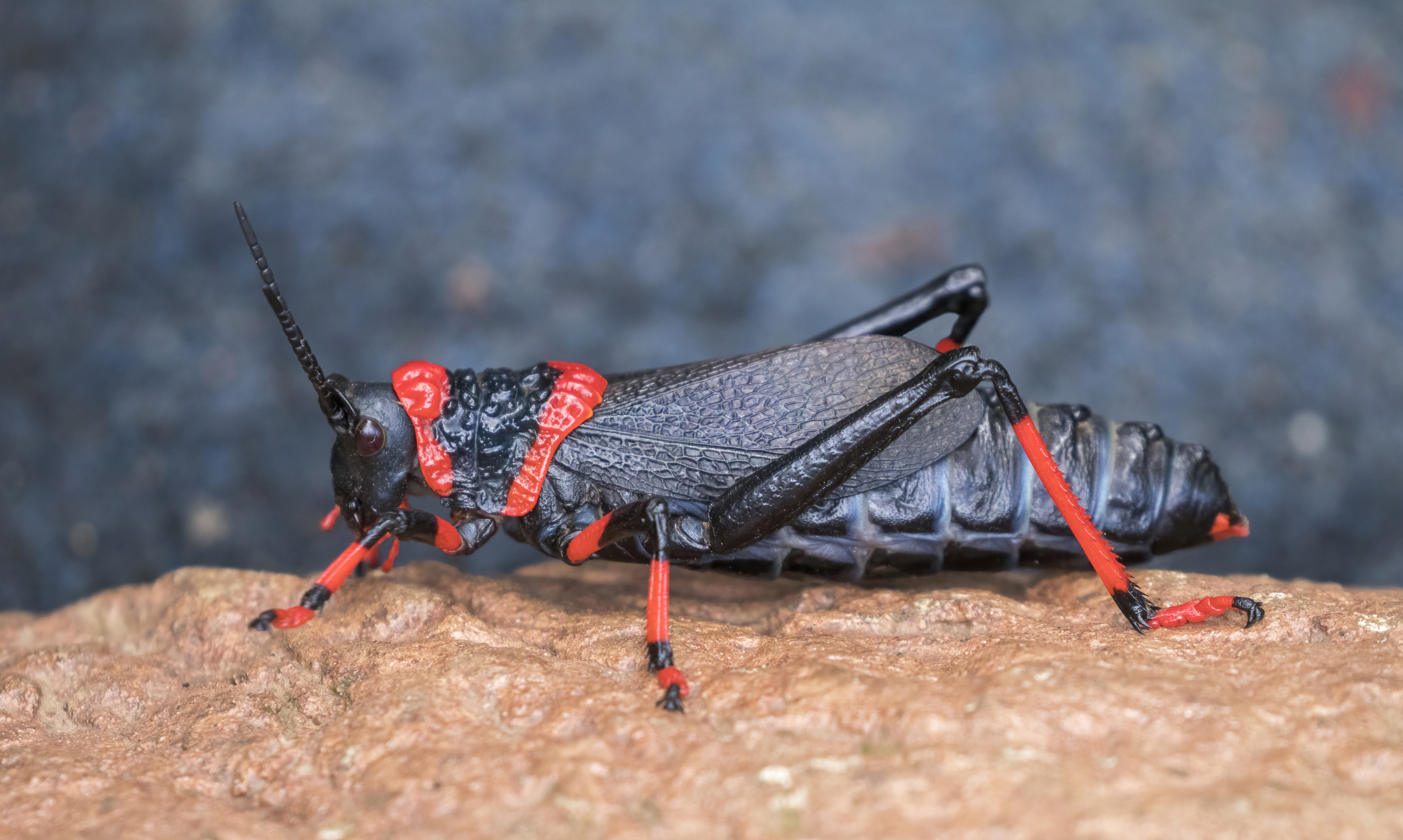
Side view of D. s. spumans

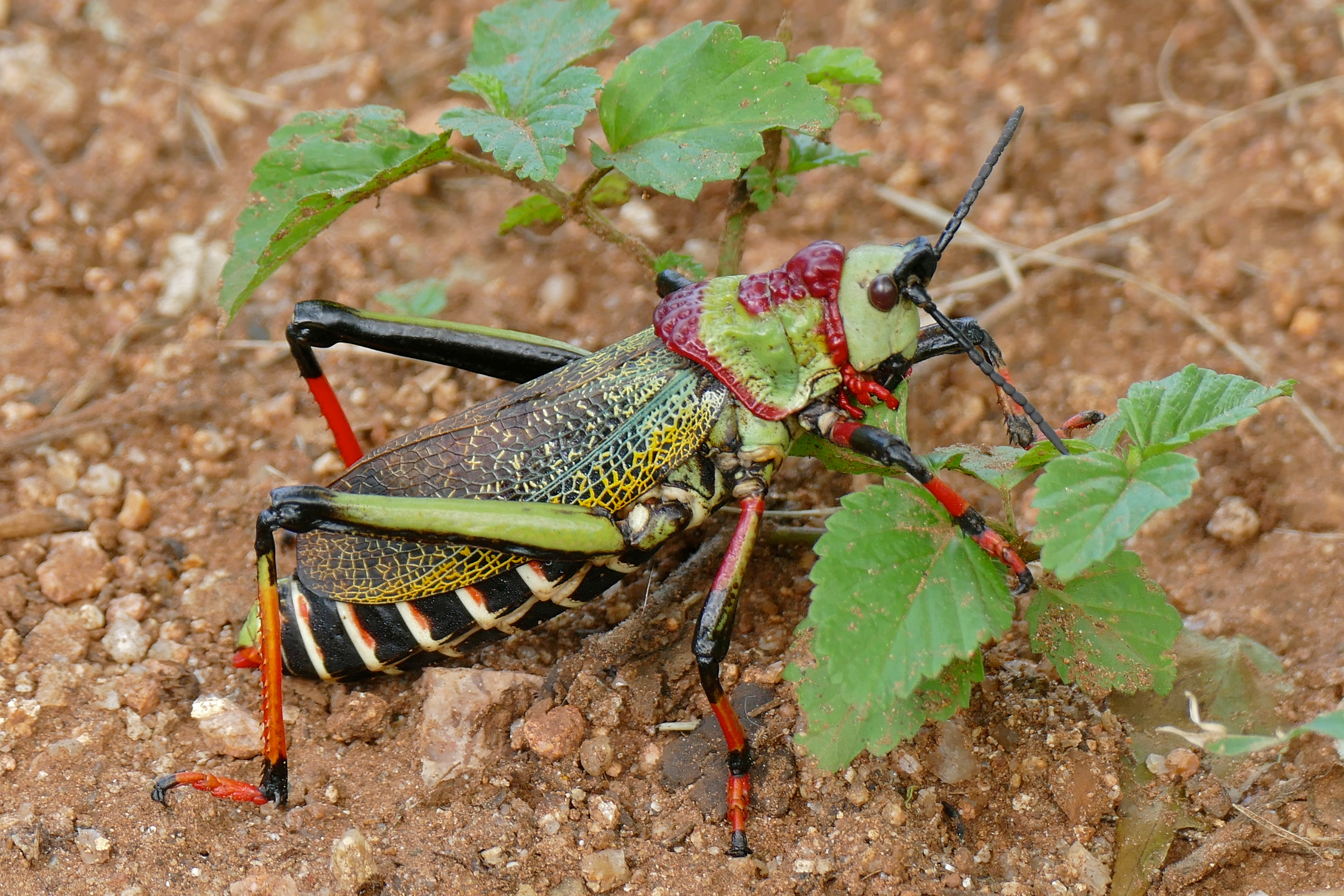
D. s. pulchra

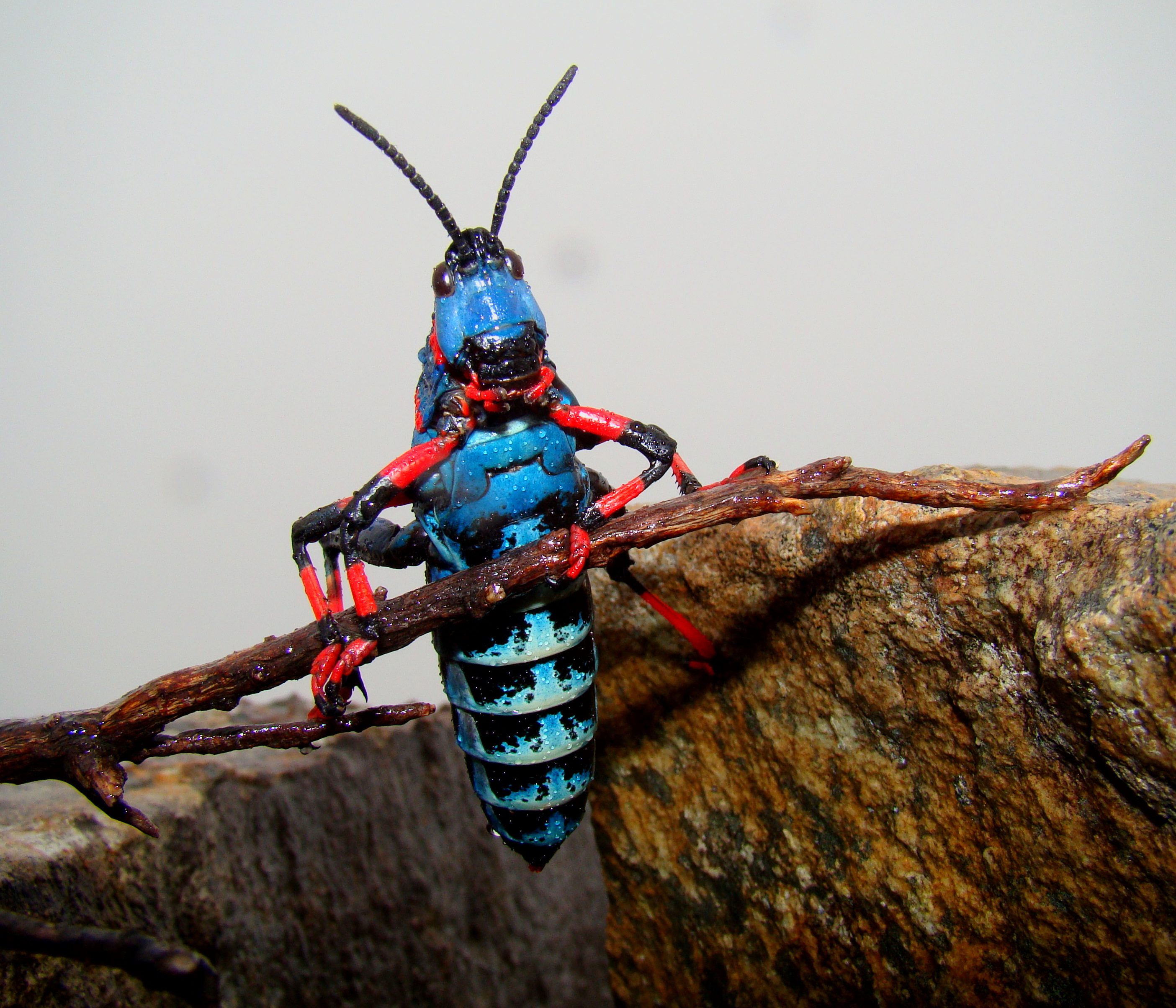
Ventral view

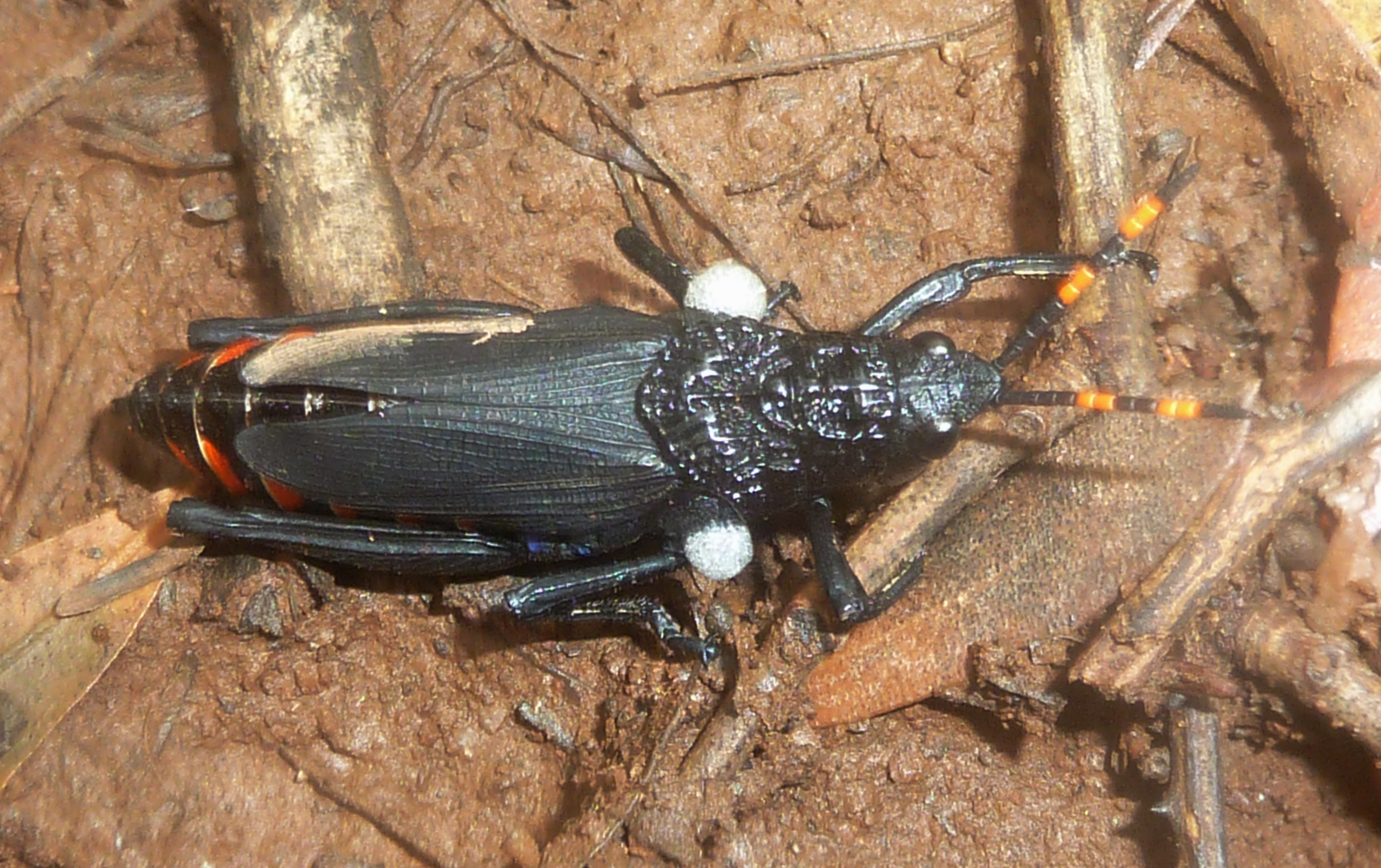
Releasing toxic foam from thoracic glands
