= Kuantania =

Scientific classification
- Domain: Eukaryota
- Kingdom: Animalia
- Phylum: Arthropoda
- Class: Insecta
- Order: Orthoptera
- Suborder: Caelifera
- Family: Pyrgomorphidae
- Subfamily: Orthacridinae
- Tribe: Orthacridini
- Informal group: Orthacris group
- Genus: Kuantania; Miller, 1935

Genus of grasshoppers

Kuantania is a genus of grasshoppers in the family Pyrgomorphidae, subfamily Orthacridinae and tribe Orthacridini.

== Species ==
The Orthoptera Species File lists the following species:

- Kuantania aptera Kevan, 1963 - Vietnam
- Kuantania squamipennis Miller, 1935 - type species - Peninsular Malaysia
