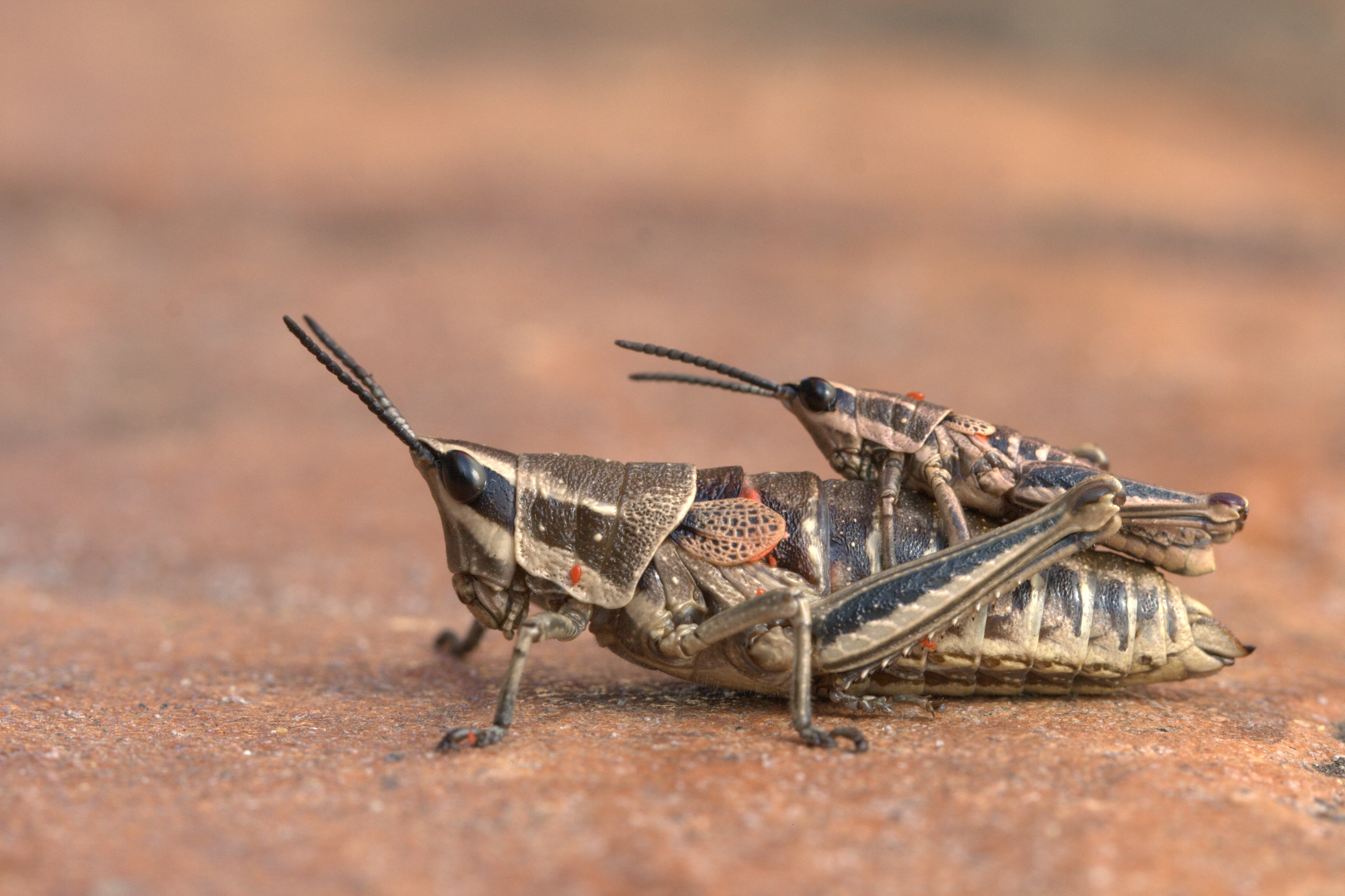
- Monistria concinna

Scientific classification
- Domain: Eukaryota
- Kingdom: Animalia
- Phylum: Arthropoda
- Class: Insecta
- Order: Orthoptera
- Suborder: Caelifera
- Family: Pyrgomorphidae
- Tribe: Monistriini
- Genus: Monistria; Stål, 1873

= Monistria =

Genus of grasshoppers

Monistria is a genus of grasshoppers in the family Pyrgomorphidae and the tribe Monistriini. Species are found Australia, New Zealand and surrounding islands.

== Species ==
The Catalogue of Life and Orthoptera Species File list the following:

- Monistria cicatricosa Rehn, 1953
- Monistria concinna Walker, 1871
- Monistria consobrina Key, 1985
- Monistria discrepans Walker, 1871
- Monistria latevittata Sjöstedt, 1921
- Monistria maculicornis Sjöstedt, 1921
- Monistria pavoninae Rehn, 1953
- Monistria picta Sjöstedt, 1921
- Monistria pustulifera Walker, 1871
- Monistria sulcata Tepper, 1896

== Gallery ==
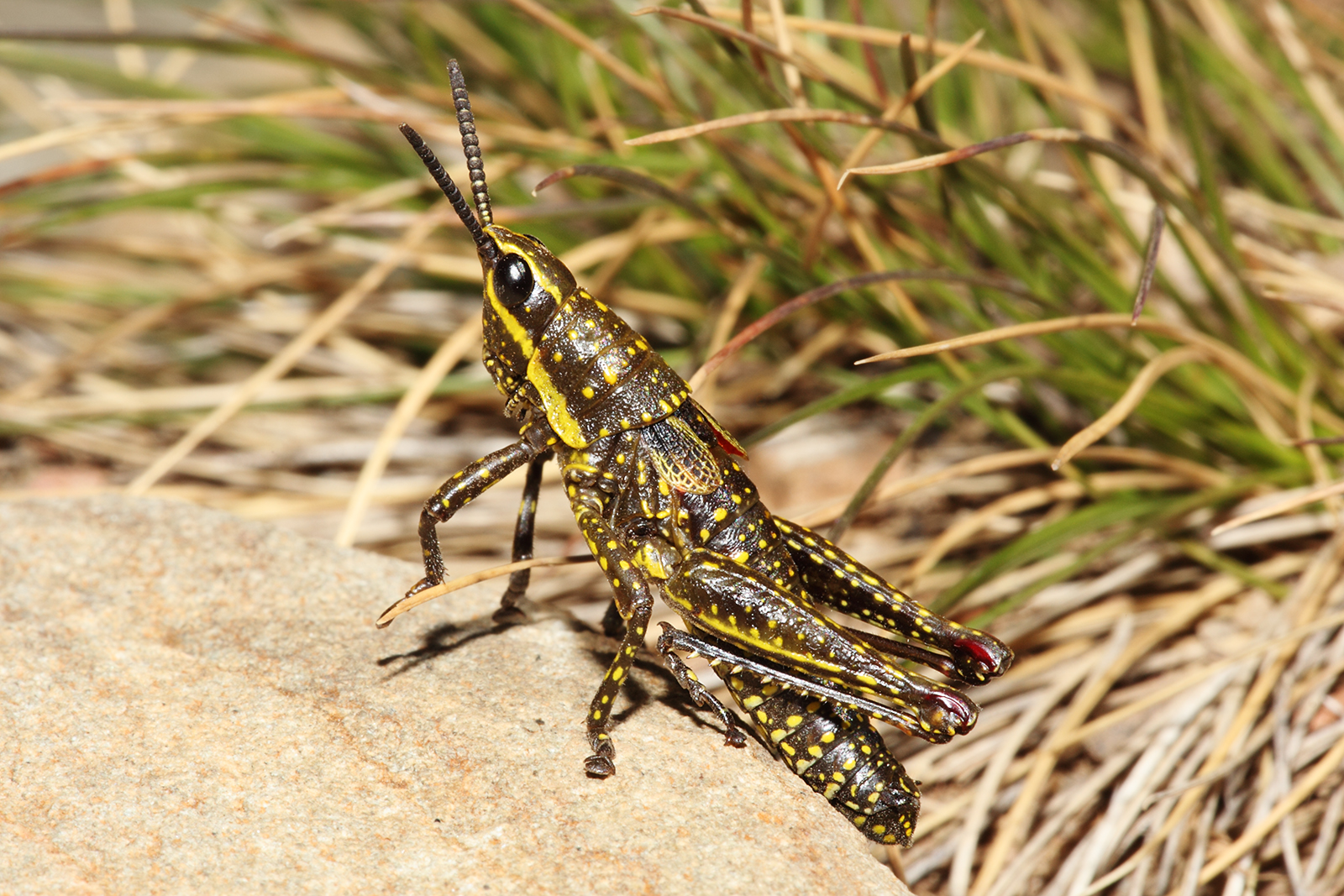

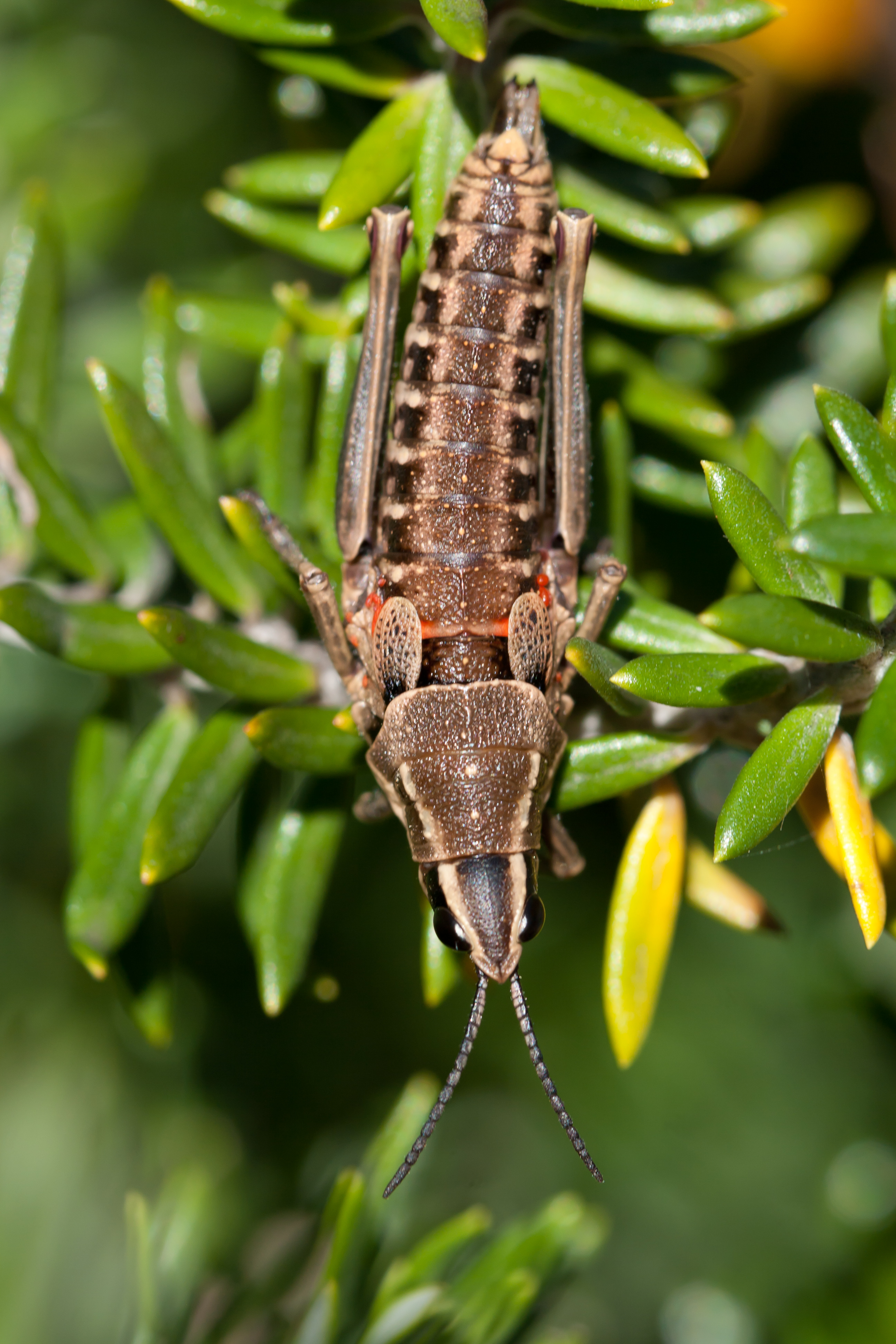

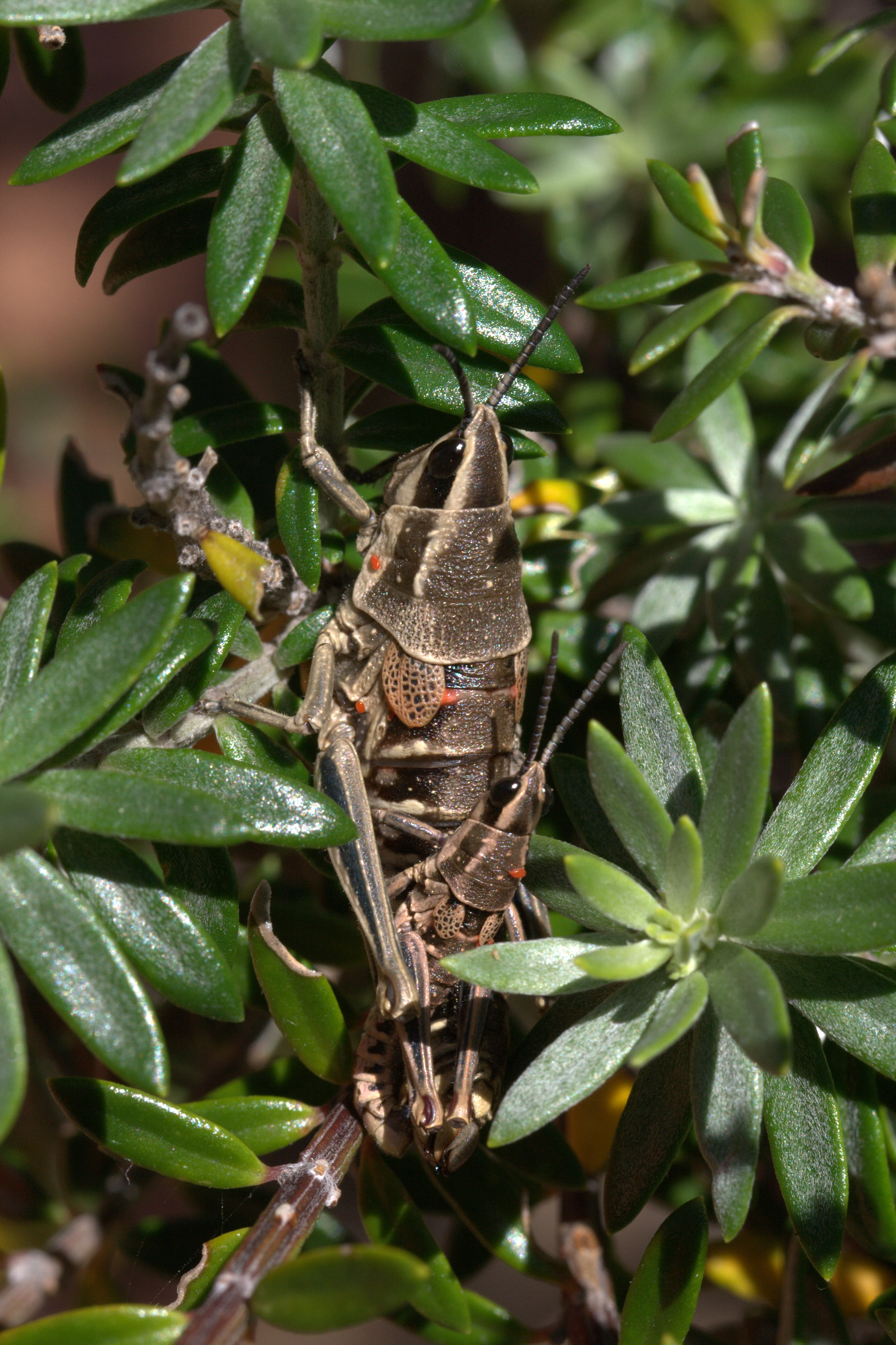
