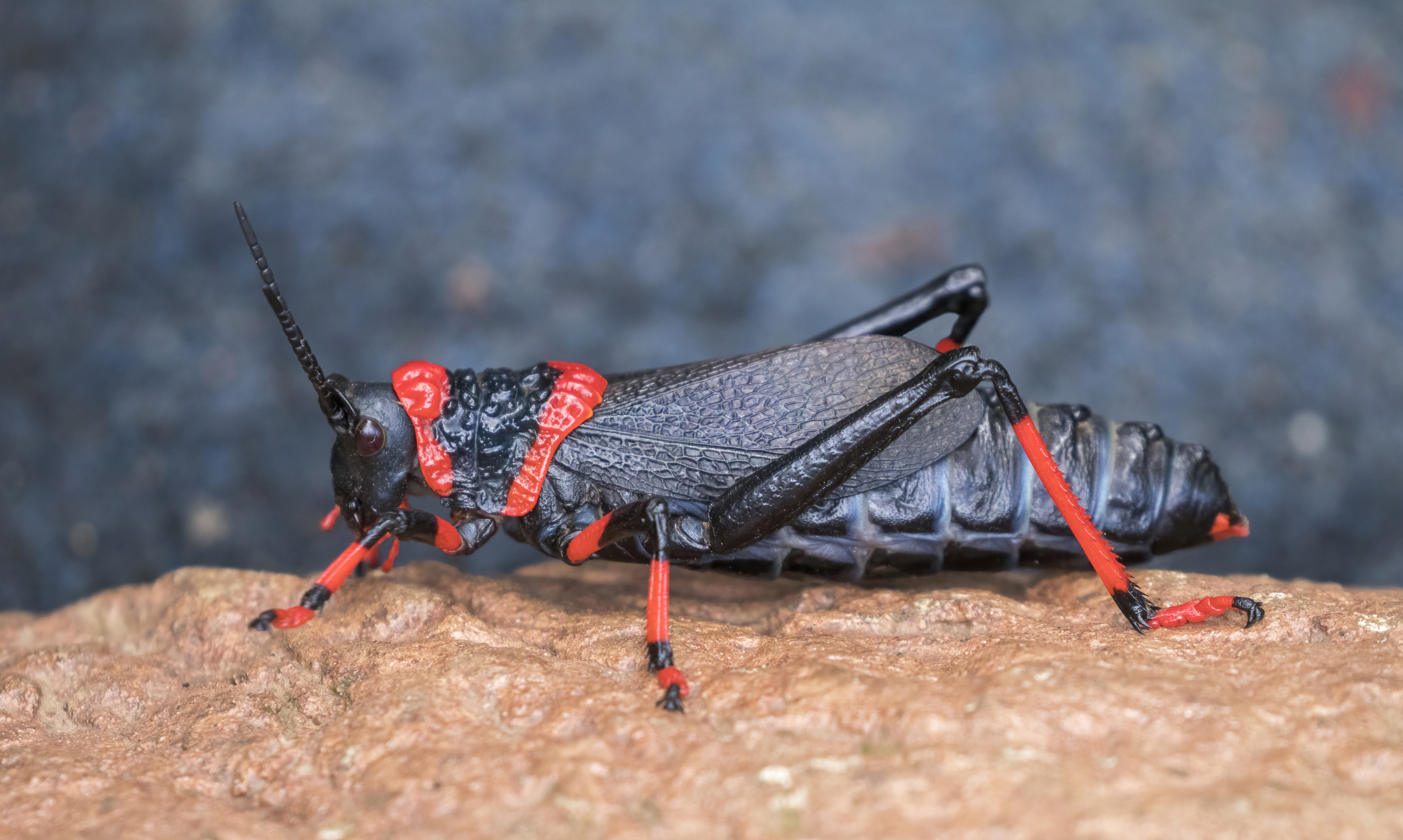
- Koppie foam grasshopper, Dictyophorus spumans, South Africa

Scientific classification
- Kingdom: Animalia
- Phylum: Arthropoda
- Clade: Pancrustacea
- Class: Insecta
- Order: Orthoptera
- Suborder: Caelifera
- Family: Pyrgomorphidae
- Subfamily: Pyrgomorphinae
- Tribe: Dictyophorini
- Genus: Dictyophorus; Thunberg, 1815

Type species
- Gryllus spumans Thunberg, 1787

= Dictyophorus =

Genus of grasshoppers

Dictyophorus is the type genus of grasshoppers in the tribe Dictyophorini, of the family Pyrgomorphidae; it is native to sub-Saharan Africa. The genus was named by Carl Peter Thunberg in 1815. They are relatively large, typically about 4–7 cm (1.6–2.8 in) long, and often have bright colours warning of their toxicity.

== Species ==
These species belong to the genus Dictyophorus:

subgenus Dictyophorus Thunberg, 1815

1. Dictyophorus cuisinieri (Carl, 1916)
2. Dictyophorus spumans (Thunberg, 1787) – koppie foam grasshopper

subgenus Tapesiella Kevan, 1953

1. Dictyophorus griseus (Reiche & Fairmaire, 1849)
2. Dictyophorus karschi (Bolívar, 1904)
