= Megradina =

Megradina festiva

Scientific classification
- Kingdom: Animalia
- Phylum: Arthropoda
- Clade: Pancrustacea
- Class: Insecta
- Order: Orthoptera
- Suborder: Caelifera
- Family: Pyrgomorphidae
- Subfamily: Orthacridinae
- Tribe: Nereniini
- Genus: Megradina; Storozhenko, 2004
- Species: M. festiva

Binomial name
- Megradina festiva Storozhenko, 2004

Genus of grasshoppers

Megradina festiva is a grasshopper species in the monotypic genus Megradina, found in Vietnam. It is in the family Pyrgomorphidae, subfamily Orthacridinae, and tribe Nereniini. It is closely related to the New Guinea grasshopper genus Megra.

Megradina festiva is a medium-sized grasshopper with a large, finely punctate head and a slender, elongated body. The total body length reaches 25.8 mm (1.0 in) in males and 45 mm (1.8 in) in females. The holotype is a male collected in the Central Highlands of Vietnam in 1995 by Andrey Vasil'evich Gorochov.
