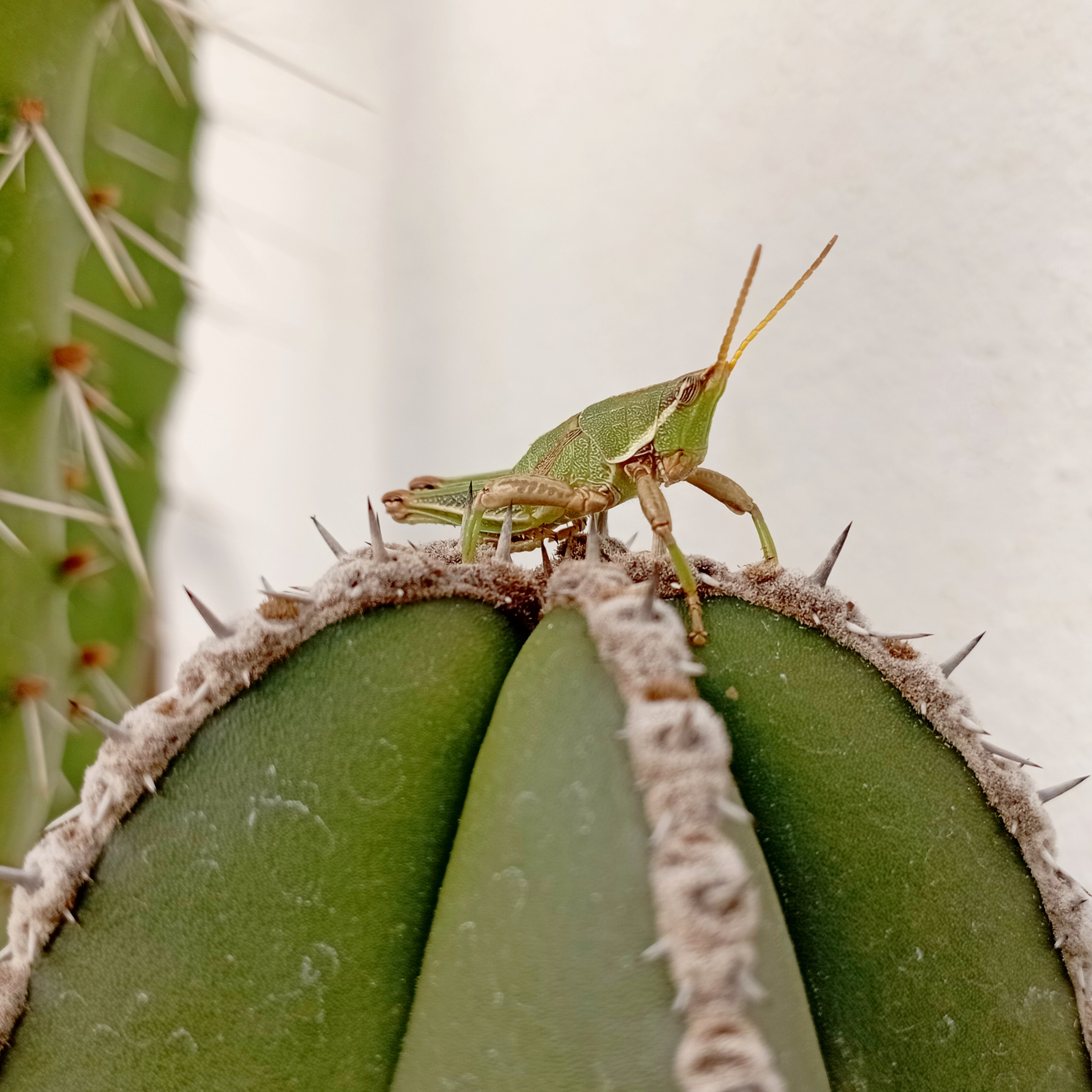
- Sphenarium purpurascens

Scientific classification
- Domain: Eukaryota
- Kingdom: Animalia
- Phylum: Arthropoda
- Class: Insecta
- Order: Orthoptera
- Suborder: Caelifera
- Family: Pyrgomorphidae
- Subfamily: Pyrgomorphinae
- Tribe: Sphenariini
- Genus: Sphenarium; Charpentier, 1842

Species
- See text

= Sphenarium =

Genus of grasshoppers

Sphenarium is a genus of grasshoppers in the family Pyrgomorphidae, native to Mexico and northern Central America. During outbreaks, they can cause significant damage to agricultural crops. Conversely, they have been caught for human consumption, for example as chapulines, since pre-Columbian times, a practice that also continues today.

== Species ==
- Sphenarium adelinae, Sanabria-Urbán, Song & Cueva del Castillo, 2017
- Sphenarium borrei, Bolívar, 1884
- Sphenarium crypticum, Sanabria-Urbán, Song & Cueva del Castillo, 2017
- Sphenarium histrio, Gerstaecker, 1884
- Sphenarium infernalis, Sanabria-Urbán, Song & Cueva del Castillo, 2017
- Sphenarium macrophallicum, Kevan & Boyle, 1978
- Sphenarium mexicanum, Saussure, 1859
- Sphenarium minimum, Bruner, 1906
- Sphenarium miztecum, Sanabria-Urbán, Song & Cueva del Castillo, 2017
- Sphenarium occidentalis, Sanabria-Urbán, Song & Cueva del Castillo, 2017
- Sphenarium planum, Bruner, 1906
- Sphenarium purpurascens, Charpentier, 1845
- Sphenarium rugosum, Bruner, 1906
- Sphenarium tarascum, Sanabria-Urbán, Song & Cueva del Castillo, 2017
- Sphenarium totonacum, Sanabria-Urbán, Song & Cueva del Castillo, 2017
- Sphenarium variabile, Kevan & Boyle, 1978
- Sphenarium zapotecum, Sanabria-Urbán, Song & Cueva del Castillo, 2017
