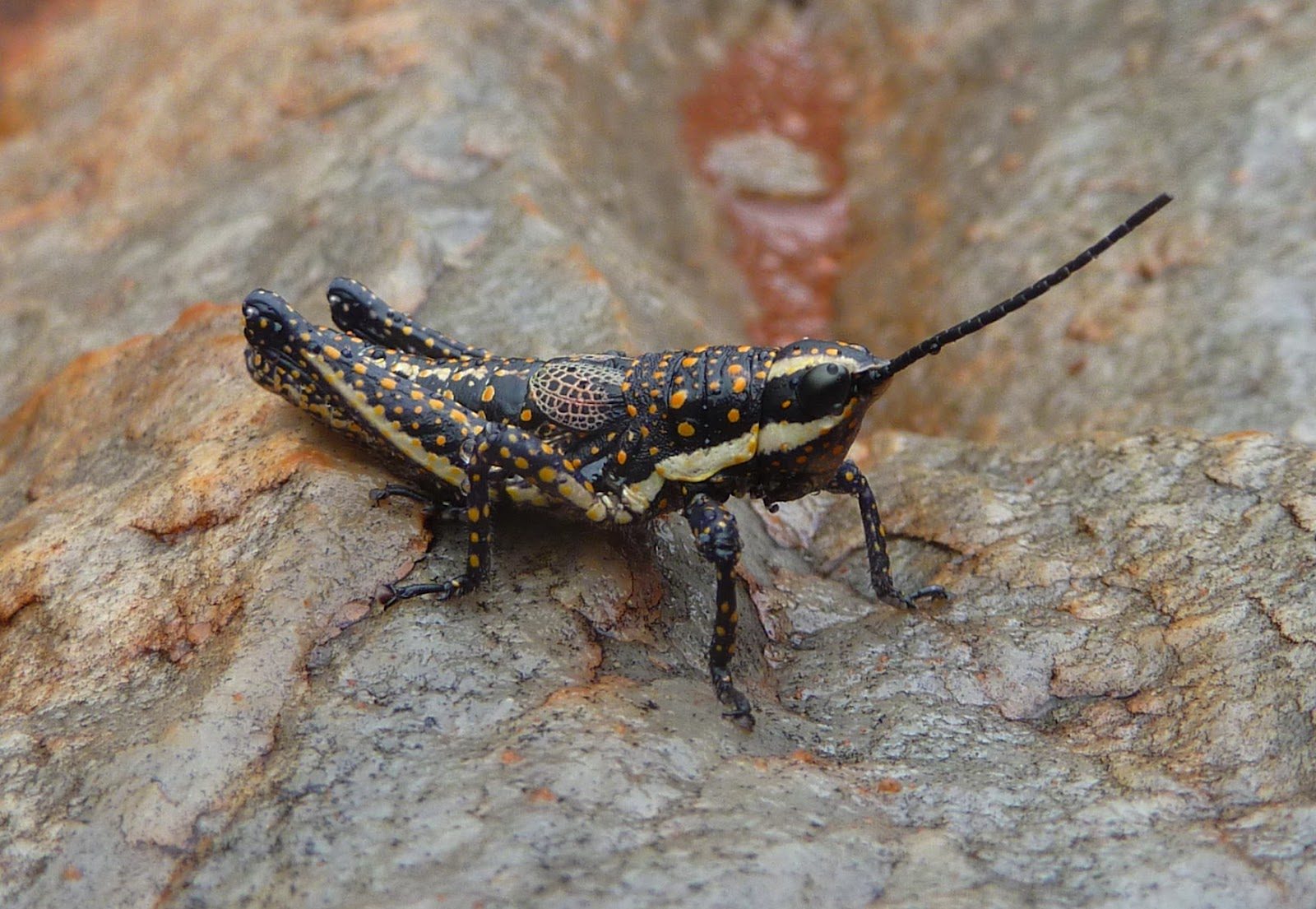

Scientific classification
- Kingdom: Animalia
- Phylum: Arthropoda
- Clade: Pancrustacea
- Class: Insecta
- Order: Orthoptera
- Suborder: Caelifera
- Family: Pyrgomorphidae
- Genus: Monistria
- Species: M. pustulifera

Binomial name
- Monistria pustulifera (Walker, 1871)

= Blistered pyrgomorph =

Species of grasshopper

The blistered pyrgomorph (Monistria pustulifera) is a species of wingless grasshopper of the family Pyrgomorphidae, endemic to Australia.

The species is most commonly found on desert fuchsia plants of the genus Eremophila, in particular Eremophila gilesii. It is also known to eat garden plants such as Buddleja, dahlias, honeysuckle and privet.
