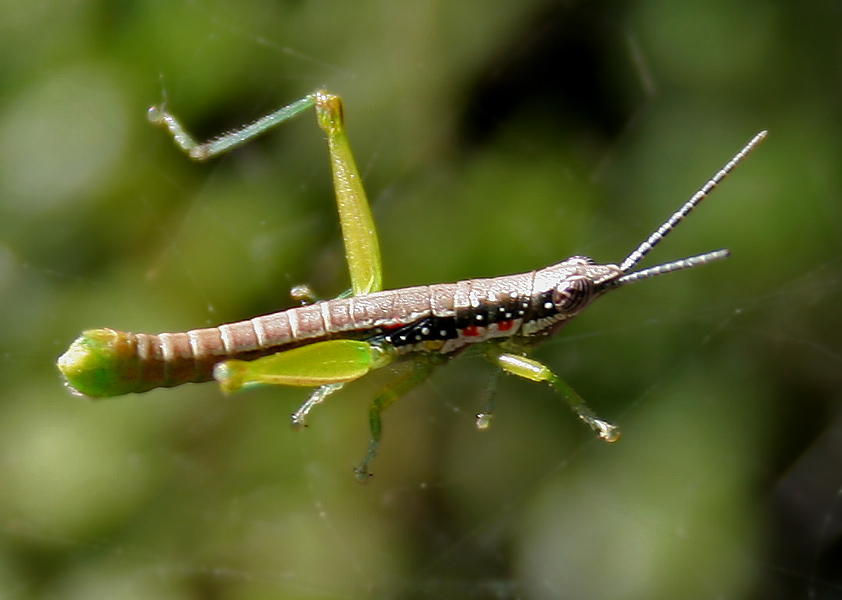
- Orthacris sp.

Scientific classification
- Domain: Eukaryota
- Kingdom: Animalia
- Phylum: Arthropoda
- Class: Insecta
- Order: Orthoptera
- Suborder: Caelifera
- Family: Pyrgomorphidae
- Subfamily: Orthacridinae; Bolívar, 1905

Synonyms
- Ortacrinae Bolívar, 1905

= Orthacridinae =

Subfamily of grasshoppers

The Orthacridinae are a sub-family of grasshoppers (Orthoptera : Caelifera) in the family Pyrgomorphidae. Species are found in: Central America, Africa, Asia, Australia and certain Pacific Islands. The type genus is Orthacris and the taxon proposed by Bolívar in 1905.

== Tribes and genera ==
The Orthoptera Species File lists the following:

=== Tribes A-M ===
- Tribe Brunniellini Kevan, 1963 - Philippines
  - Genus Brunniella Bolívar, 1905
- Tribe Chapmanacridini Kevan & Akbar, 1964 - W. Africa
  - Genus Chapmanacris Dirsh, 1959
- Tribe Fijipyrgini Kevan, 1966 - Fiji
  - Genus Fijipyrgus Kevan, 1966
- Tribe Geloiini Bolívar, 1905 - Madagascar
  - Genus Geloius Saussure, 1899
  - Genus Pseudogeloius Dirsh, 1963
- Tribe Gymnohippini Kevan & Akbar, 1964 - Madagascar
  - Genus Gymnohippus Bruner, 1910
  - Genus Pyrgohippus Dirsh, 1963
  - Genus Uhagonia Bolívar, 1905
- Tribe Ichthiacridini Kevan, Singh & Akbar, 1964 - Mexico
  - Genus Calamacris Rehn, 1904
  - Genus Ichthiacris Bolívar, 1905
  - Genus Sphenacris Bolívar, 1884
- Tribe Ichthyotettigini Kevan, Singh & Akbar, 1964 - Mexico
  - Genus Ichthyotettix Rehn, 1901
  - Genus Piscacris Kevan, Singh & Akbar, 1964
  - Genus Pyrgotettix Kevan, Singh & Akbar, 1964
  - Genus Sphenotettix Kevan & Akbar, 1964
- Tribe Malagasphenini Kevan & Akbar, 1964 - Madagascar
  - Genus Malagasphena Kevan, Akbar & Singh, 1964
- Tribe Mitricephalini Kevan & Akbar, 1964 - Malesia
  - Genus Mitricephala Bolívar, 1898
  - Genus Mitricephaloides Kevan, 1963

=== Nereniini ===
Auth. Kevan, 1964;

genus group Kapaoria - New Guinea

1. Buergersius Ramme, 1930
2. Fusiacris Willemse, 1955
3. Kapaoria Bolívar, 1898
4. Tarbaleopsis Ramme, 1930

genus group Paratarbaleus - New Guinea

1. Modernacris Willemse, 1931
2. Noonacris Kevan, 1966
3. Paratarbaleus Ramme, 1941

incertae sedis

1. Megra Campion, 1923 - New Guinea
2. Megradina Storozhenko, 2004 - monotypic: Megradina festiva Storozhenko, 2004 - Vietnam
3. Nerenia Bolívar, 1905 - monotypic: Nerenia francoisi Bolívar, 1905 - New Caledonia

=== Orthacridini ===
Auth. Bolívar, 1905; distribution: E. Africa, Madagascar, India, Indo-China.

subtribe Caprorhinina Kevan & Akbar, 1964

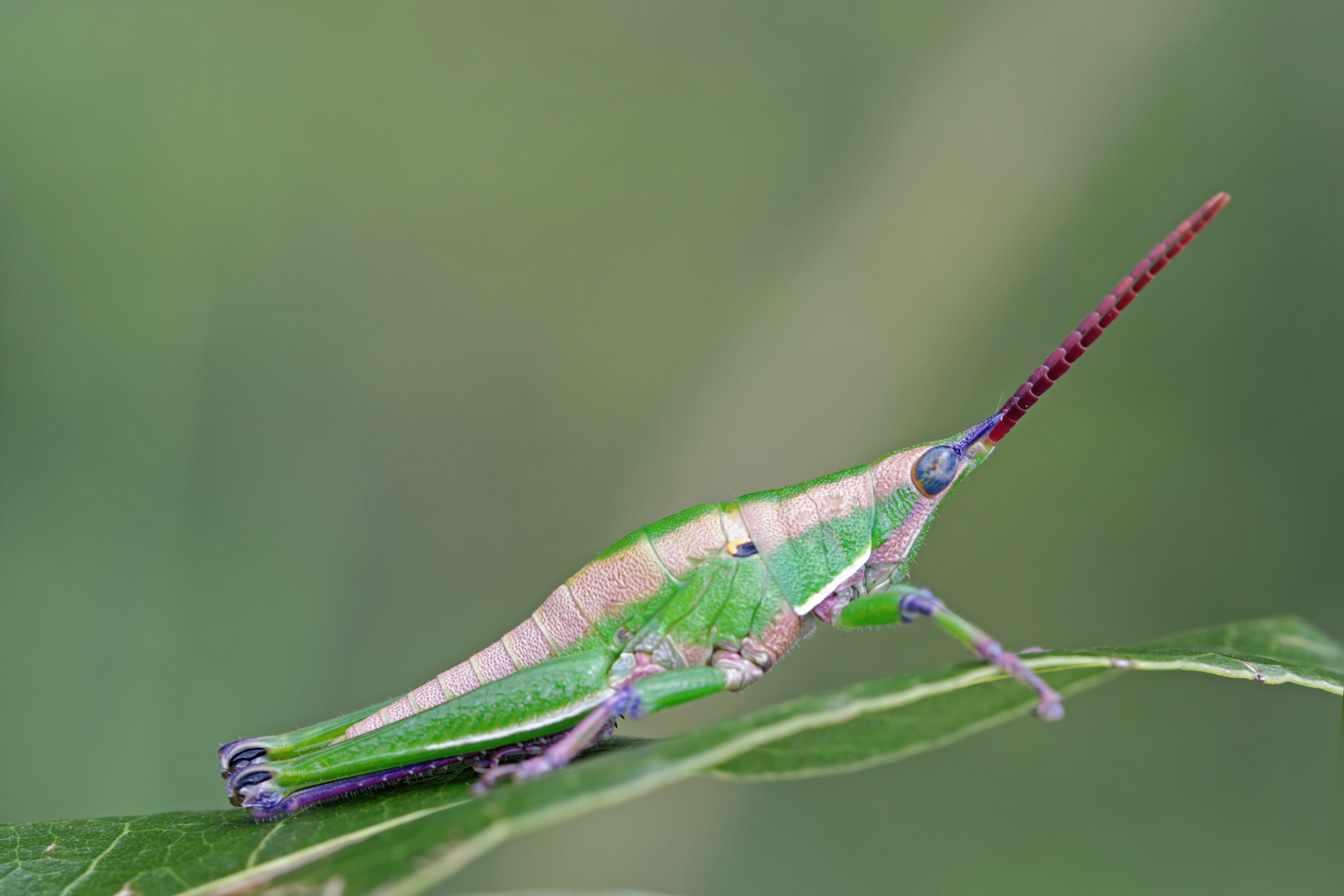
Caprorhinus ranohirae, Madagascar

1. Ambositracris Dirsh, 1963
2. Caprorhinus Saussure, 1899
3. Dyscolorhinus Saussure, 1899
4. Pseudosphena Kevan & Akbar, 1964
5. Vittisphena Kevan, 1956

genus group Orthacris

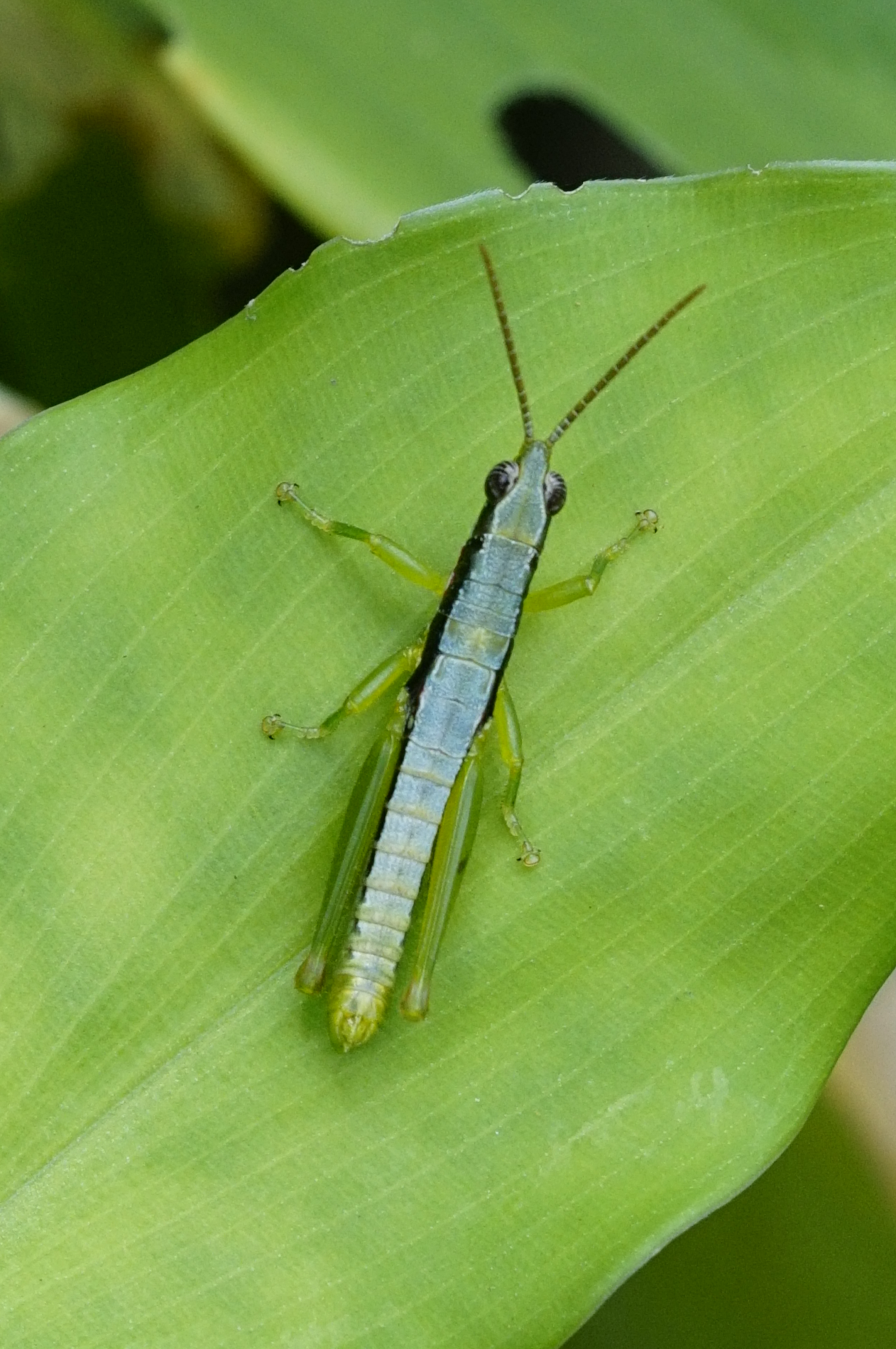
Neorthacris sp.

1. Burmorthacris Kevan, Singh & Akbar, 1964
2. Kuantania Miller, 1935
3. Neorthacris Kevan & Singh, 1964
4. Orthacris Bolívar, 1884
5. Rakwana (insect) Henry, 1933

incertae sedis

- Acropyrgus Descamps & Wintrebert, 1966 - monotypic:
  - Acropyrgus cadeti Descamps & Wintrebert, 1966 (Madagascar)

=== Popoviini ===
Auth.: Kevan & Akbar, 1964 - E. Africa to India

1. Colemania Bolívar, 1910
2. Nilgiracris Kevan, 1964
3. Parorthacris Dirsh, 1958
4. Popovia Uvarov, 1952
5. Ramakrishnaia Bolívar, 1917

=== Tribes P-Z ===
- Tribe Psednurini Burr, 1904 - Australia
  - Genus Propsednura Rehn, 1953
  - Genus Psedna Key, 1972
  - Genus Psednura Burr, 1904
- Tribe Sagittacridini Descamps & Wintrebert, 1966 - Madagascar
  - Genus Acanthopyrgus Descamps & Wintrebert, 1966
  - Genus Sagittacris Dirsh, 1963
- Tribe Verduliini Kevan & Akbar, 1964 - Philippines to PNG
  - Genus Verdulia Bolívar, 1905
  - Genus Meubelia Willemse, 1932
  - Genus Philippyrgus Kevan, 1974
  - Genus Spinacris Willemse, 1933
