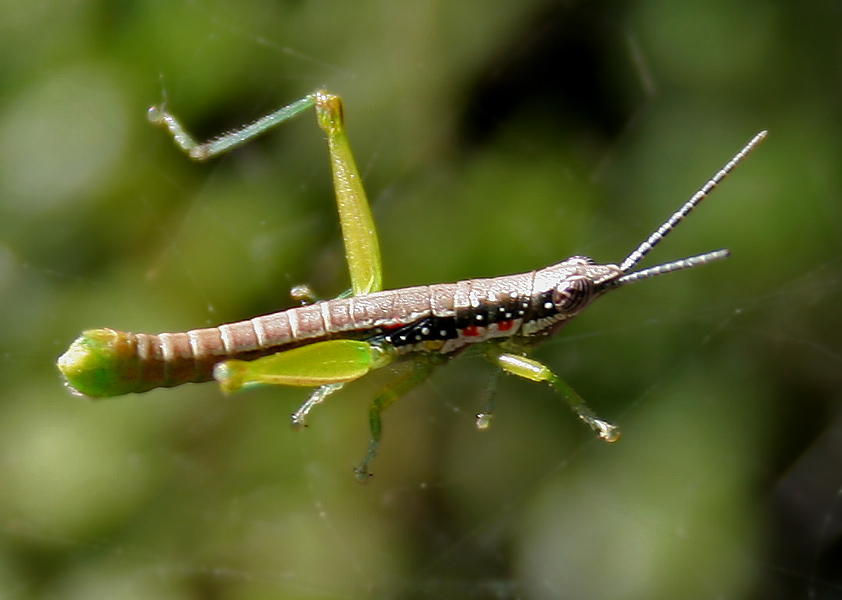
- Orthacris sp.

Scientific classification
- Domain: Eukaryota
- Kingdom: Animalia
- Phylum: Arthropoda
- Class: Insecta
- Order: Orthoptera
- Suborder: Caelifera
- Family: Pyrgomorphidae
- Subfamily: Orthacridinae
- Tribe: Orthacridini
- Informal group: Orthacris group
- Genus: Orthacris; Serville, 1838

= Orthacris =

Genus of grasshoppers

Orthacris is a genus of grasshoppers in the family Pyrgomorphidae and the subfamily Orthacridinae. Species are found in the Indian subcontinent including Sri Lanka.

== Species ==
The Catalogue of Life and Orthoptera Species File list the following:

- Orthacris ceylonica Kirby, 1914
- Orthacris comorensis Singh & Kevan, 1965
- Orthacris curvicerca Kevan, 1953
- Orthacris elongata Kevan, 1953
- Orthacris filiformis Bolívar, 1884
- Orthacris gracilis Kevan, 1953
- Orthacris maindroni Bolívar, 1905
- Orthacris major Kevan, 1953
- Orthacris elegans Bolívar, 1902
- Orthacris incongruens Carl, 1916
- Orthacris ramakrishnai Bolívar, 1917
- Orthacris robusta Kevan, 1953
- Orthacris ruficornis Bolívar, 1902

== Gallery ==
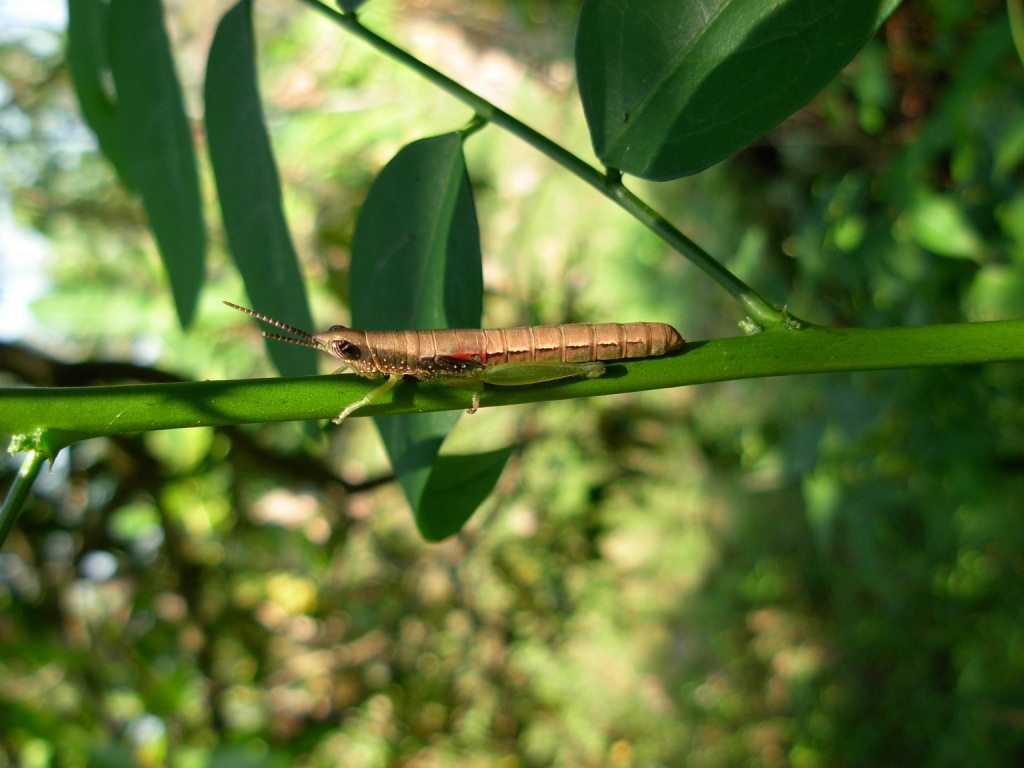

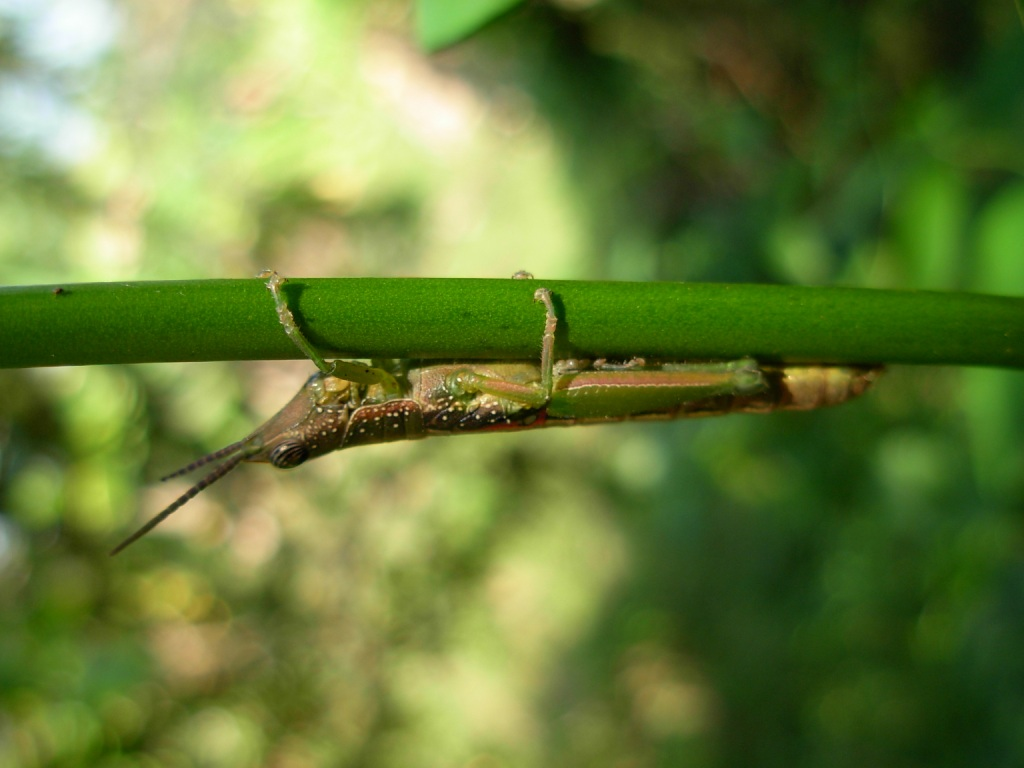

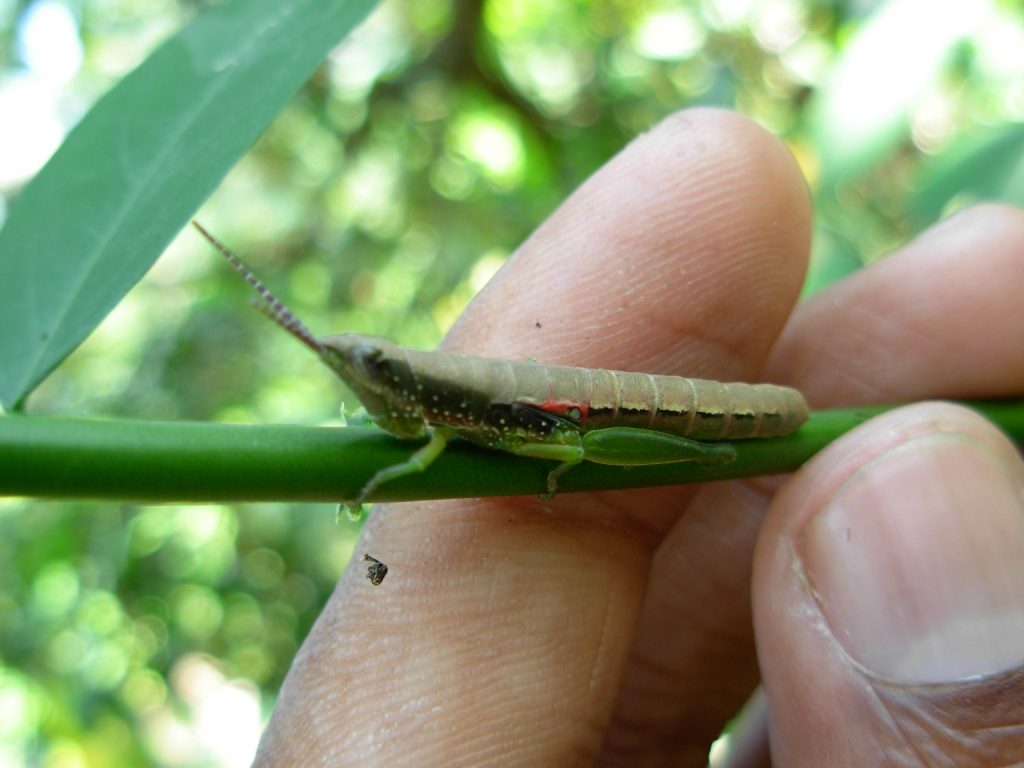

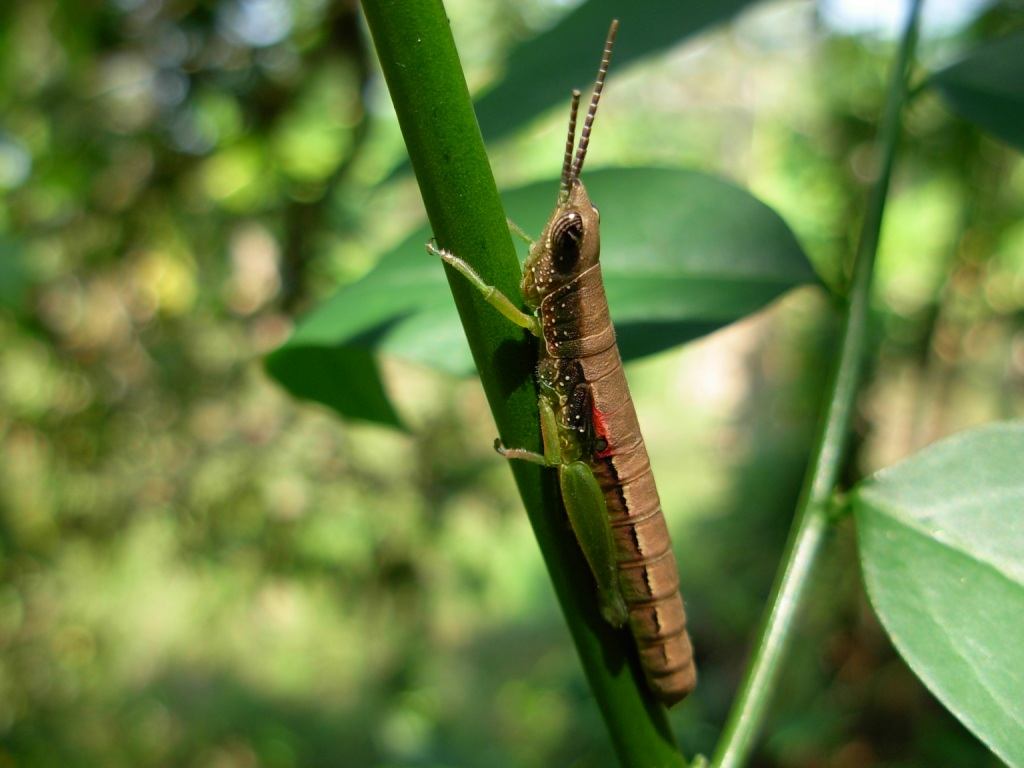
