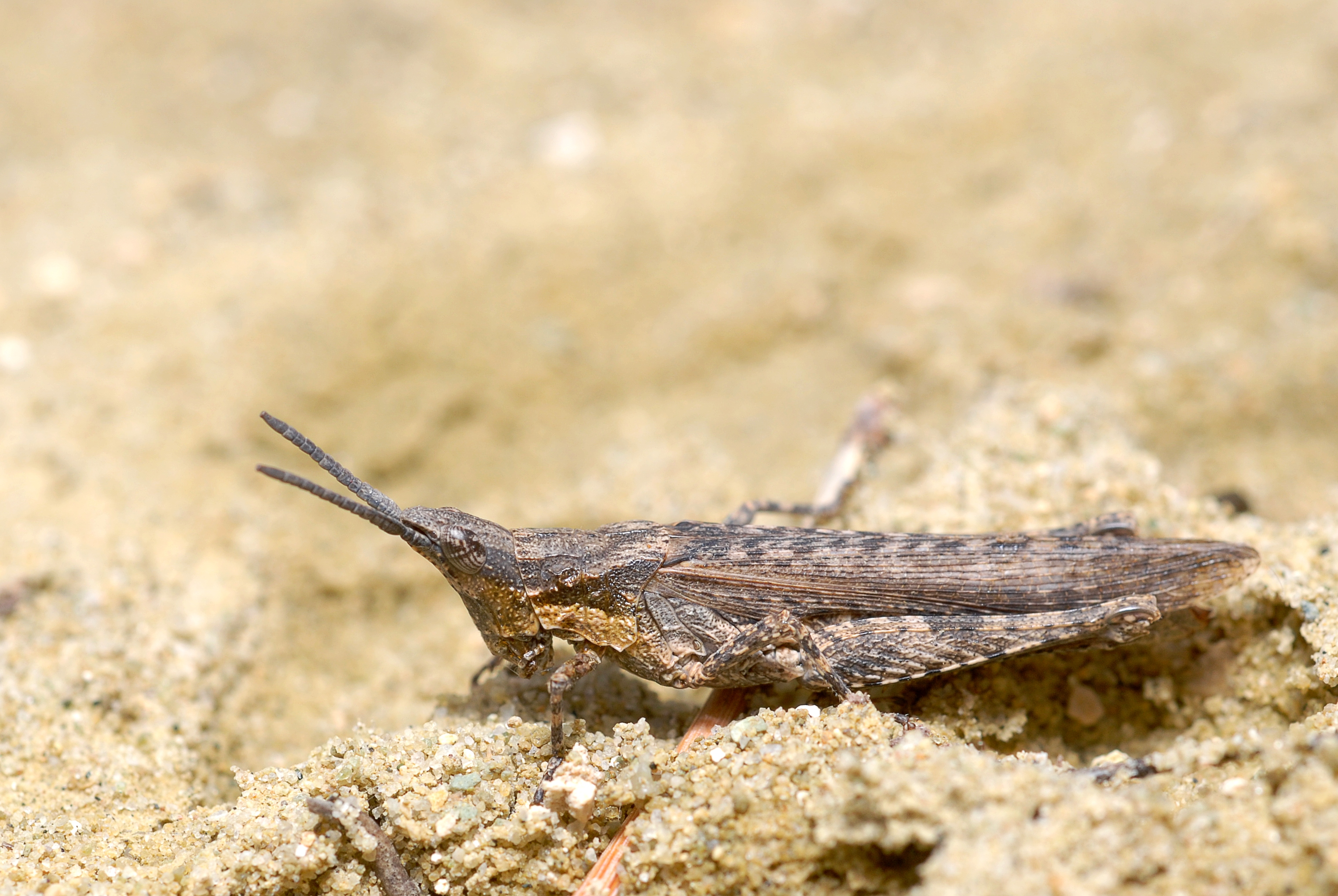
- Pyrgomorpha conica, a well-camouflaged species
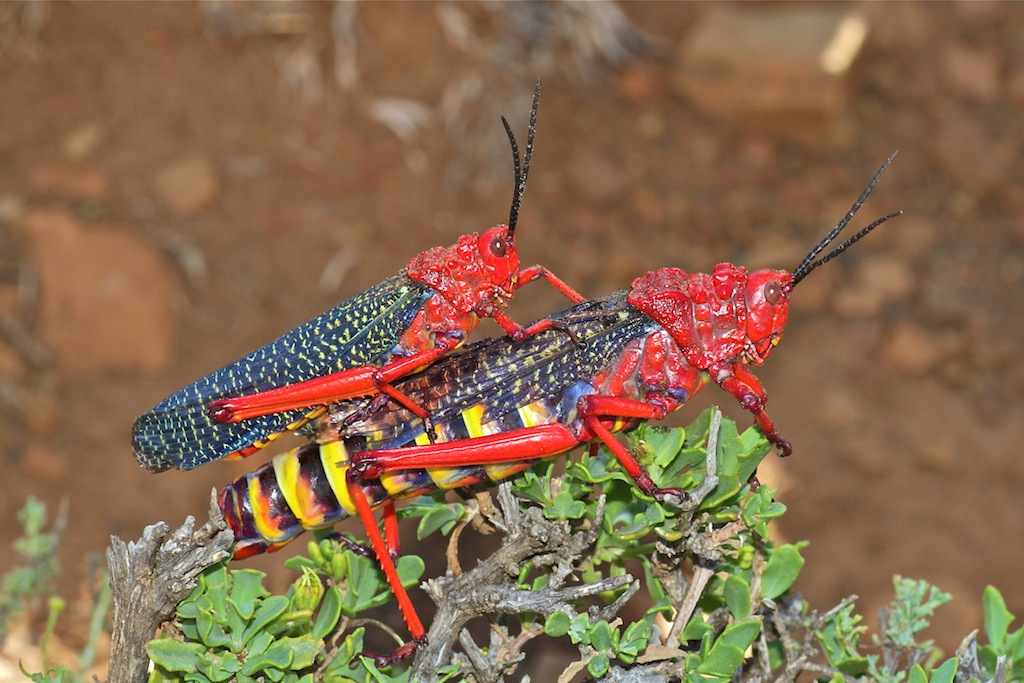
- Phymateus morbillosus, a toxic species with bright warning colours

Scientific classification
- Kingdom: Animalia
- Phylum: Arthropoda
- Clade: Pancrustacea
- Class: Insecta
- Order: Orthoptera
- Suborder: Caelifera
- Superfamily: Pyrgomorphoidea
- Family: Pyrgomorphidae; Brunner von Wattenwyl, 1874

Subfamilies and Tribes
- See text

= Pyrgomorphidae =

Family of grasshoppers

Pyrgomorphidae is a family of grasshoppers in the order Orthoptera; it is the only family in the superfamily Pyrgomorphoidea. Pyrgomorphidae are found worldwide in tropical and warm temperate regions (though none are from US mainland), but the vast majority of the family's approximately 500 species are from Africa, Asia and Australia. Their name is probably derived from pyrgos (Greek: Πύργος) meaning "tower": a reference to the form (morph) of the head in the type genus Pyrgomorpha and other genera.

They may sometimes be known as "gaudy grasshoppers", due to the striking, bright aposematic colouration of a number of genera, warning of their toxicity. However, about 90% of the species in the family are harmless and well-camouflaged, with a few, notably Sphenarium, even caught for human consumption.

== Subfamilies and tribes ==
Incomplete list of genera and species:

=== Subfamily Orthacridinae ===
All tribes and selected genera only are shown here:

- Tribe Brunniellini Kevan, 1963 - Philippines
- Tribe Chapmanacridini Kevan & Akbar, 1964 - W. Africa
- Tribe Fijipyrgini Kevan, 1966 - Fiji
- Tribe Geloiini Bolívar, 1905 - Madagascar
- Tribe Gymnohippini Kevan & Akbar, 1964 - Madagascar
- Tribe Ichthiacridini Kevan, Singh & Akbar, 1964 - Mexico
- Tribe Ichthyotettigini Kevan, Singh & Akbar, 1964 - Mexico
- Tribe Malagasphenini Kevan & Akbar, 1964 - Madagascar
- Tribe Mitricephalini Kevan & Akbar, 1964 - Malesia
- Tribe Nereniini Kevan, 1964 - Vietnam, PNG
  - Genus Nerenia: Nerenia francoisi Bolívar, 1905 (monotypic)
  - Genus Megradina: Megradina festiva Storozhenko, 2004 (monotypic)
- Tribe Orthacridini Bolívar, 1905 - E. Africa, Madagascar, India, Indo-China

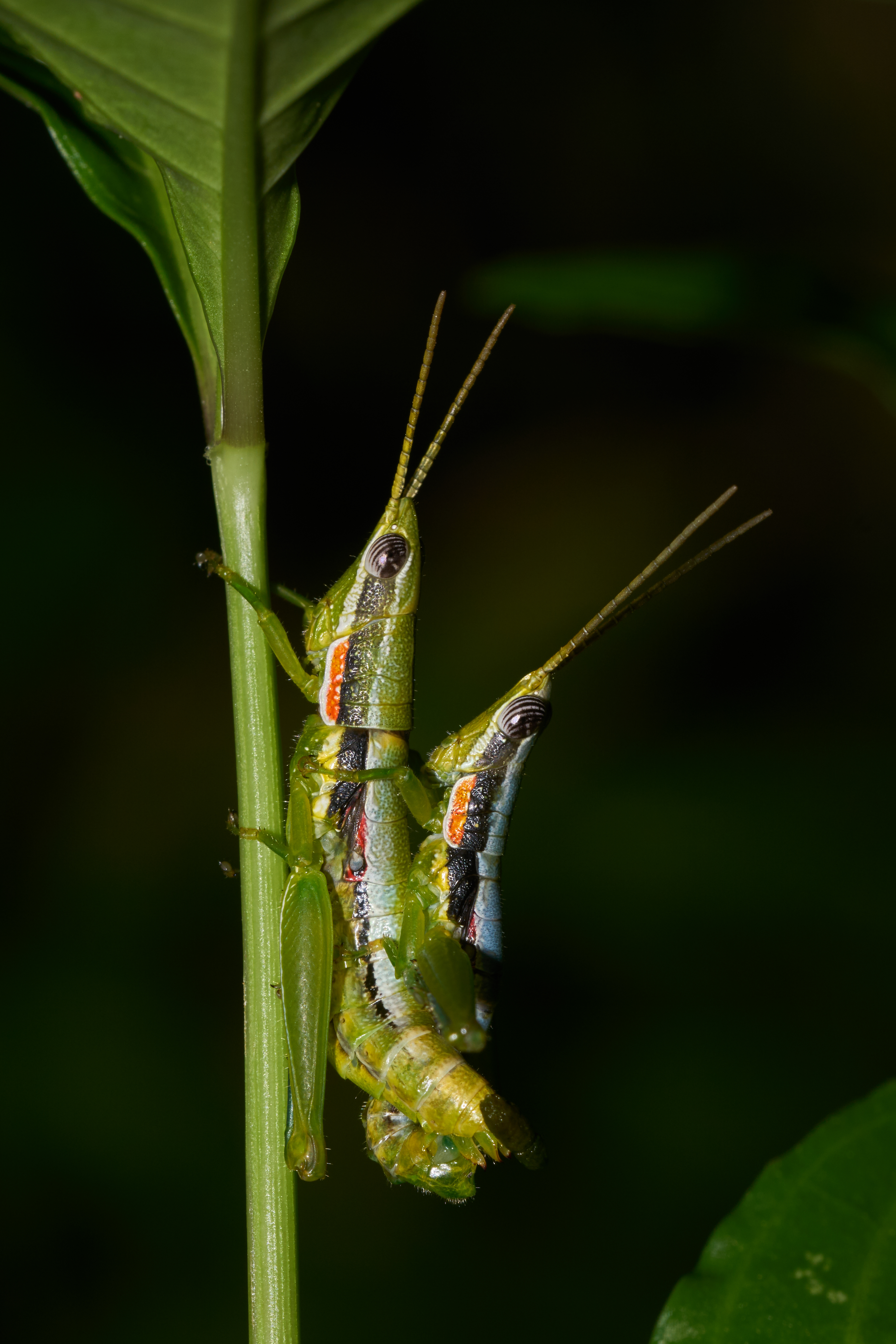
Neorthacris simulans at Kadavoor, Kerala, India

  - Genus Kuantania Miller, 1935
  - Genus Neorthacris Kevan & Singh, 1964
  - Genus Orthacris Bolívar, 1884
- Tribe Popoviini Kevan & Akbar, 1964 - E. Africa to India
  - Genus Popovia Uvarov, 1952
- Tribe Psednurini Burr, 1904 - Australia
- Tribe Sagittacridini Descamps & Wintrebert, 1966 - Madagascar
- Tribe Verduliini Kevan & Akbar, 1964 - Philippines to PNG

=== Subfamily Pyrgomorphinae ===
Some notable genera and species are shown here:

- Tribe Atractomorphini - Africa, Asia, Australia

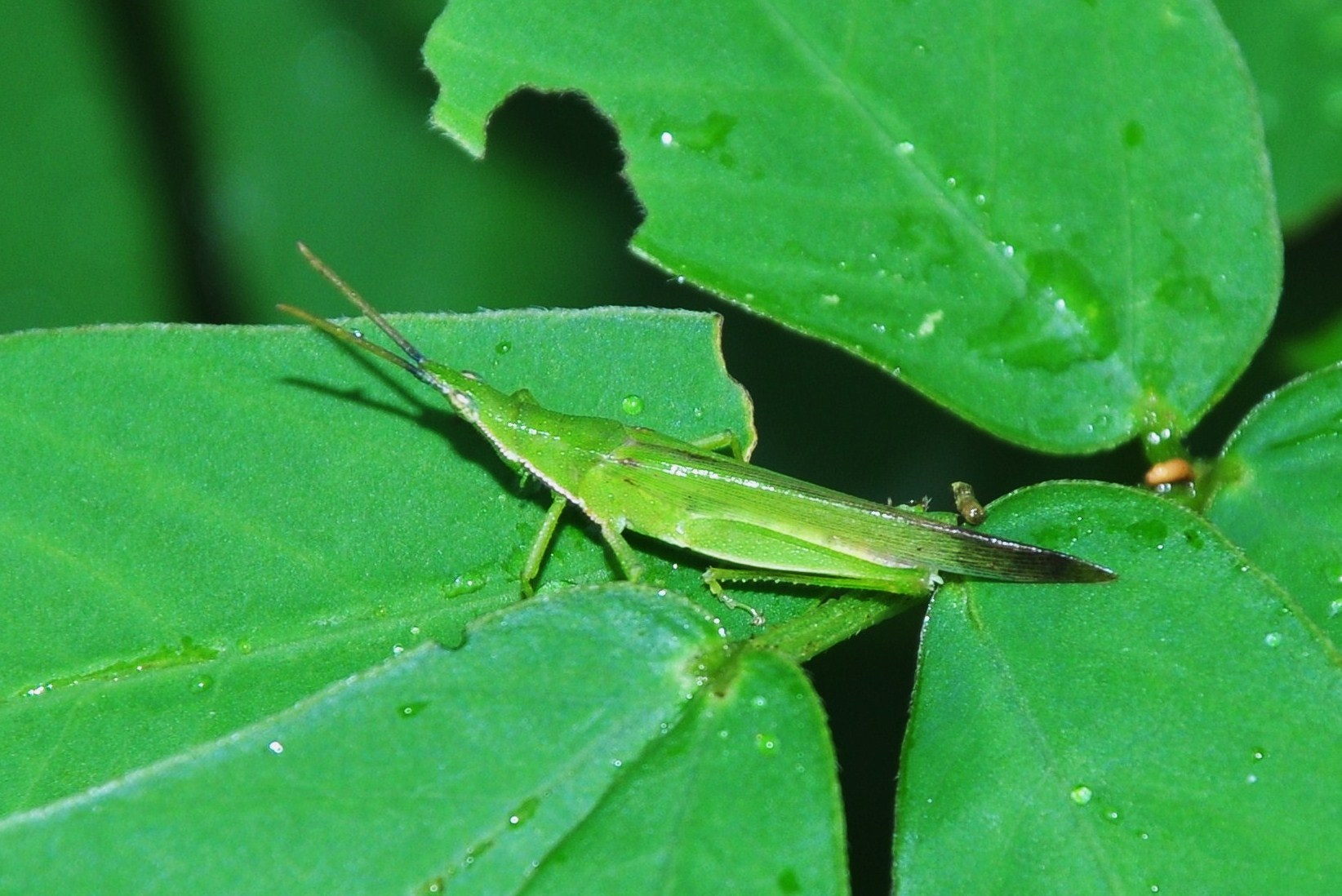
Atractomorpha similis

  - Genus Atractomorpha
- Tribe Chlorizeinini Kevan & Akbar, 1964 - Africa, Asia
  - Genus Chlorizeina Brunner von Wattenwyl, 1893
- Tribe Chrotogonini Bolívar, 1904 - Africa, Asia
- Tribe Desmopterini - W. Africa, Asia, Australia
  - Genus Desmoptera: including Desmoptera truncatipennis
- Tribe Dictyophorini - Africa

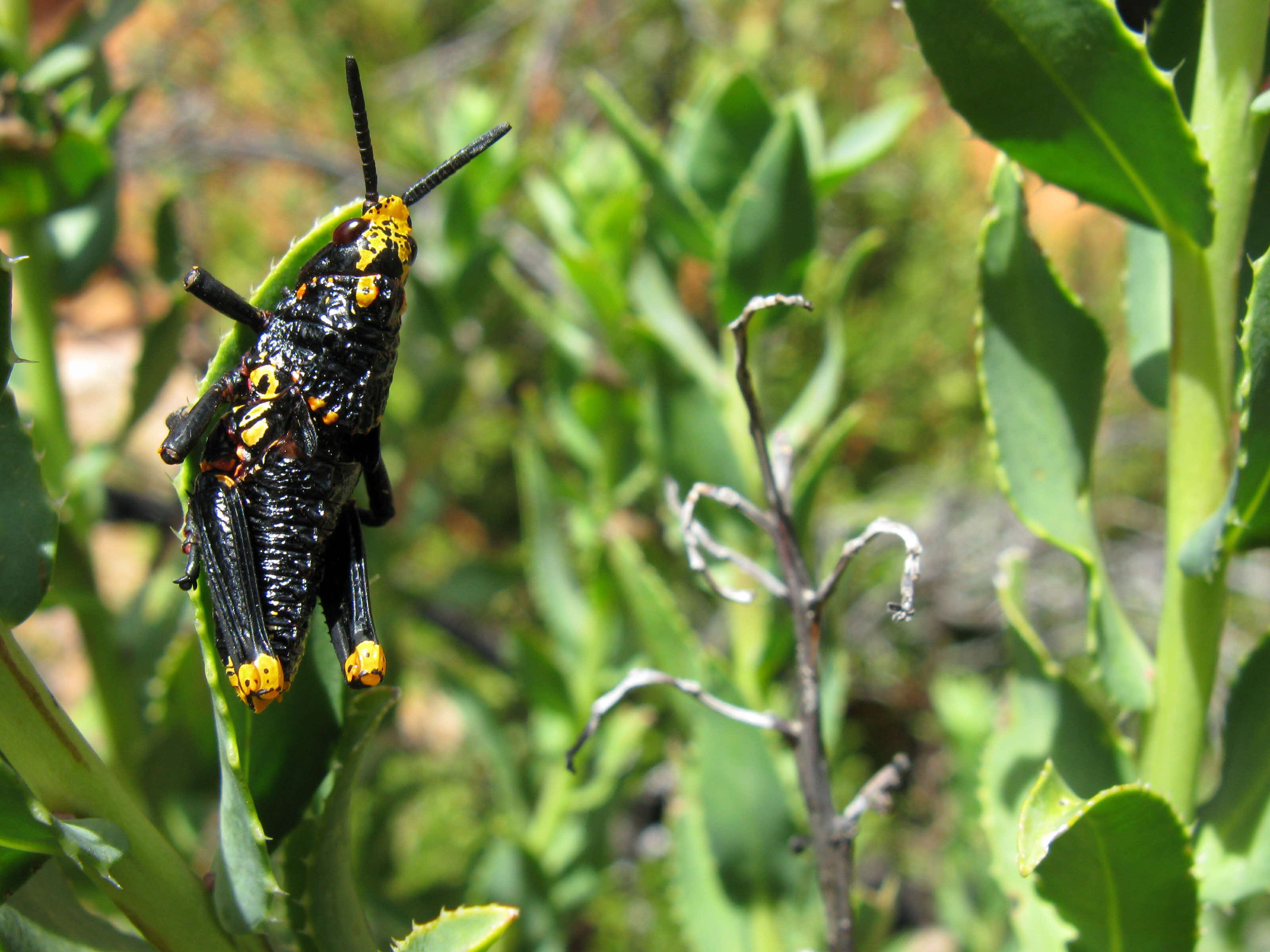
Immature Dictyophorus spumans Cedarberg South Africa

  - Genus Dictyophorus: including Dictyophorus spumans
- Tribe Monistriini - Australia
  - Genus Monistria: including Monistria cicatricosa
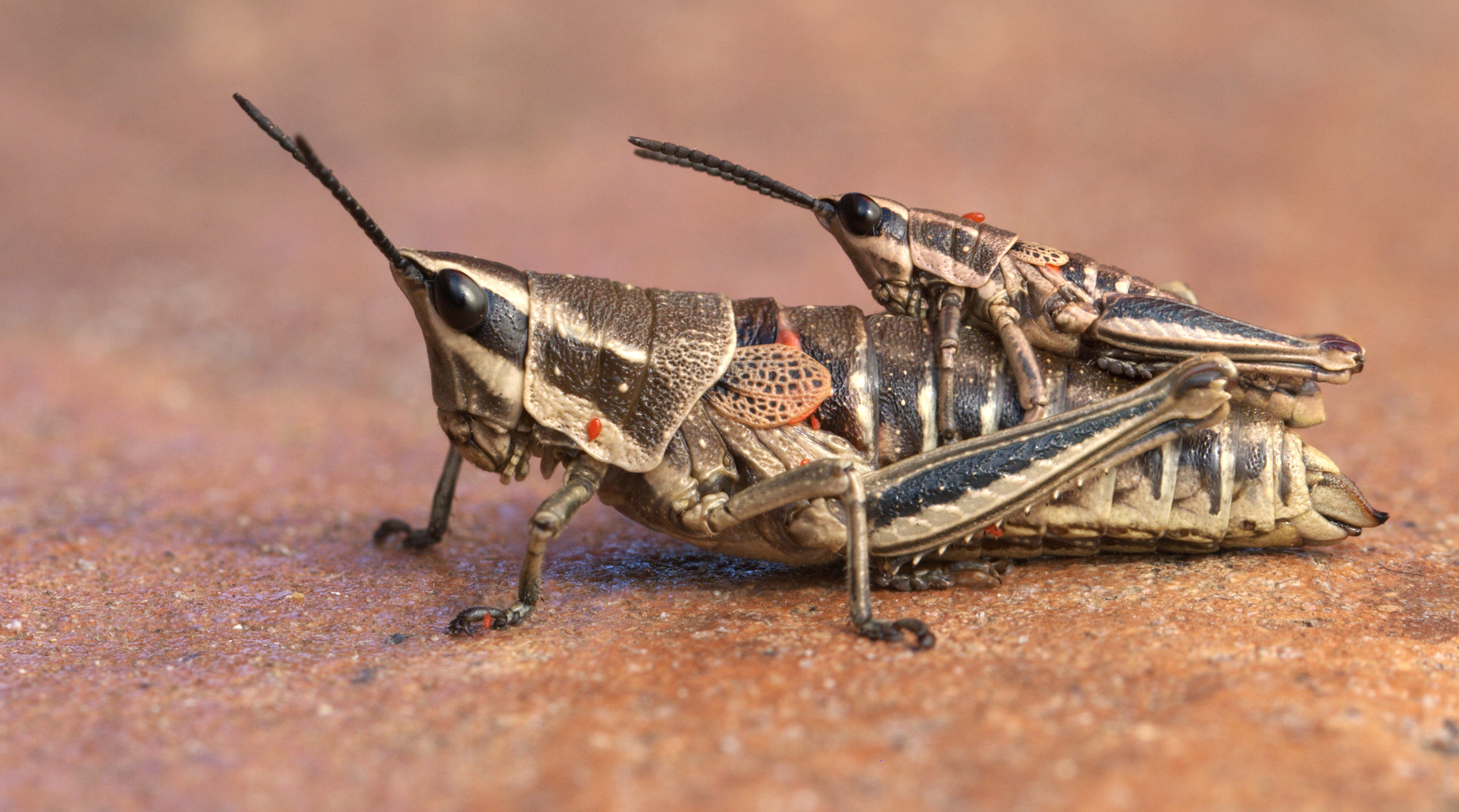
    Monistria concinna
    and Monistria pustulifera
- Tribe Omurini Kevan, 1961 - South America
- Tribe Petasidini - Australia
  - Genus Petasida: including Petasida ephippigera (Leichhardt's grasshopper)
- Tribe Phymateini - Africa (incl. Madagascar), China

Phymateus morbillosus. Male. Common milkweed locust photographed in thorn tree (African acacia sp.) at Sterkfontein

  - Genus Phymateus
  - Genus Zonocerus
- Tribe Poekilocerini Burmeister, 1840 - Africa, India, Indo-China, Malesia, PNG
  - Genus Poekilocerus Serville, 1831
- Tribe Psednurini - Australia
  - Genus Psednura
- Tribe Pseudomorphacridini Kevan & Akbar, 1964 - Indo-China
  - Genus Pseudomorphacris Carl, 1916
- Tribe Pyrgomorphini - Africa, W. Asia through to India
  - Genus Parasphena Bolívar, 1884
  - Genus Pyrgomorpha Serville, 1838
  - Genus Pyrgomorphella Bolívar, 1904
- Tribe Schulthessiini Kevan & Akbar, 1964 - Madagascar
- Tribe Sphenariini Bolívar, 1884 - Central America, Africa, China
  - Genus Sphenarium Charpentier, 1845
- Tribe Tagastini Bolívar, 1905 - SE Asia
  - Genus Tagasta Bolívar, 1905
- Tribe Taphronotini Bolívar, 1904 - Africa, India, Indo-China
  - Genus Aularches Stål, 1873: monotypic Aularches miliaris
