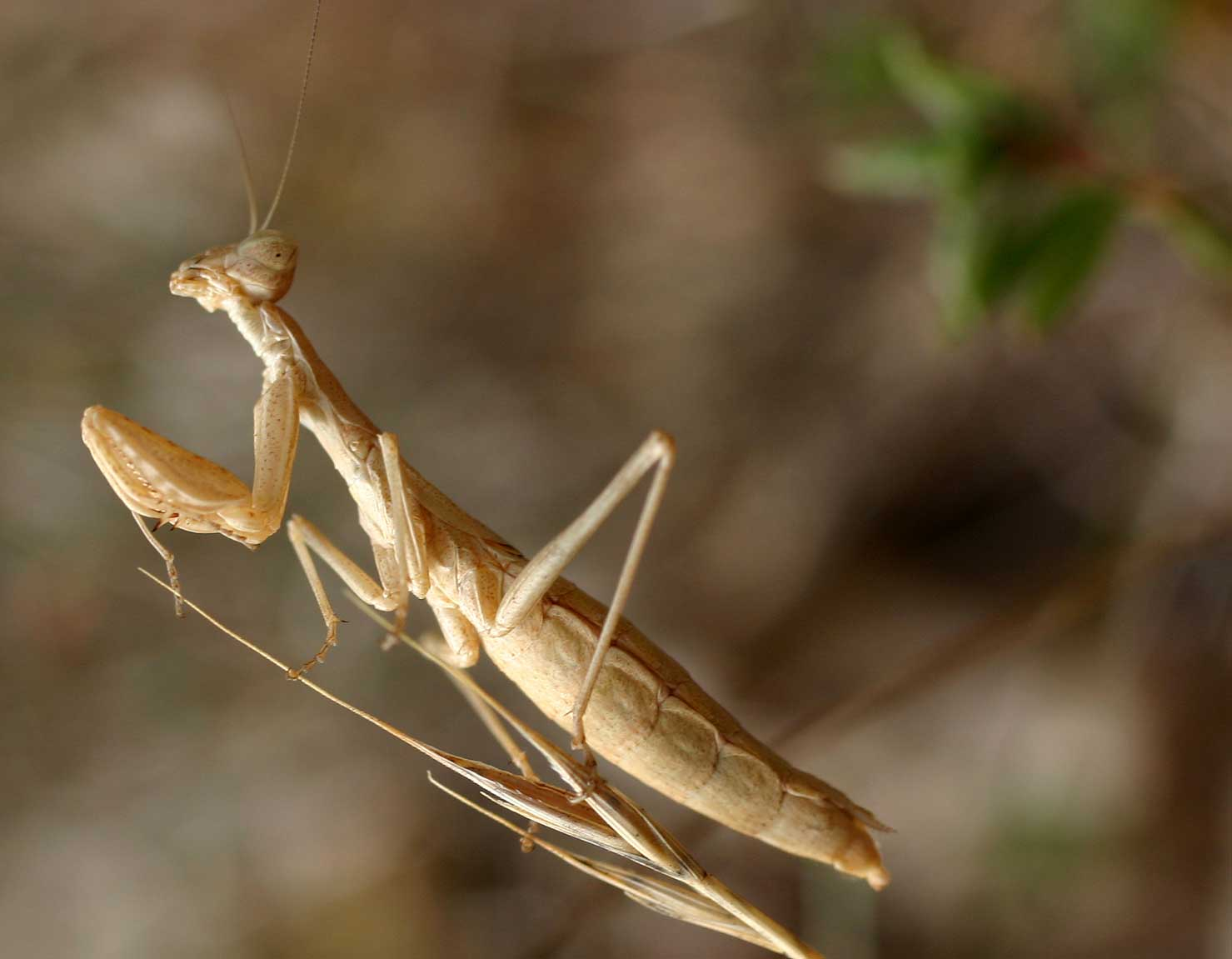
- A. decolor

Conservation status
- Least Concern (IUCN 3.1)

Scientific classification
- Kingdom: Animalia
- Phylum: Arthropoda
- Clade: Pancrustacea
- Class: Insecta
- Order: Mantodea
- Family: Amelidae
- Genus: Ameles
- Species: A. decolor

Binomial name
- Ameles decolor (Charpentier, 1825)

Synonyms
- Mantis abjecta (Domenico Cyrillo, 1787); Mantis decolor (Toussaint von Charpentier, 1825); Harpax decolor (Pierre-Hippolyte Lucas, 1849)

= Ameles decolor =

Species of praying mantis

Ameles decolor (also known as the Mediterranean dwarf mantis or the dwarf mantis) is a species of small praying mantis native to the west Mediterranean and North Africa. A. decolor was first described by entomologist Domenico Cyrillo in 1787, and its current classification was established in 1976 by Karl Harz and Alfred Peter Kaltenbach. A. decolor presents as a small, light brown mantis with females tending to appear larger than their male counterparts. The mating patterns of A. decolor are considered some of the most complex amongst praying mantises, with males presenting two different styles of courtship. Their habitat favours shrublands, grasslands, and wooded areas.

== Taxonomy ==
A. decolor is a species of praying mantis within the Amelidae family. A. decolor was first described as Mantis abjecta by the entomologist Domenico Cyrillo in 1787, but this classification was not formally recognized. In 1825, Toussaint von Charpentier formally classified the species as Mantis decolor. In 1849, Pierre-Hippolyte Lucas reclassified the species as Harpax decolor, and in 1976, German entomologists Karl Harz and Alfred Peter Kaltenbach reclassified the species again as Ameles decolor. Since then, entomologists Paolo Fontana, Reinhard Ehrmann, and Barbara Agabiti have all upheld this classification.

== Description ==
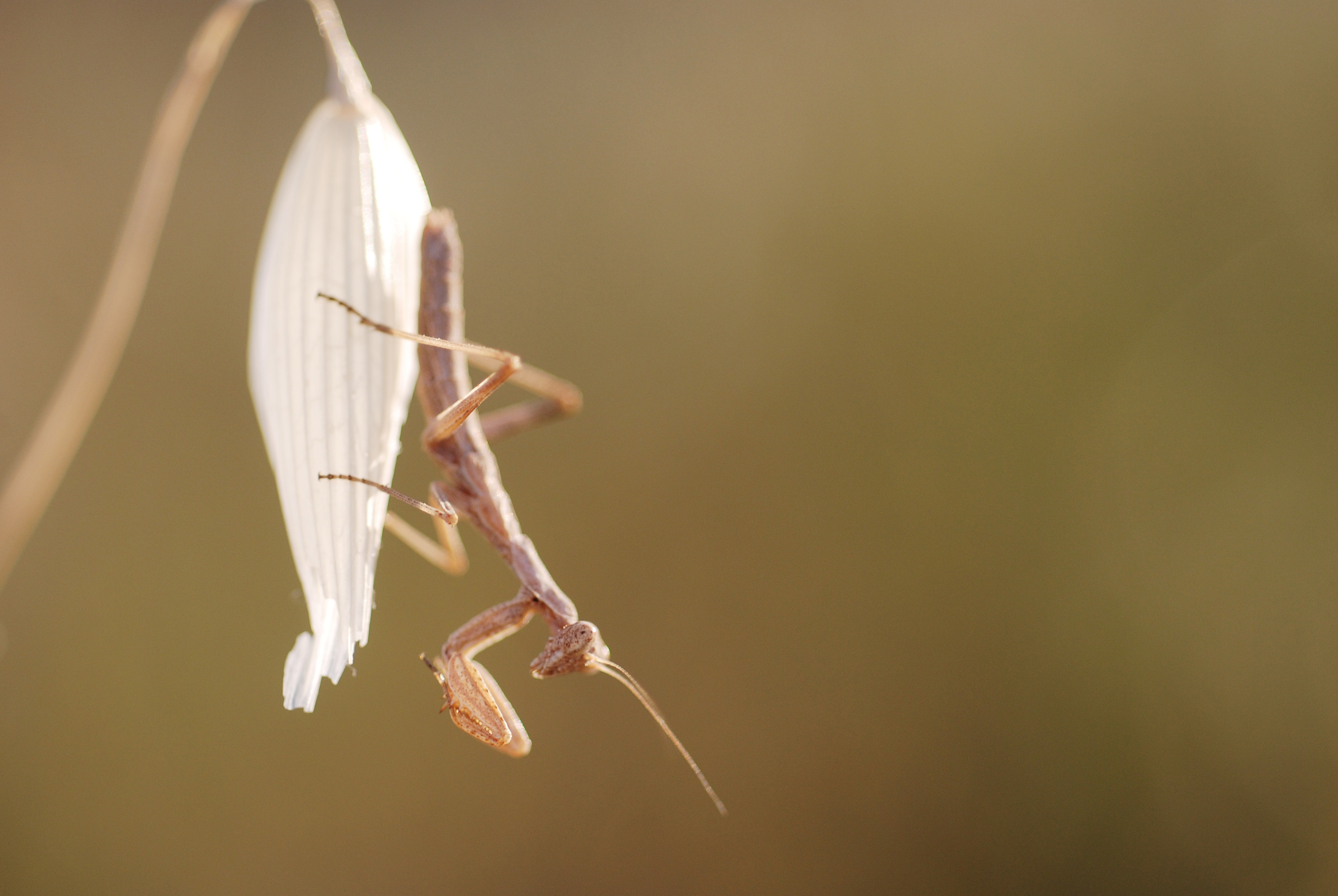
A larval stage of A. decolor hanging from a flower in Belgium

A. decolor is considered a small praying mantis. Males measure from 18 millimetres (0.71 in) to 27 millimetres (1.1 in) and females are slightly larger, measuring 19 millimetres (0.75 in) to 28 millimetres (1.1 in). The pronotum (prothorax) is slender and the abdomen is cylindrical. The eyes and body are an ochre colour and the eyes sometimes present with a tubercle on their apical end. Males and females both share a similar head width and eye structure, with the main difference being that females' eyes are angled upward. The tegmina (leathery front wings) for the males extend past the sub-genital plate and feature a narrow white stripe. Female front wings only extend to the distal end of the urotergite, making their wings substantially shorter than the males. Along the thorax, males have hair that females lack. Similarly, the posterior and middle legs in males have dense hairs while females' legs are only slightly hairy. Females present with longer femur, and tibiae, and their anterior legs are significantly larger. The abdomen of males is cylindrical with wide urosternites. Males also present with external genitalia. The abdomen of females is longer and narrower then males.

A. decolor is often mistaken for Ameles heldreichi; these species are differentiated by A. heldreichi's rounder eyes and genitalia. A. decolor is also similar to Ameles massai and is differentiated by its longer tegmin, shorter pronotum, and differing genital shape.

== Life cycle ==
=== Mating ===
The courtship behaviour of A. decolor is considered one of the most complex within the mantis order. When mating, males begin with a pattern of abdominal movements while performing a lateral "boxing" (side-to-side motion) with their prothoracic legs. A. decolor also performs a series of stamping movements with their metathoracic legs, although it is unknown if these movements are connected to courtship behaviour or incidentally occur. Individual components of A. decolor's ritual have been observed in Tenodera aridifolia sinensis and Oxypilus hamatus during their mating rituals. Tenodera aridifolia has been observed to engage in a similar mating ritual, indicating both a common ancestor and that the behaviour originated when the species' ancestors diverged. Females have been observed performing deimatic (startle) displays during courtship.

Males follow two separate approaches when courting females. The first approach, the "vigorous approach", involves fast rotation of the forelegs and a wide bend in the abdomen. The second approach, the "shy approach", involves slowly moving towards a female with slow, side-to-side oscillations in the forelegs. This shy approach has been observed in other species of mantis. It has been theorized that, since mantises observe slow objects as further away, males may engage in "shy" behaviour as a way to avoid predation by the larger females. During their approach, males tap the ground to indicate a desire to mate, and once they have closed the distance, males spread their forelegs and enlarge themselves. This discourages an attack by the female. Sexual cannibalism has been observed in the species but only before the initiation of courtship rituals, indicating that courtship significantly decreases the risk of the males being consumed. Cannibalism outside of sexual encounters has also been observed in A. decolor. When coupling, the male makes a flying leap onto the female's back, engaging in mating movements similar to that seen in Tenodera aridifolia. During mating, males often tap antennae to calm the female and other males may attempt to uncouple mating pairs and mate with the female themselves.

=== Life cycle stages ===
Egg masses are always found deposited under stones. Once hatched, A. decolor undergoes an incomplete metamorphosis, beginning with nymph stages which are commonly brachypterous (short winged). Females remain brachypterous throughout their life while males develop full wings. A. decolor generally reaches adulthood in around July and survives to October.

== Distribution ==
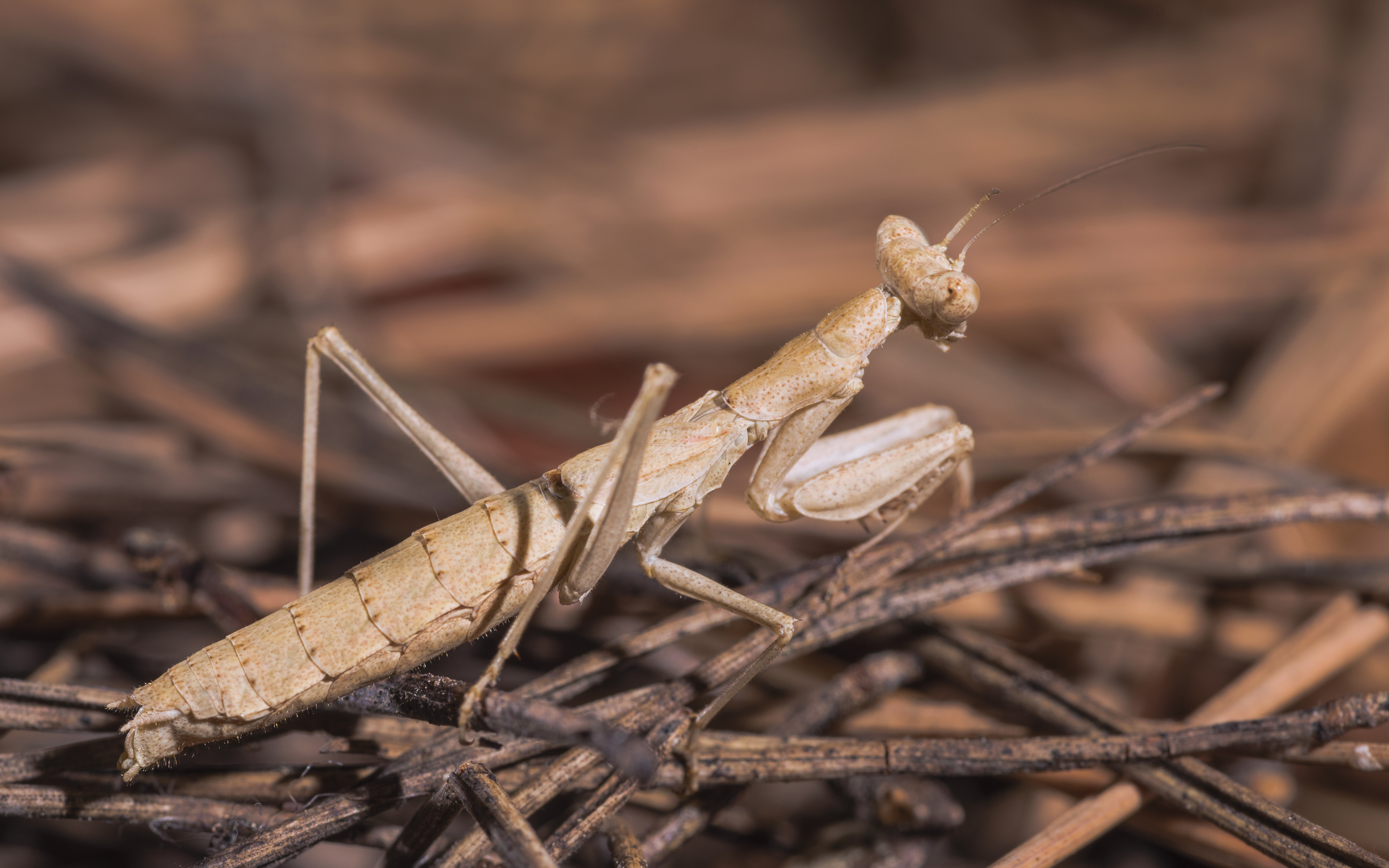
An immature Ameles decolor female

=== Range ===
A. decolor is native to the Mediterranean basin, and can range from central Europe to northern Africa. Specifically, A. decolor is native to Albania, Algeria, Greece, Italy (including Sardinia), Libya, Montenegro, Spain, France, Sicily, Tunisia, and the Ionian Islands. Estimates by the International Union for Conservation of Nature place the minimum total native range of A. decolor at approximately 870,000 km^{2} (335909 mi^{2}). In 2018, it was confirmed that A. decolor was native to the coastal regions of Slovenia and Croatia, specifically along the Dragonja river. It is still debated if A. decolor is native to Malta's islands, as there are only two accounts of it being present within the archipelago.

=== Habitat ===
A. decolor is most commonly found in herbaceous vegetation and wooded areas including: grasslands, arid fields, maquis shrubland, and garrigue shrubland.

== Evolution ==
It has been proposed that A. decolor, A. heldreichi, A. dumonti, A. aegyptiaca, and A. syriensis all arose in the region surrounding the Adriatic Sea, with A. decolor and A. decolor evolving prior to the Tertiary. Following this, A. decolor migrated west, likely during the Pliocene, moving as far as Spain. In the Miocene, marine regression within the Mediterranean allowed A. decolor to migrate to Sicily.

The following cladogram shows the phylogenetic position of A. decolor among select members of the Ameles genus, based upon comparison of 21 morphological characteristics across the Ameles genus:

- Ameles
  - other species
  - - - - A. syriensis
        - A. aegyptiaca
      - before Tertiary
        - - A. dumonti
          - A. heldreichi
        - A. decolor
