= Ground mantis =

Common name for several praying mantises

Ground mantis is a common name given to various species of praying mantis believed to hunt on or near ground level rather than high amid foliage.

Examples native to North America include:

- Litaneutria minor — minor ground mantis
- Litaneutria skinneri — Skinner's ground mantis
- Yersiniops solitaria — horned ground mantis
- Yersiniops sophronica — Yersin's ground mantis

== See also ==
- List of mantis genera and species
- Mantises of North America
- Dead leaf mantis
- Flower mantis
- Grass mantis
- Leaf mantis
- Shield mantis
- Stick mantis
