= A. aegyptyiaca =

A. aegyptiaca may refer to:

- Abra aegyptiaca, a saltwater clam in the genus Abra
- Achillea aegyptiaca, the Egyptian yarrow, an ornamental plant native to Greece
- Alopochen aegyptiaca, the Egyptian goose, a bird native to Africa
- Ameles aegyptiaca, a praying mantis native to Egypt
- Arundo aegyptiaca, a synonym of Arundo donax, a plant native to the Greater Middle East
