= Khaoyaiana =

Scientific classification
- Domain: Eukaryota
- Kingdom: Animalia
- Phylum: Arthropoda
- Class: Insecta
- Order: Orthoptera
- Suborder: Ensifera
- Family: Tettigoniidae
- Subfamily: Phaneropterinae
- Genus: Khaoyaiana; Ingrisch, 1990
- Species: K. ambigua

Binomial name
- Khaoyaiana ambigua (Bolívar, 1900)

Synonyms
- Species synonymy: Turpilia ambigua Bolívar, 1900; Diplophyllus ambigua (Bolívar, 1900); Khaoyaiana nitens Ingrisch, 1990

Genus of bush-crickets

Khaoyaiana is a monotypic genus of Asian sickle-bearing bush-crickets, not placed in any tribe; it was erected by Sigfrid Ingrisch in 1990.

== Species ==
The species Khaoyaiana ambigua was originally described by Ignacio Bolívar as Turpilia ambigua from Indian specimens. The recorded distribution is India and Thailand. The current accepted name is also known by the synonym Khaoyaiana nitens.
