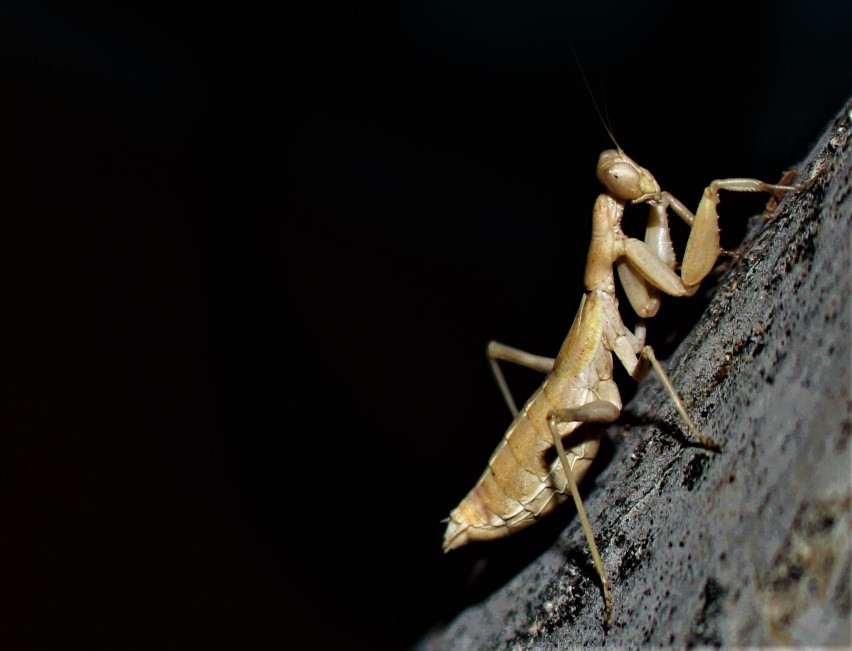
- Female imago, Iran

Scientific classification
- Kingdom: Animalia
- Phylum: Arthropoda
- Clade: Pancrustacea
- Class: Insecta
- Order: Mantodea
- Family: Amelidae
- Genus: Ameles
- Species: A. persa

Binomial name
- Ameles persa Bolivar, 1911

= Ameles persa =

Species of praying mantis

Ameles persa is a species of praying mantis found in Afghanistan and Iran. Ameles crassinervis, which was previously thought to be a separate species, was synonymised in 2011.
