= Ameles assoi =

Conservation status
- Data Deficient (IUCN 3.1)

Scientific classification
- Kingdom: Animalia
- Phylum: Arthropoda
- Clade: Pancrustacea
- Class: Insecta
- Order: Mantodea
- Family: Amelidae
- Genus: Ameles
- Species: A. assoi

Binomial name
- Ameles assoi Bolivar, 1873

Species of praying mantis

Ameles assoi is a species of praying mantis native to Morocco, Tunisia, and Spain.
