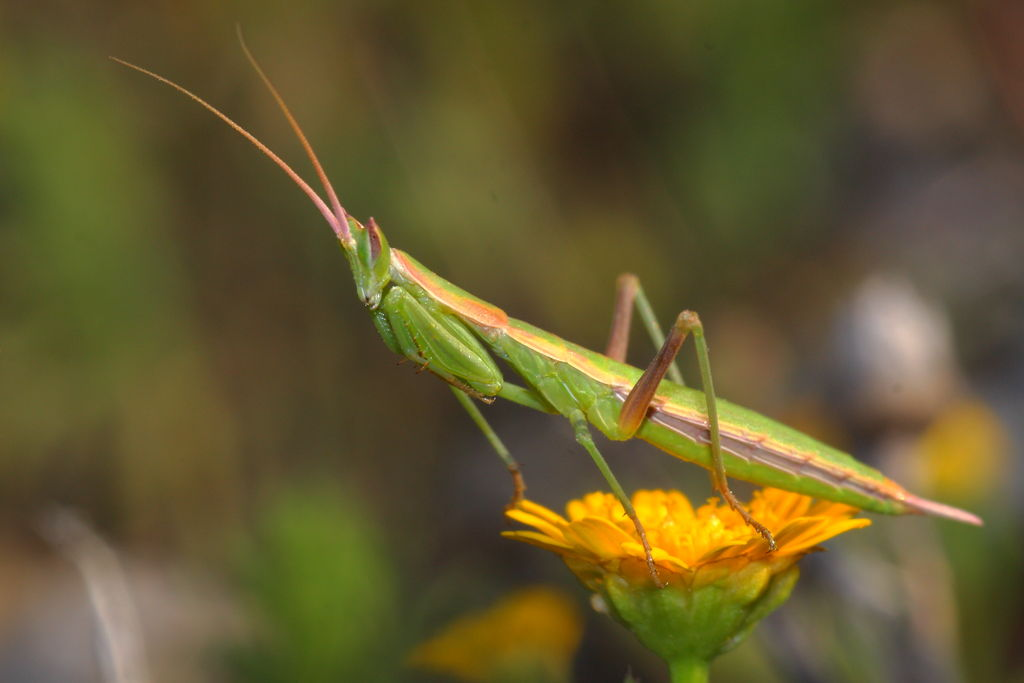

Conservation status
- Least Concern (IUCN 3.1)

Scientific classification
- Kingdom: Animalia
- Phylum: Arthropoda
- Clade: Pancrustacea
- Class: Insecta
- Order: Mantodea
- Family: Amelidae
- Genus: Apteromantis
- Species: A. aptera

Binomial name
- Apteromantis aptera (Fuente, 1894)
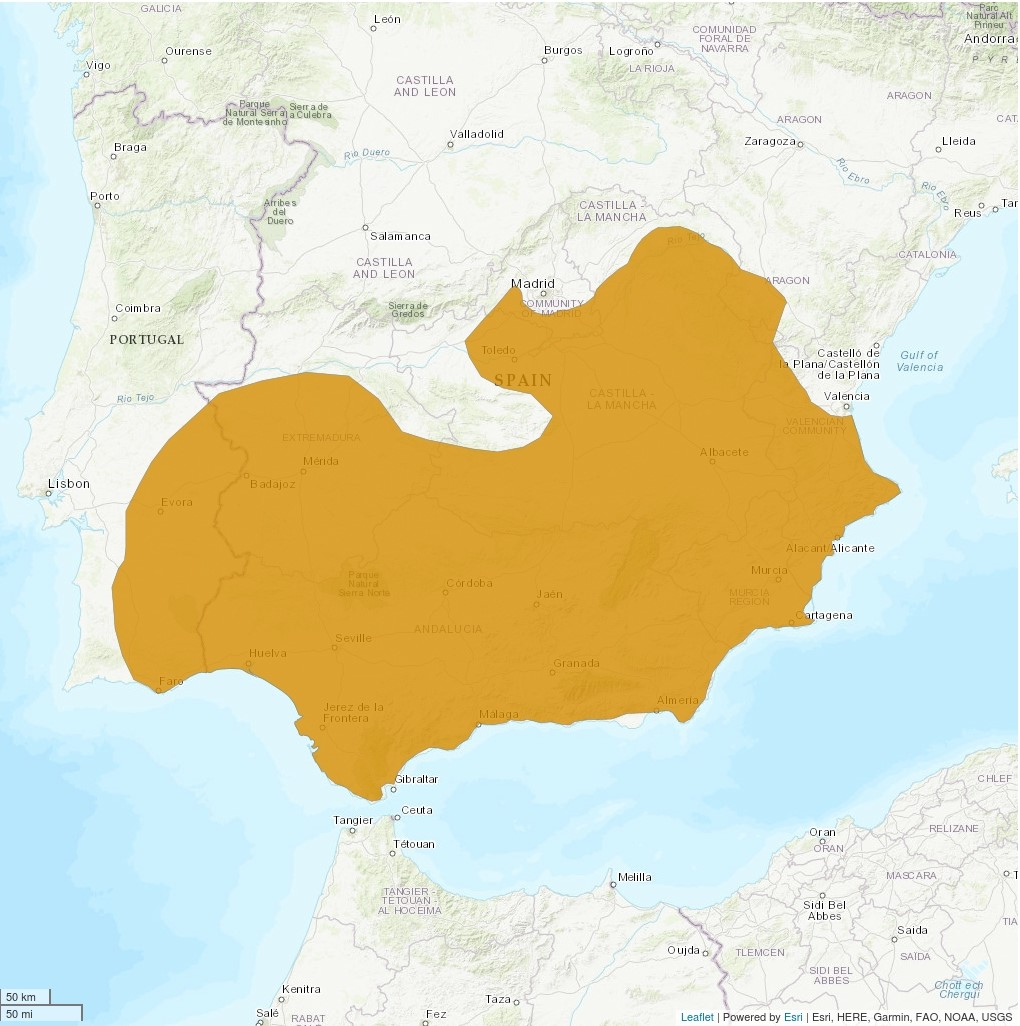
- Geographic distribution of Apteromantis aptera

Synonyms
- Ameles aptera Fuente, 1894

= Apteromantis aptera =

Species of praying mantis

Apteromantis aptera is a species of praying mantis endemic to the Iberian Peninsula. It was first described by José María Hugo de la Fuente Morales in 1894. It was previously considered to be endangered by the IUCN, but has been downgraded to least concern, as the populations are rising and they are spreading to new habitats in south-central Spain and southern Portugal.

This species may be brown, grey or green in colour. They can be distinguished from other mantids by the very angular eyes that taper to (upward and outwards facing) points. The nymphs hide low down in grasses and jump with agility, making them difficult to tell apart from small grasshoppers.

== See also ==
- List of mantis genera and species
