= Ameles moralesi =

Scientific classification
- Kingdom: Animalia
- Phylum: Arthropoda
- Clade: Pancrustacea
- Class: Insecta
- Order: Mantodea
- Family: Amelidae
- Genus: Ameles
- Species: A. moralesi

Binomial name
- Ameles moralesi Bolivar, 1936

Species of praying mantis

Ameles moralesi is a species of praying mantis found in Morocco.
