= Ameles kervillei =

Scientific classification
- Kingdom: Animalia
- Phylum: Arthropoda
- Clade: Pancrustacea
- Class: Insecta
- Order: Mantodea
- Family: Amelidae
- Genus: Ameles
- Species: A. kervillei

Binomial name
- Ameles kervillei Bolivar, 1911

Species of praying mantis

Ameles kervillei is a species of praying mantis that lives in Syria.
