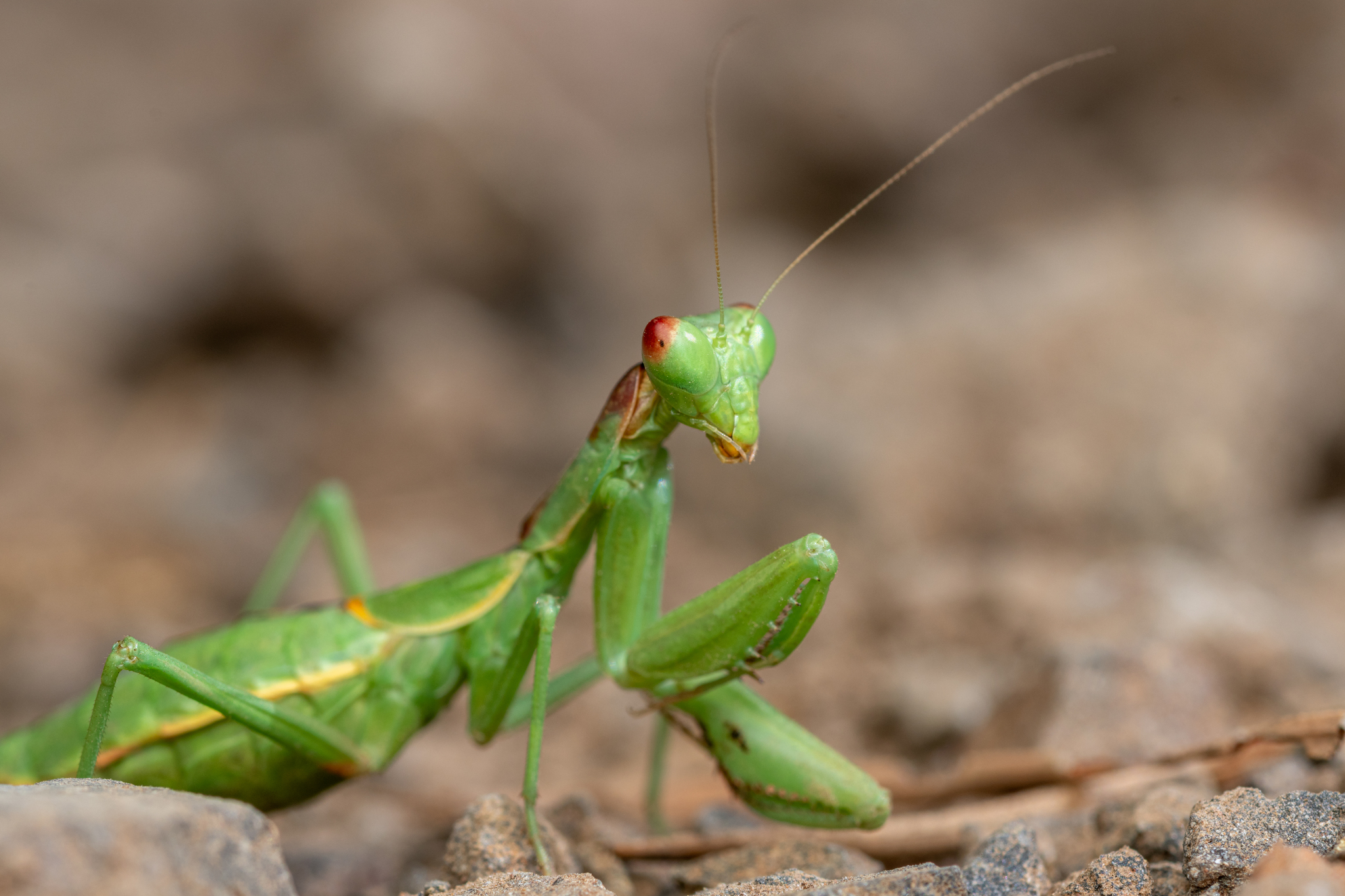

Conservation status
- Vulnerable (IUCN 3.1)

Scientific classification
- Kingdom: Animalia
- Phylum: Arthropoda
- Clade: Pancrustacea
- Class: Insecta
- Order: Mantodea
- Family: Amelidae
- Genus: Ameles
- Species: A. gracilis

Binomial name
- Ameles gracilis Brullé, 1840

Synonyms
- Mantis limbata (Brulle, 1838)

= Ameles gracilis =

Species of praying mantis

Ameles gracilis is a species of praying mantis endemic to the Canary Islands.
