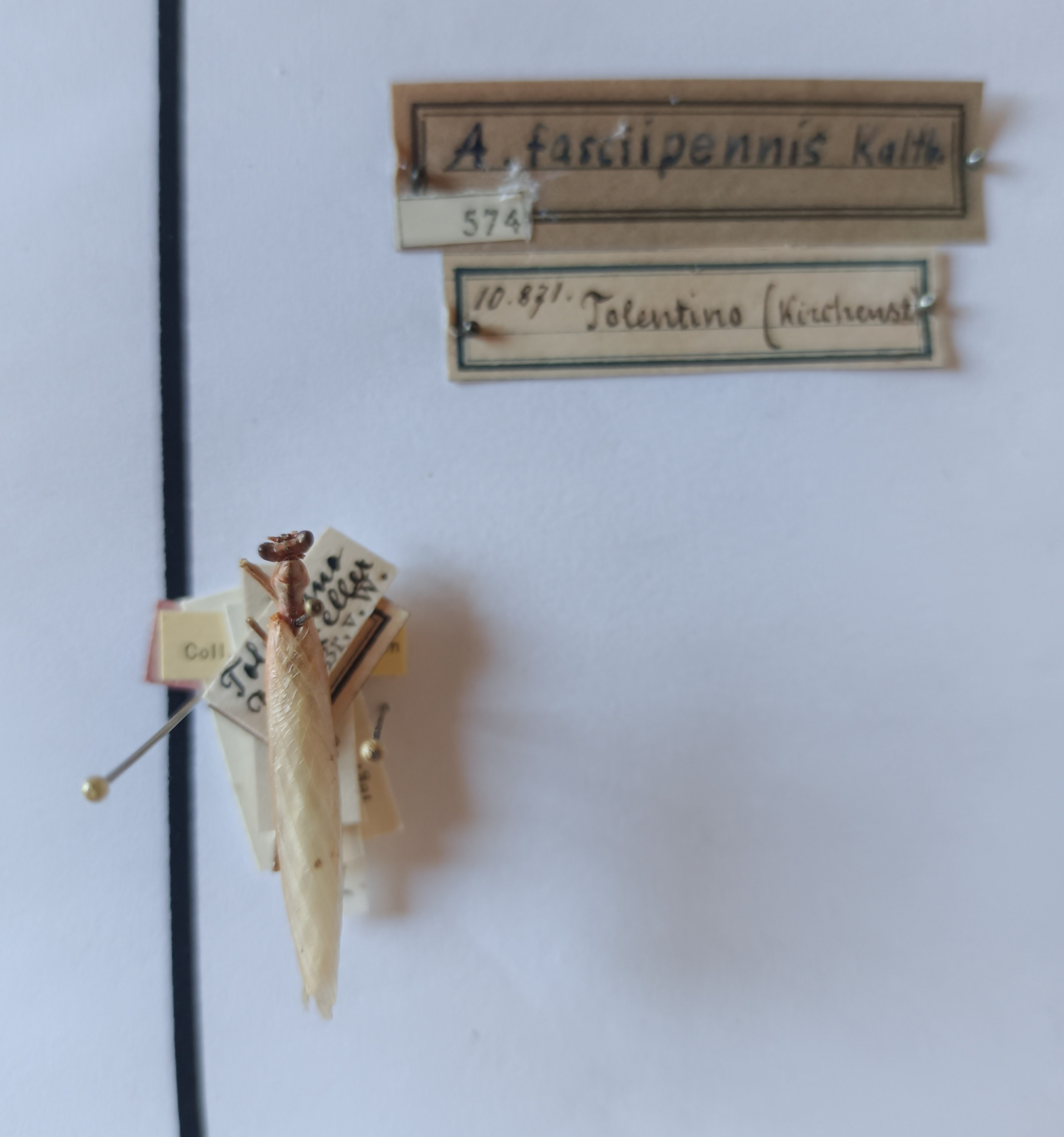
- Specimen in the Vienna Museum of Natural History

Conservation status
- Extinct (yes) (IUCN 3.1)

Scientific classification
- Kingdom: Animalia
- Phylum: Arthropoda
- Clade: Pancrustacea
- Class: Insecta
- Order: Mantodea
- Family: Amelidae
- Genus: Ameles
- Species: †A. fasciipennis

Binomial name
- †Ameles fasciipennis Kaltenbach, 1963

= Spined dwarf mantis =

Extinct species of praying mantis

The spined dwarf mantis (Ameles fasciipennis) is an extinct species of praying mantis that was endemic to Italy.

It has only been collected once, probably in 1871 in the Tolentino area, and has not been seen since, despite extensive entomological surveys of the region.

== Conservation ==
The IUCN Red List has declared this species extinct.
