= Apteromantis bolivari =

Scientific classification
- Kingdom: Animalia
- Phylum: Arthropoda
- Clade: Pancrustacea
- Class: Insecta
- Order: Mantodea
- Family: Amelidae
- Genus: Apteromantis
- Species: A. bolivari

Binomial name
- Apteromantis bolivari Werner, 1929

Species of praying mantis

Apteromantis bolivari is a species of praying mantis found in Algeria, Morocco, and Portugal.

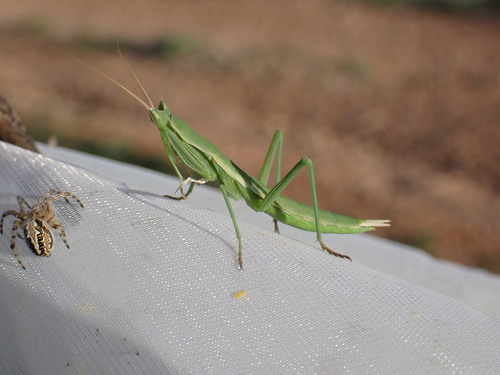
Apteromantis bolivari in Ifrane Province, Morocco

== See also ==
- List of mantis genera and species
