= Ameles poggii =

Scientific classification
- Kingdom: Animalia
- Phylum: Arthropoda
- Clade: Pancrustacea
- Class: Insecta
- Order: Mantodea
- Family: Amelidae
- Genus: Ameles
- Species: A. poggii

Binomial name
- Ameles poggii Lombardo, 1986

Species of praying mantis

Ameles poggii is a species of praying mantis found in Libya.
