= Stibaroptera =

Scientific classification
- Domain: Eukaryota
- Kingdom: Animalia
- Phylum: Arthropoda
- Class: Insecta
- Order: Orthoptera
- Suborder: Ensifera
- Family: Tettigoniidae
- Subfamily: Phaneropterinae
- Tribe: Holochlorini
- Genus: Stibaroptera; Bolívar, 1906

Synonyms
- Stibara Brunner von Wattenwyl, 1878

Genus of bush-crickets

External image
- Images at iNaturalist

Stibaroptera is an Asian genus of sickle-bearing bush-crickets, in the tribe Holochlorini, erected by Ignacio Bolívar in 1906. The recorded species distribution (possibly incomplete) includes Vietnam and western Malesia.

== Species ==
The Orthoptera Species File lists:

1. Stibaroptera longipes (Dohrn, 1892)
2. Stibaroptera major Karny, 1923
3. Stibaroptera nitidifolia (Haan, 1843) - type species (inherited from replaced name Stibara cornea Brunner von Wattenwyl)
4. Stibaroptera parvula Karny, 1926
- Note: S. martha (Krausze, 1903) is a nomen dubium
