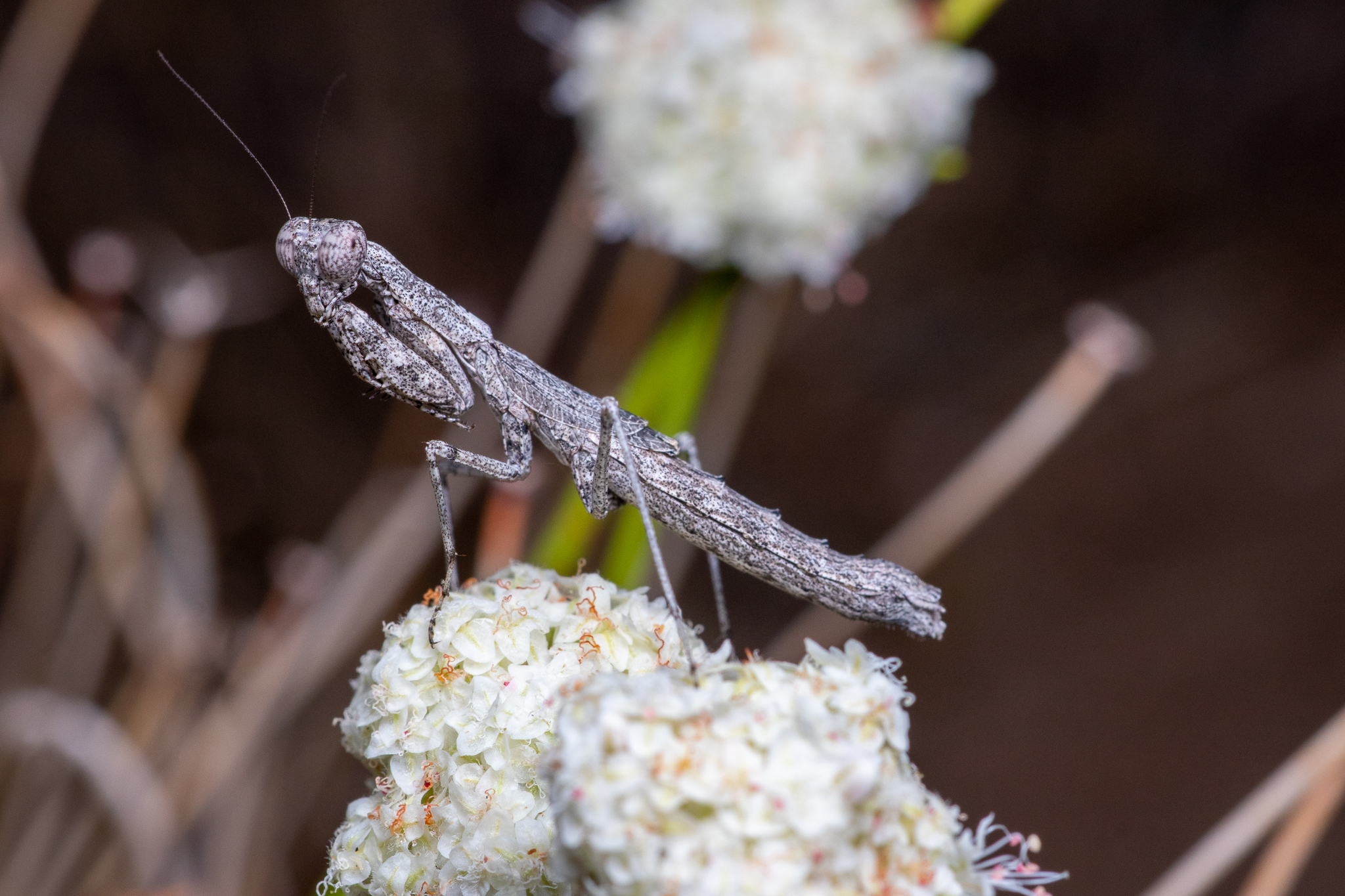

Scientific classification
- Kingdom: Animalia
- Phylum: Arthropoda
- Clade: Pancrustacea
- Class: Insecta
- Order: Mantodea
- Family: Amelidae
- Genus: Litaneutria
- Species: L. ocularis

Binomial name
- Litaneutria ocularis Saussure, 1892

= Litaneutria ocularis =

Species of praying mantis

Litaneutria ocularis is a species of praying mantis found in Mexico and the south-western United States (Texas).
