= Yersiniops newboldi =

Scientific classification
- Kingdom: Animalia
- Phylum: Arthropoda
- Clade: Pancrustacea
- Class: Insecta
- Order: Mantodea
- Family: Amelidae
- Genus: Yersiniops
- Species: Y. newboldi

Binomial name
- Yersiniops newboldi Hebard, 1931

Species of praying mantis

Yersiniops newboldii is a species of praying mantis found in Baja California, Mexico. The original scientific description for this species was published in Transactions of the American Entomological Society in 1931.

== See also ==
- List of mantis genera and species
