= Pseudoyersinia brevipennis =

Conservation status
- Extinct (1860) (IUCN 3.1)

Scientific classification
- Kingdom: Animalia
- Phylum: Arthropoda
- Clade: Pancrustacea
- Class: Insecta
- Order: Mantodea
- Family: Amelidae
- Genus: Pseudoyersinia
- Species: †P. brevipennis

Binomial name
- †Pseudoyersinia brevipennis (Yersin, 1860)

Synonyms
- Ameles brevipennis Saussure, 1871; Mantis brevipennis Yersin, 1860

Extinct species of praying mantis

Pseudoyersinia brevipennis is an extinct European species of praying mantids in the family Mantidae recorded from the Second French Empire.

The true range of this species has never been studied, as only three specimens were collected westwards of Toulon in 1860, and the species was never seen after this point. A final specimen was identified in 1990, 130 years after it was collected, adding up to four specimens.

Having not been seen in well over a century and a half, the species was eventually declared extinct in 2020. Its true distribution, behaviour, threats, and date of extinction all remain unknown as a result.
