= Ameles picteti =

Scientific classification
- Kingdom: Animalia
- Phylum: Arthropoda
- Clade: Pancrustacea
- Class: Insecta
- Order: Mantodea
- Family: Amelidae
- Genus: Ameles
- Species: A. picteti

Binomial name
- Ameles picteti Saussure, 1869

Species of praying mantis

Ameles picteti is a species of praying mantis found in Algeria, Sicily, and Spain.
