= Litaneutria pacifica =

Scientific classification
- Kingdom: Animalia
- Phylum: Arthropoda
- Clade: Pancrustacea
- Class: Insecta
- Order: Mantodea
- Family: Amelidae
- Genus: Litaneutria
- Species: L. pacifica

Binomial name
- Litaneutria pacifica Scudder, 1896

Species of praying mantis

Litaneutria pacifica is a species of praying mantis found in North America.
