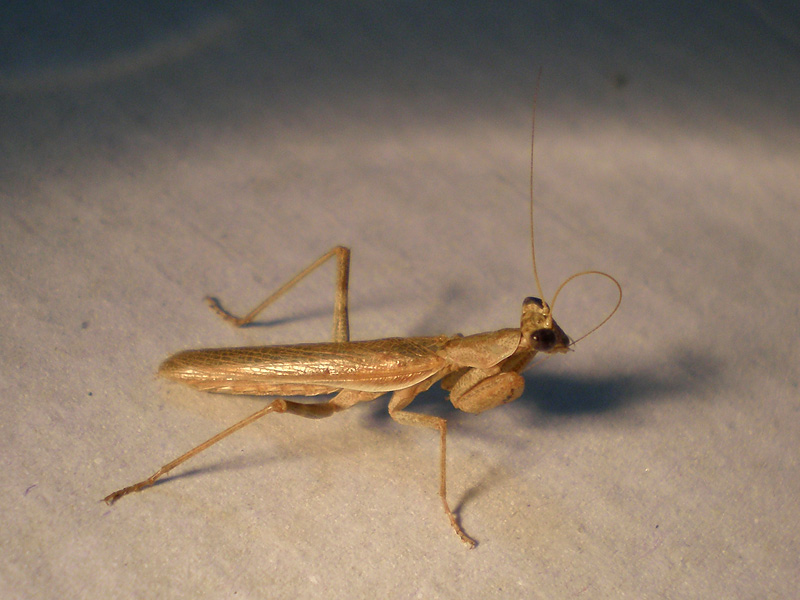
- Male
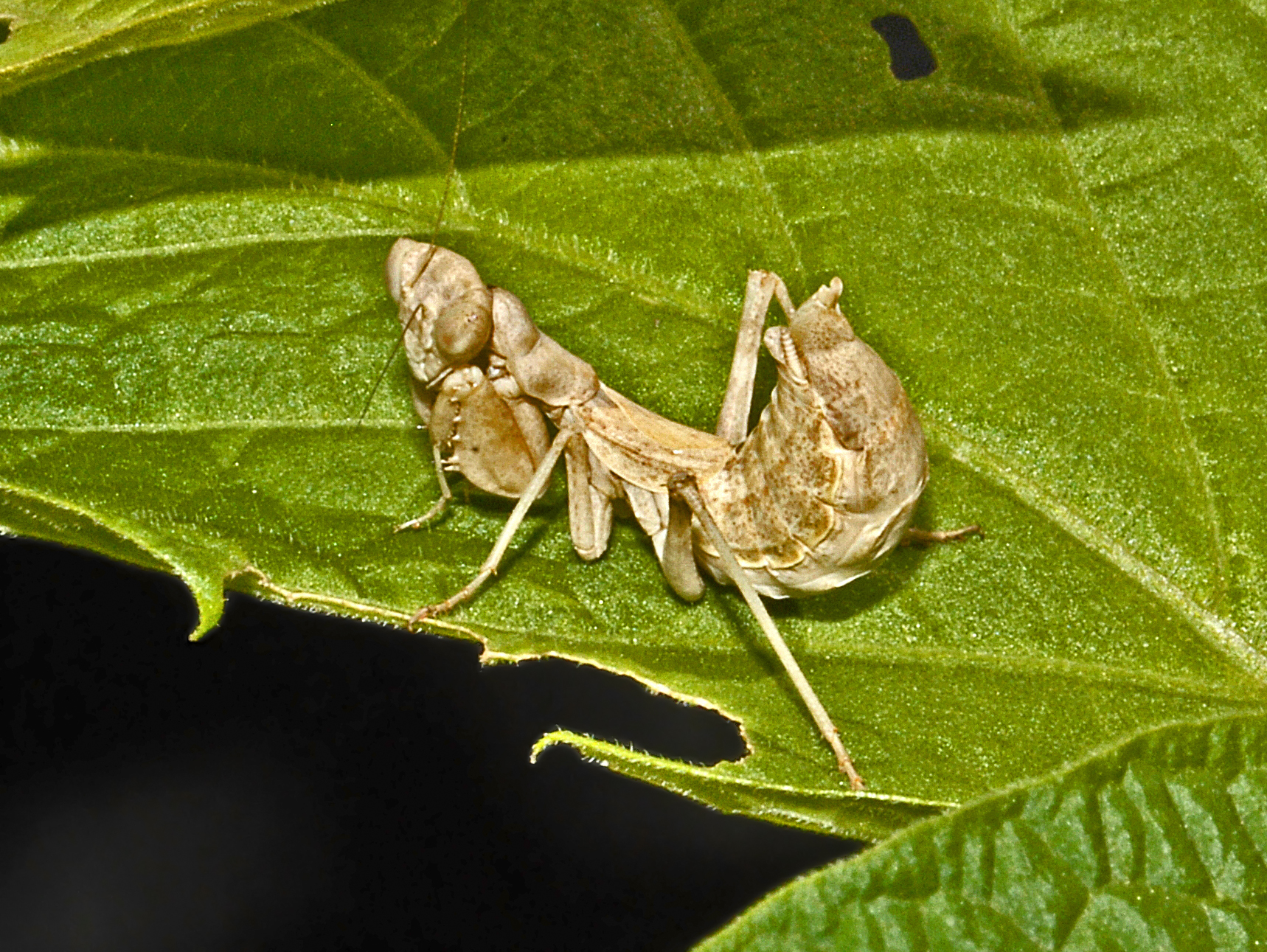
- Female

Conservation status
- Least Concern (IUCN 3.1)

Scientific classification
- Kingdom: Animalia
- Phylum: Arthropoda
- Clade: Pancrustacea
- Class: Insecta
- Order: Mantodea
- Family: Amelidae
- Genus: Ameles
- Species: A. spallanzania

Binomial name
- Ameles spallanzania (Rossi, 1792)

Synonyms
- Mantis spallanzania Rossi, 1792

= Ameles spallanzania =

European dwarf mantis

Species of praying mantis

Ameles spallanzania, common name European dwarf mantis, is a species of praying mantis.

== Etymology ==
The species name spallanzania honors the Italian naturalist Lazzaro Spallanzani.

== Description ==
Ameles spallanzania can reach a length of 18–40 millimetres (0.71–1.57 in). Their colour may be brown, green, ochre or grey. The eyes are slightly pointed, antennae are threadlike, the pronotum is short and squared and the broad abdomen of the females is commonly curled upwards. This very small mantid (hence the common name) is characterized by an evident sexual dimorphism. The males are winged and have a quite slender body, while females show stubby bodies and are unable to fly, as they possess only small wing vestiges (brachypterous).

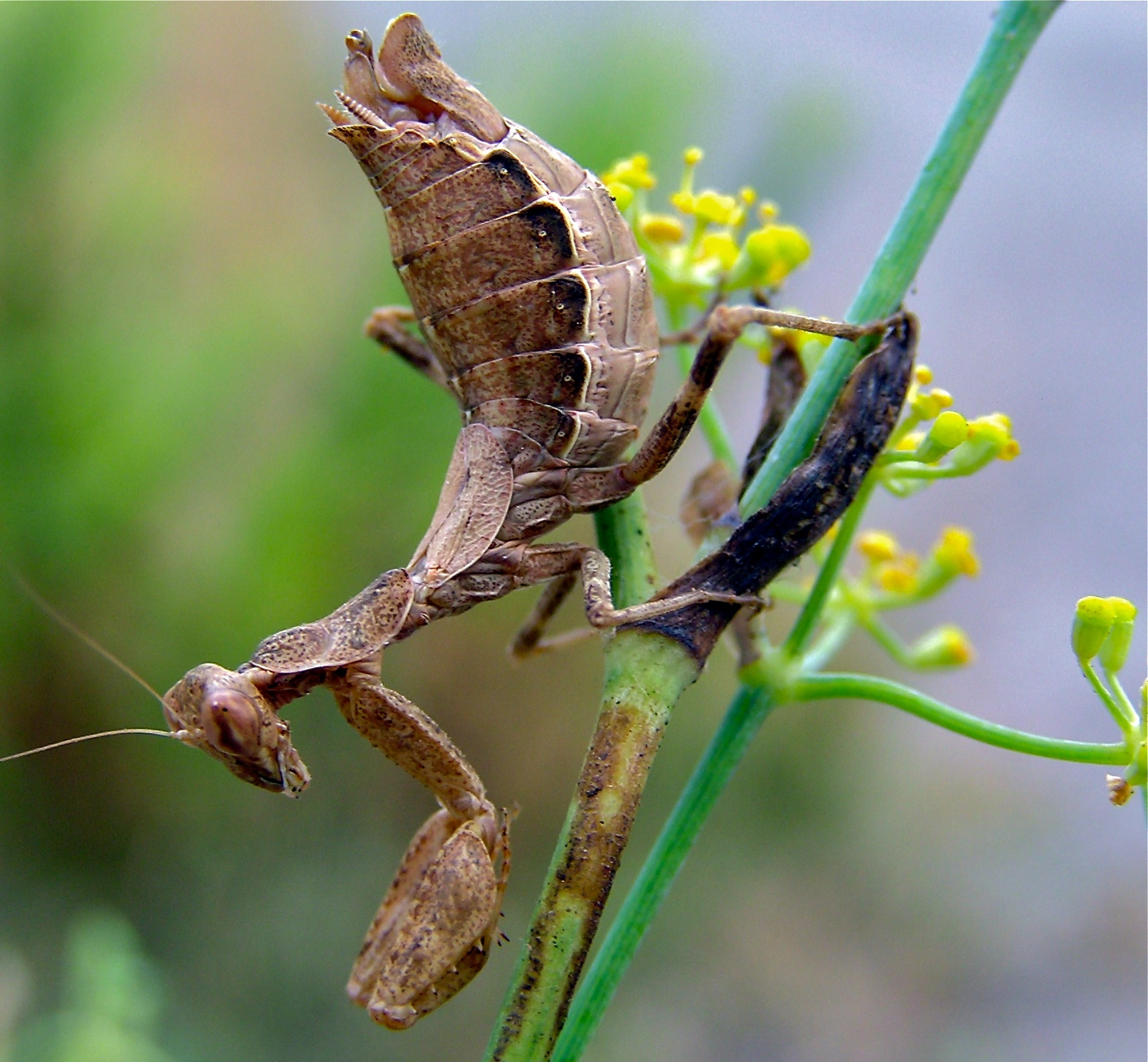
European dwarf mantis

== Biology ==
This thermophile species shows adaptable life-cycle strategies in different latitudes, as hatching earlier, more than one generation per year or overwintering nymphs or oothecae. Adults can be found from late spring to late summer, depending on the latitude. Nymphs usually hatch in July and the ootheca is commonly laid in September.

Similarly to the common Mantis religiosa the females may cannibalise the males whilst mating.

== Distribution ==
This species can be found in the Mediterranean area, from Morocco to Greece and from southern Europe to northern Africa (Albania, Algeria, Dalmatia, France, Greece, Italy, Malta, Libya, Morocco, Portugal, Spain, Tunisia).

== Habitat ==
These mantids prefer sparse low vegetation in warm, dry places.

== Bibliography ==
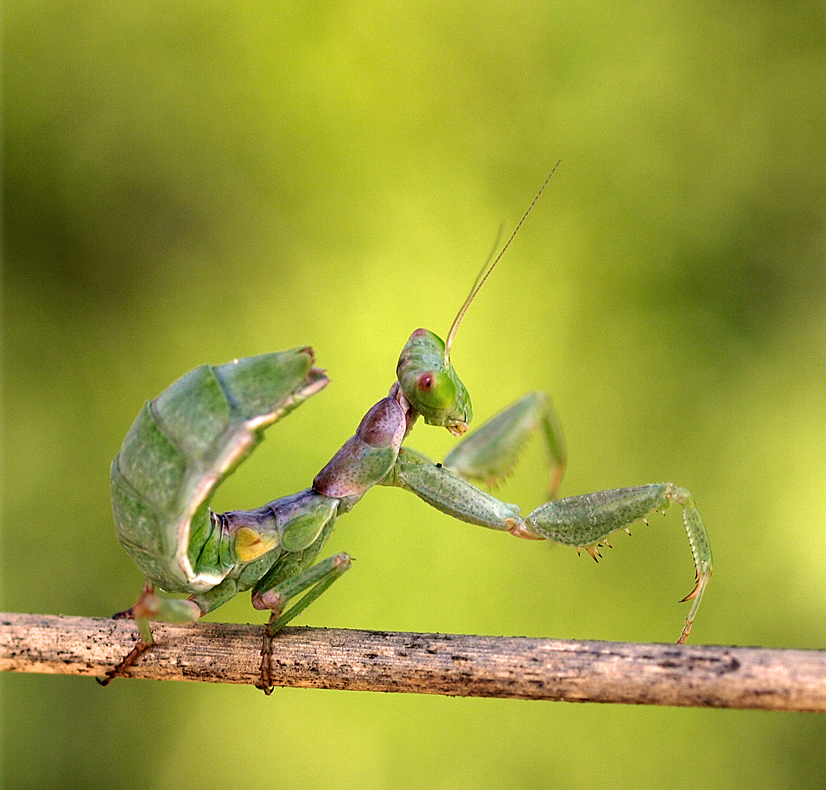
Female of A. spallanzania

- Yager, David D.; Svenson, Gavin J. (28 June 2008). "Patterns of praying mantis auditory system evolution based on morphological, molecular, neurophysiological, and behavioural data: MANTIS EAR PHYLOGENY". Biological Journal of the Linnean Society. 94 (3): 541–568. Bibcode:2008BJLS...94..541Y. doi:10.1111/j.1095-8312.2008.00996.x.
- Svenson, Gavin J.; Whiting, Michael F. (October 2009). "Reconstructing the origins of praying mantises (Dictyoptera, Mantodea): the roles of Gondwanan vicariance and morphological convergence". Cladistics. 25 (5): 468–514. Bibcode:2009Cladi..25..468S. doi:10.1111/j.1096-0031.2009.00263.x. PMID 34879623. S2CID 86659271.
- Battiston, Roberto; Fontana, Paolo (2005). "A contribution to the knowledge of the genus Ameles Burmeister, 1838, with the description of a new species from Jordan (Insecta Mantodea)" (PDF). Atti della Accademia Roveretana degli Agiati, Serie 8 B, Classe di Scienze, Matematiche, Fisiche e Naturali. 5: 173–197.
- Cogo A.; Battiston R. (2007). "Nuovi dati sulla distribuzione di ameles spallanzania (Rossi, 1792) in Italia (Insecta Mantodea, Amelinae)". Natura Vicentina (in Italian). 11: 23–29.
- Battiston, Roberto (2010). Mantids of the Euro-Mediterranean Area. World Biodiversity Association. ISBN 978-88-903323-1-9.
- Agabiti, Barbara; Ippolito, Salvatrice; Lombardo, Francesco (2010). "The Mediterranean species of the genus Ameles Burmeister, 1838 (Insecta, Mantodea: Amelinae): with a biogeographic and phylogenetic evaluation". Boletín de la SEA (47): 1–20.
- Tomasinelli, Francesco; Salemi, Marco (2020). La mantis religiosa y los insectos palo (in Spanish). Parkstone International. ISBN 978-1-64699-806-7.

== See also ==
- List of mantis genera and species
