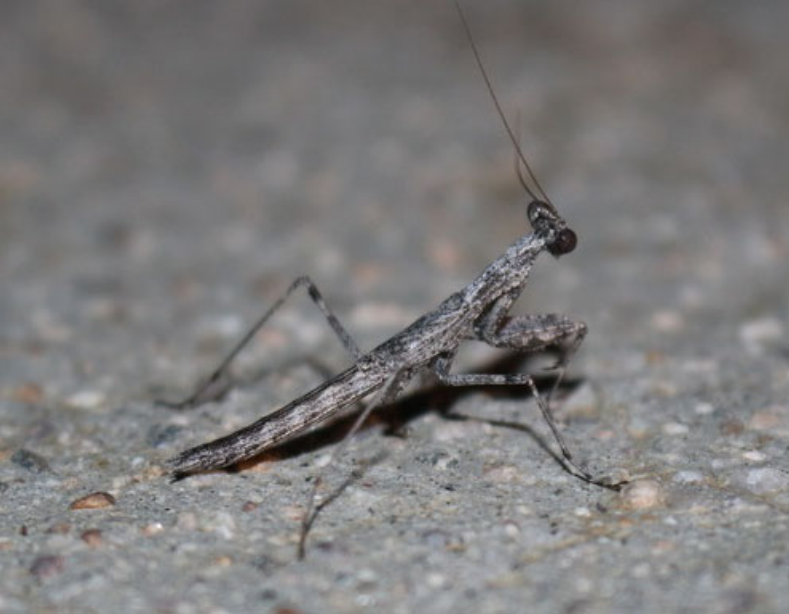

Scientific classification
- Kingdom: Animalia
- Phylum: Arthropoda
- Clade: Pancrustacea
- Class: Insecta
- Order: Mantodea
- Family: Amelidae
- Genus: Litaneutria
- Species: L. obscura

Binomial name
- Litaneutria obscura Scudder, 1872

Synonyms
- Tithrone corseuli Jantsch, 1986

= Litaneutria obscura =

Species of insect

Litaneutria obscura, commonly known as the obscure ground mantis, is a species of praying mantis in North America.

It is native to Arizona, southern California, Texas, and New Mexico.
