= Ameles maroccana =

Scientific classification
- Kingdom: Animalia
- Phylum: Arthropoda
- Clade: Pancrustacea
- Class: Insecta
- Order: Mantodea
- Family: Amelidae
- Genus: Ameles
- Species: A. maroccana

Binomial name
- Ameles maroccana Uvarov, 1931

Species of praying mantis

Ameles maroccana, the Morocco ameles, is a species of praying mantis found in Morocco.
