= Litaneutria baccina =

Scientific classification
- Kingdom: Animalia
- Phylum: Arthropoda
- Class: Insecta
- Order: Mantodea
- Family: Amelidae
- Genus: Litaneutria
- Species: L. baccina

Binomial name
- Litaneutria baccina Anderson, 2021

Species of insect

Litaneutria baccina is a small mantis in the genus Litaneutria, native to the Great Basin Desert in the western United States.
