= Ameles wadisirhani =

Scientific classification
- Kingdom: Animalia
- Phylum: Arthropoda
- Clade: Pancrustacea
- Class: Insecta
- Order: Mantodea
- Family: Amelidae
- Genus: Ameles
- Species: A. wadisirhani

Binomial name
- Ameles wadisirhani Kaltenbach, 1982

Species of praying mantis

Ameles wadisirhani is a species of praying mantis found in Saudi Arabia.
