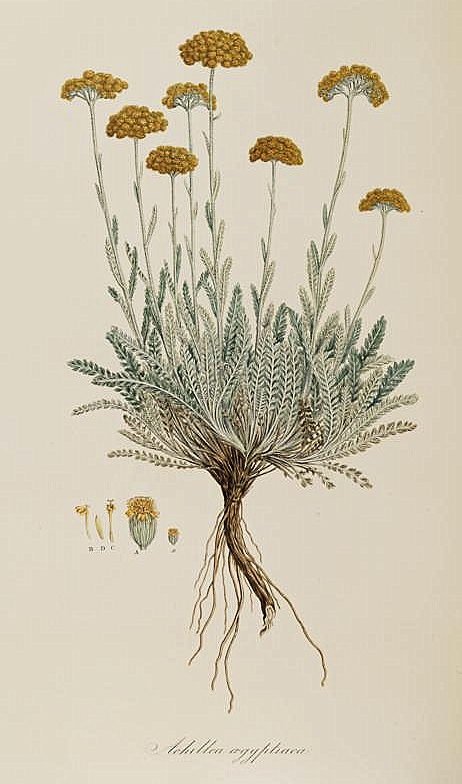
- Botanical illustration of Achillea aegyptiaca in Flora Graeca (1837)

Conservation status
- Near Threatened (IUCN 3.1)

Scientific classification
- Kingdom: Plantae
- Clade: Tracheophytes
- Clade: Angiosperms
- Clade: Eudicots
- Clade: Asterids
- Order: Asterales
- Family: Asteraceae
- Genus: Achillea
- Species: A. aegyptiaca

Binomial name
- Achillea aegyptiaca L., 1753

Synonyms
- Achillea pallida Salisb.; Achillea tournefortii DC.

= Achillea aegyptiaca =

Species of yarrow

Achillea aegyptiaca, the Egyptian yarrow, is an ornamental plant in the aster family native to Greece.

== Description ==
Achillea aegyptiaca is an evergreen herbaceous species with stems growing nearly 0.6 metres (2 ft) high. The foliage is soft, with a nappy covering lending a grey or silvery appearance. The leaves are 15 to 20 centimetres (6 to 8 in) long, narrow and pinnate, the leaflets variously toothed and lobed. Tufts of smaller grey leaves appear at the nodes, with practically no leaves at the top of the stems.

From June to September, at the top of the stems appear flattened heads or corymbs, 5 to 7.5 cm (2 to 3 in) in width, of closely packed small flowers. They resemble those of common yarrow, but are bright light yellow.

== Distribution and habitat ==
The species is native to Greece, although it was formerly believed to come from the warmer climate of Egypt, as stated by John Wood.

== Cultivation ==
Wood states of the plant in his Hardy Perennials and Old Fashioned Flowers:

It has been grown for more than 200 years in English gardens [and] proves to be one of the hardiest plants in our gardens. ... [It] not only produces a rich yellow flower, but the whole plant is ornamental, having an abundance of finely cut foliage ... and its propagation may be carried out at any time by root division.
