= A. arabica =

A. arabica may refer to:

An abbreviation of a species name. In binomial nomenclature the name of a species is always the name of the genus to which the species belongs, followed by the species name (also called the species epithet). In A. arabica the genus name has been abbreviated to A. and the species has been spelled out in full. In a document that uses this abbreviation it should always be clear from the context which genus name has been abbreviated.

Some of the most common uses of A. arabica are:

- Alcithoe arabica, a very large sea snail species
- Ameles arabica, a praying mantis species that inhabits Saudi Arabia
- Apisa arabica, a moth species found in Saudi Arabia

== Synonyms ==
- Acacia arabica, a synonym for Acacia nilotica, the gum arabic tree, babul, Egyptian thorn or prickly acacia, a plant species native to Africa and the Indian subcontinent

== See also ==
- Arabica (disambiguation)
