= Litaneutria chaparrali =

Scientific classification
- Kingdom: Animalia
- Phylum: Arthropoda
- Class: Insecta
- Order: Mantodea
- Family: Amelidae
- Genus: Litaneutria
- Species: L. chaparrali

Binomial name
- Litaneutria chaparrali Anderson, 2021

Species of insect

Litaneutria chaparrali is a small ground mantis in the family Amelidae, native to Southern California and Baja California.
