= Tapiena =

Scientific classification
- Domain: Eukaryota
- Kingdom: Animalia
- Phylum: Arthropoda
- Class: Insecta
- Order: Orthoptera
- Suborder: Ensifera
- Family: Tettigoniidae
- Subfamily: Phaneropterinae
- Tribe: Holochlorini
- Genus: Tapiena; Bolívar, 1906

Synonyms
- Tapeina Brunner von Wattenwyl, 1878 (junior homonym)

Genus of bush-crickets

External image
- Images at iNaturalist

Tapiena is an Asian genus of sickle-bearing bush-crickets, in the tribe Holochlorini, erected by Ignacio Bolívar in 1906. The known species distribution (possibly incomplete) includes India, China, Indochina (not recorded from Vietnam), western Malesia and an African record from Ghana.

== Species ==
Tan et al. give a key to the species; the Orthoptera Species File lists:

1. Tapiena acutangula (Brunner von Wattenwyl, 1878) - type species (inherited from replaced name Tapeina)
2. Tapiena bilobata Liu & Kang, 2010
3. Tapiena bivittata Xia & Liu, 1993
4. Tapiena bullata Karny, 1923
5. Tapiena cerciata Hebard, 1922
6. Tapiena chelicerca Karny, 1931
7. Tapiena cucullata (Brunner von Wattenwyl, 1891)
8. Tapiena denticulata Tan, Liu & Artchawakom, 2015
9. Tapiena emarginata Karny, 1923
10. Tapiena ensigera Karny, 1923
11. Tapiena hainanensis Liu & Xia, 1996
12. Tapiena incisa Karny, 1923
13. Tapiena javanica Karny, 1926
14. Tapiena latifolia Ingrisch & Shishodia, 2000
15. Tapiena longzhouensis Liu, 2004
16. Tapiena minor Bolívar, 1906
17. Tapiena paraincisa Tan & Wahab, 2018
18. Tapiena parapentagona Liu & Kang, 2010
19. Tapiena pardalis (Walker, 1869)
20. Tapiena pentagona Karny, 1923
21. Tapiena quadridens Liu & Xia, 1996
22. Tapiena sakaerat Tan, Liu & Artchawakom, 2015
23. Tapiena simplicis Liu & Xia, 1996
24. Tapiena spinicaudata Liu & Xia, 1996
25. Tapiena stridulous Liu & Kang, 2010
26. Tapiena stylata Bey-Bienko, 1935
27. Tapiena triangulata Karny, 1926
28. Tapiena truncata (Brunner von Wattenwyl, 1891)
29. Tapiena yunnana Xia & Liu, 1990
