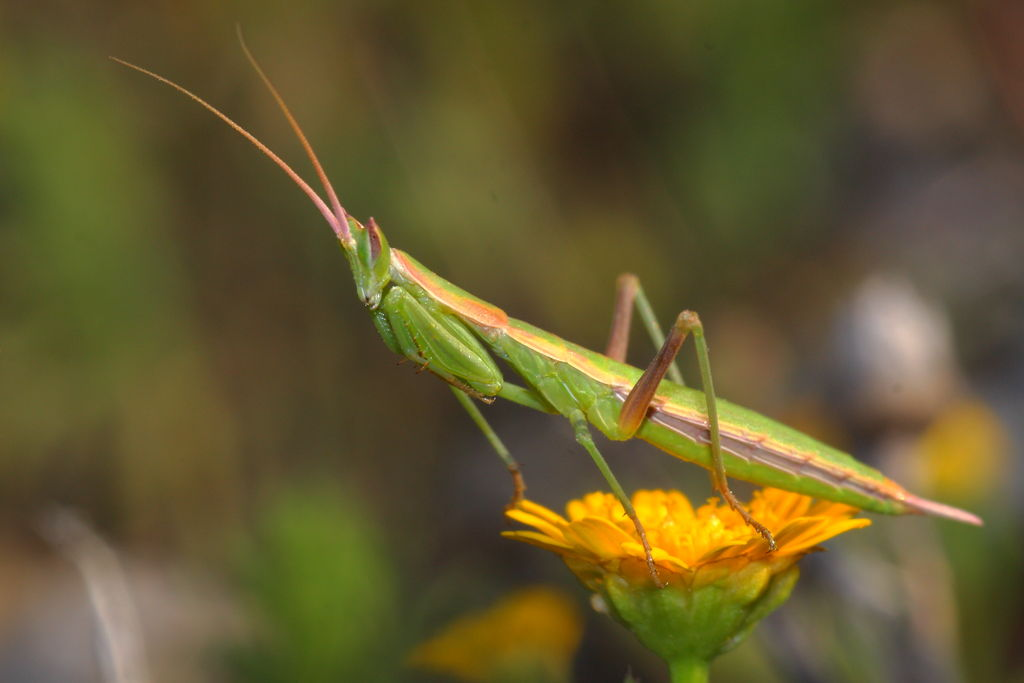
- Apteromantis aptera

Scientific classification
- Kingdom: Animalia
- Phylum: Arthropoda
- Class: Insecta
- Order: Mantodea
- Family: Amelidae
- Tribe: Amelini
- Genus: Apteromantis

= Apteromantis =

Genus of praying mantises

Apteromantis (from Ancient Greek ἀ- (a-), meaning "-less", πτερόν (pterón), meaning "wing", and "mantis") is a genus of mantises found in Europe and North Africa.

== Species ==
The Mantodea Species File lists two species:

- Apteromantis aptera
- Apteromantis bolivari - type species
