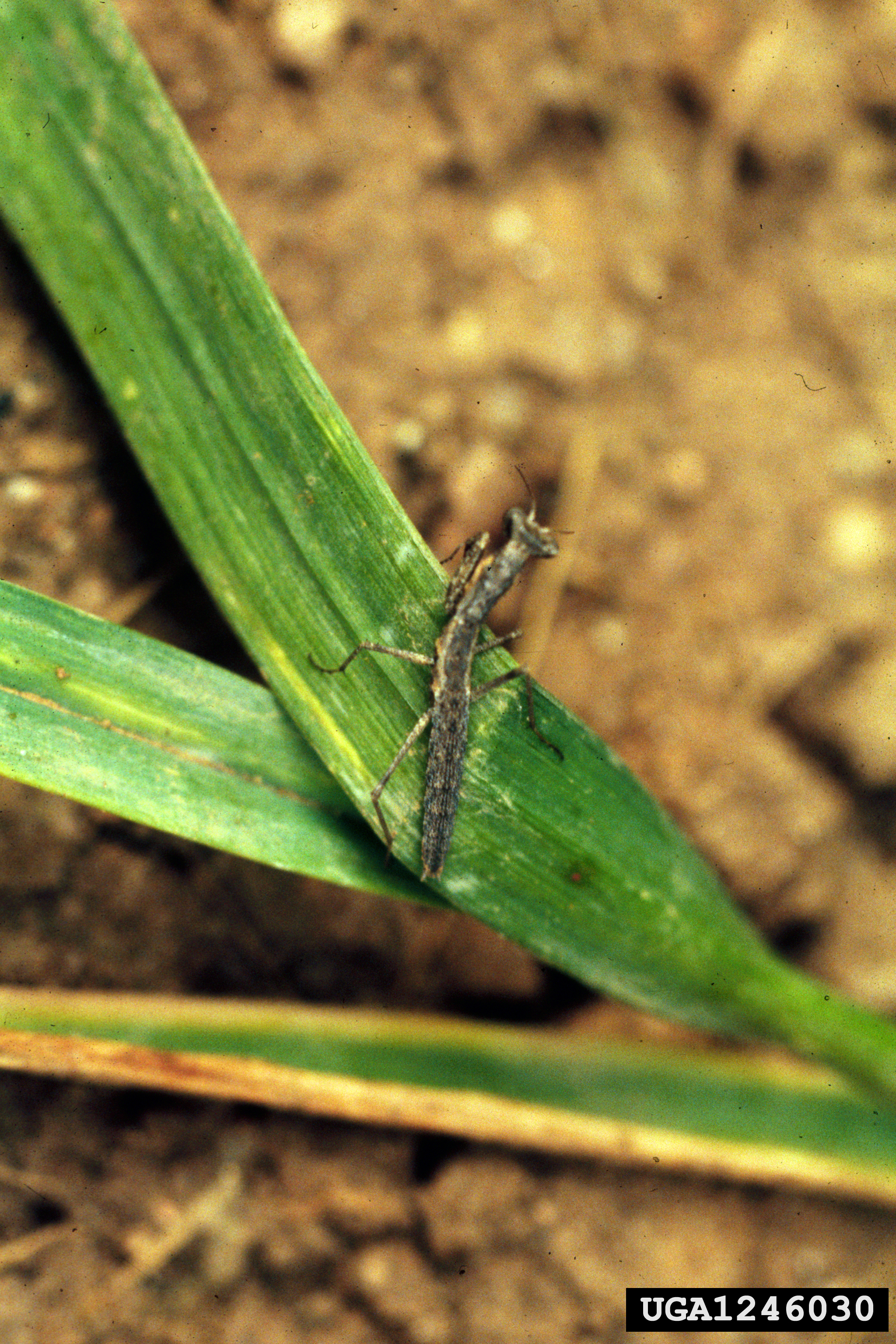

Scientific classification
- Domain: Eukaryota
- Kingdom: Animalia
- Phylum: Arthropoda
- Class: Insecta
- Order: Mantodea
- Family: Amelidae
- Tribe: Litaneutriini
- Genus: Litaneutria; Saussure, 1892

Type species
- Litaneutria ocularis Saussure, 1892

= Litaneutria =

Genus of praying mantises

Litaneutria is a genus of ground mantises in the family Amelidae found in North America.

== Species ==
- Litaneutria baccina Anderson, 2021
- Litaneutria chaparrali Anderson, 2021
- Litaneutria emarginata Anderson, 2018
- Litaneutria littoralis Anderson, 2021
- Litaneutria minor (Scudder, 1872)
- Litaneutria obscura Scudder, 1896
- Litaneutria ocularis Saussure, 1892
- Litaneutria pacifica Scudder, 1896
- Litaneutria scopulosa Anderson, 2021
- Litaneutria skinneri Rehn, 1907
- Litaneutria superna Anderson, 2021
- †Litaneutria pilosuspedes Terriquez et al. 2022

== See also ==
- List of mantis genera and species
