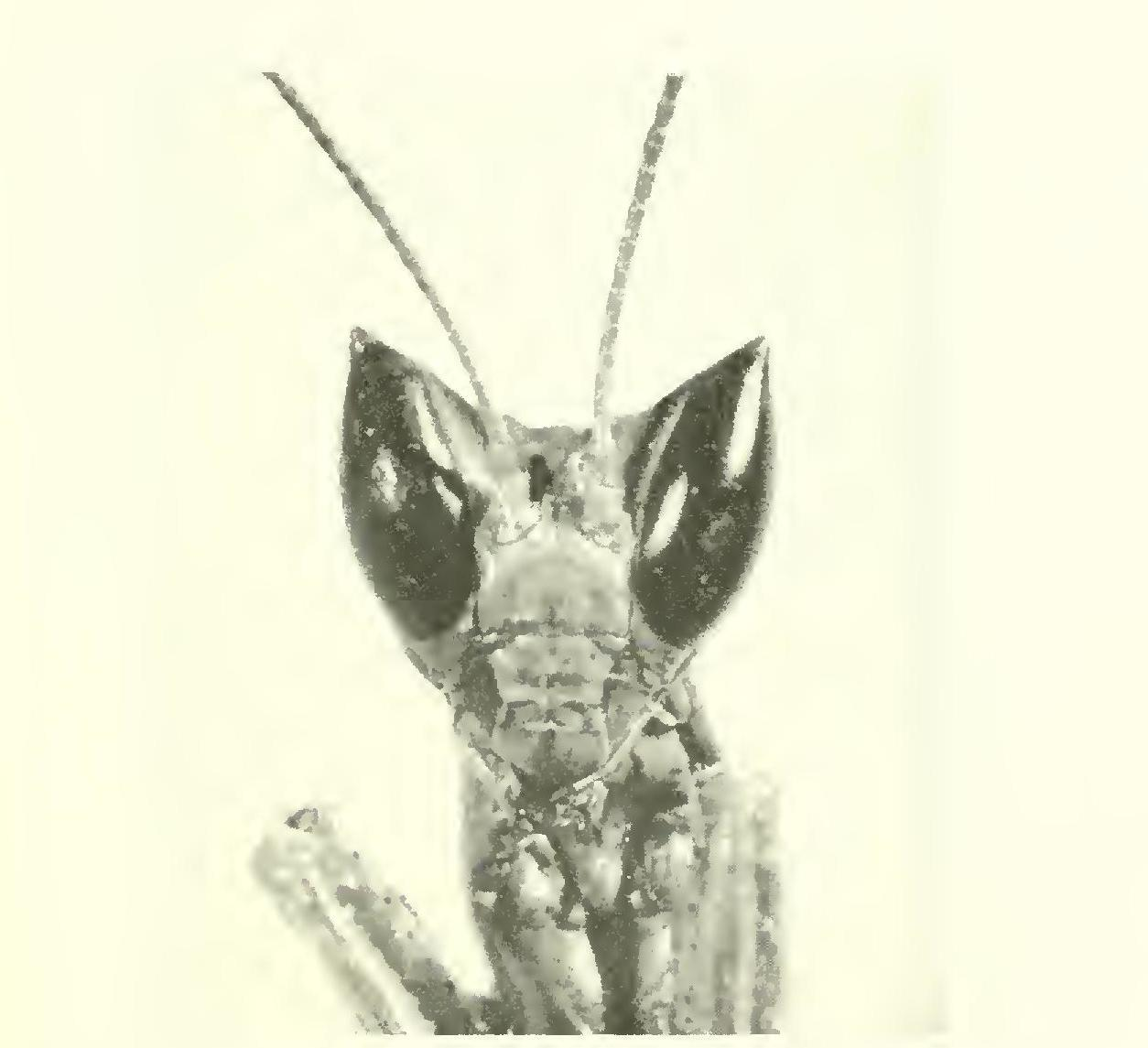

Scientific classification
- Kingdom: Animalia
- Phylum: Arthropoda
- Clade: Pancrustacea
- Class: Insecta
- Order: Mantodea
- Family: Amelidae
- Genus: Yersiniops
- Species: Y. solitarius

Binomial name
- Yersiniops solitarius (Scudder, 1896)

= Yersiniops solitarius =

Species of praying mantis

Yersinops solitarius is a species of praying mantis native to the United States, and is known to occur in Arizona, New Mexico, and Colorado. In southeastern Colorado, this uncommonly seen species occurs in prairie sites where grasses and shrubs are mixed. A small size mantid (body length: 18–22 millimetres (0.71–0.87 in)), often straw-colored with a slightly pointed projection in the area around the eyes. They are wingless or have very short, non-functional wings; this species is an excellent jumper.

== See also ==
- List of mantis genera and species
