= Ameles syriensis =

Scientific classification
- Kingdom: Animalia
- Phylum: Arthropoda
- Clade: Pancrustacea
- Class: Insecta
- Order: Mantodea
- Family: Amelidae
- Genus: Ameles
- Species: A. syriensis

Binomial name
- Ameles syriensis Giglio-Tos, 1915

Species of praying mantis

Ameles syriensis, the Syrian ameles, is a species of mantis found in Syria and Turkey.
