= Yersiniops =

Scientific classification
- Kingdom: Animalia
- Phylum: Arthropoda
- Class: Insecta
- Order: Mantodea
- Family: Amelidae
- Tribe: Litaneutriini
- Genus: Yersiniops; Hebard, 1931

Genus of praying mantises

Yersiniops is a genus of praying mantises native to the Americas.

== Species ==
The following species are also recognised in the genus Yersiniops:

- Yersiniops newboldi
- Yersiniops solitarius
- Yersiniops sophronicus

Two species, Y. solitarius and Y. sophronicus, can be found in the United States.

== See also ==
- List of mantis genera and species
