= Litaneutria skinneri =

Scientific classification
- Kingdom: Animalia
- Phylum: Arthropoda
- Clade: Pancrustacea
- Class: Insecta
- Order: Mantodea
- Family: Amelidae
- Genus: Litaneutria
- Species: L. skinneri

Binomial name
- Litaneutria skinneri Rehn, 1907

Species of praying mantis

Litaneutria skinneri, commonly known as the Skinner's ground mantis, is a species of praying mantis found in the south-western United States (Arizona, New Mexico, and Texas). It is also found in western and central Montana.
