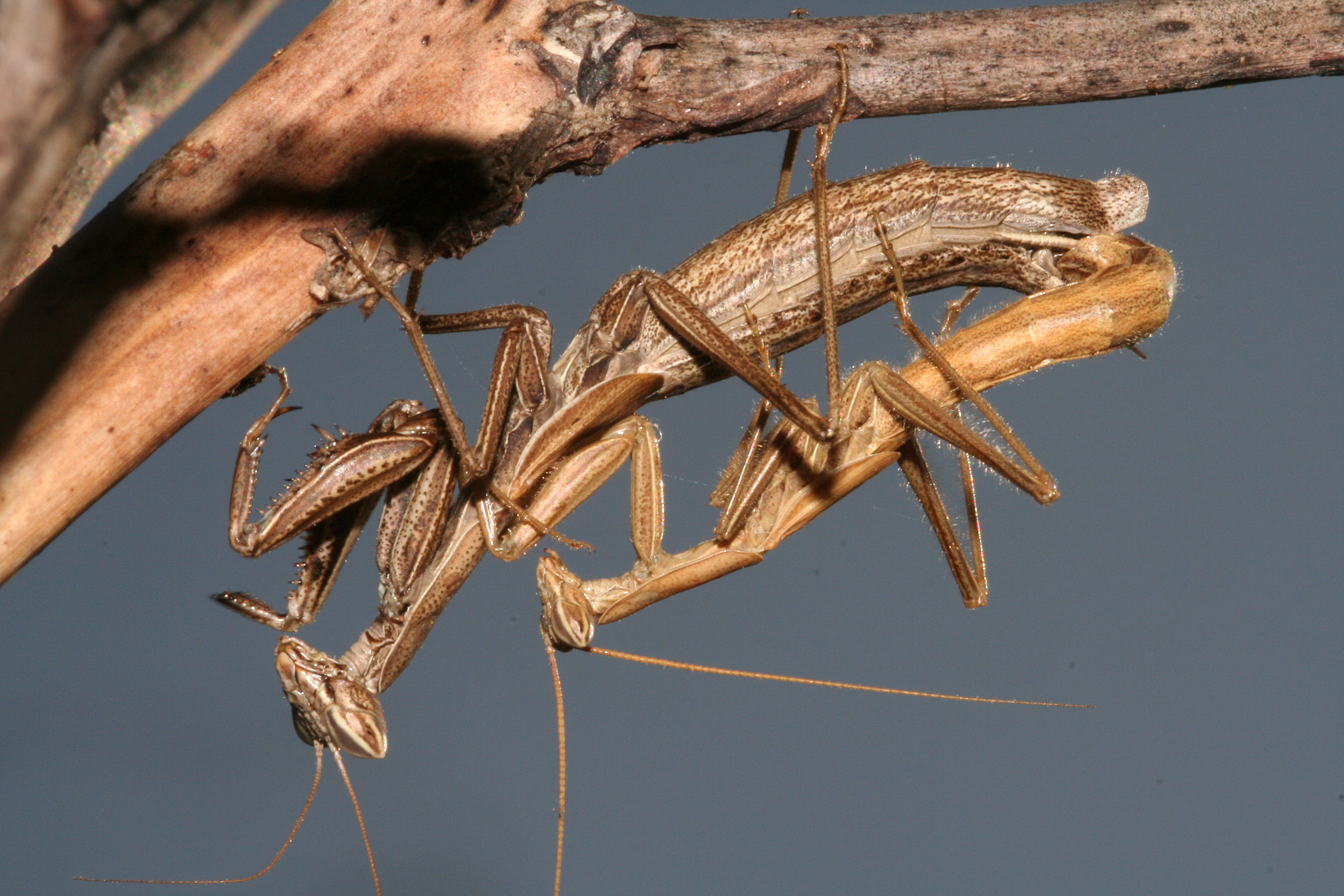
- Pseudoyersinia lagrecai

Scientific classification
- Kingdom: Animalia
- Phylum: Arthropoda
- Clade: Pancrustacea
- Class: Insecta
- Order: Mantodea
- Family: Amelidae
- Tribe: Amelini
- Genus: Pseudoyersinia; Kirby, 1904

Species
- see text

= Pseudoyersinia =

Genus of praying mantises

Pseudoyersinia is a genus of European praying mantids in the tribe Amelini. Species have been recorded from southern Europe and Atlantic islands.

== Species ==
The following are included:

- Pseudoyersinia andreae Galvagni, 1976
- Pseudoyersinia betancuriae Wiemers, 1993
- †Pseudoyersinia brevipennis Yersin, 1860 - type species
- Pseudoyersinia canariensis Chopard, 1942
- Pseudoyersinia inaspectata Lombardo, 1986
- Pseudoyersinia kabilica Lombardo, 1986
- Pseudoyersinia lagrecai Lombardo, 1984
- Pseudoyersinia maroccana Battiston, Correas, Lombardo, Mouna, Payne & Schütte, 2018
- Pseudoyersinia occidentalis Bolivar, 1914
- Pseudoyersinia paui Bolivar, 1898
- Pseudoyersinia pilipes Chopard, 1954
- Pseudoyersinia salvinae Lombardo, 1986
- Pseudoyersinia subaptera Chopard, 1942 (Synonym: P. lindbergi Chopard, 1954)
- Pseudoyersinia teydeana Chopard, 1942

== See also ==
- List of mantis genera and species
