= Ameles arabica =

Scientific classification
- Kingdom: Animalia
- Phylum: Arthropoda
- Clade: Pancrustacea
- Class: Insecta
- Order: Mantodea
- Family: Amelidae
- Genus: Ameles
- Species: A. arabica

Binomial name
- Ameles arabica Uvarov, 1939

Species of praying mantis

Ameles arabica, the Arabic ameles, is a species of mantis that inhabits Saudi Arabia.
