= Yersiniops sophronicus =

Scientific classification
- Kingdom: Animalia
- Phylum: Arthropoda
- Clade: Pancrustacea
- Class: Insecta
- Order: Mantodea
- Family: Amelidae
- Genus: Yersiniops
- Species: Y. sophronicus

Binomial name
- Yersiniops sophronicus (Rehn & Hebard, 1908)

Species of praying mantis

Yersiniops sophronicus, common name Yersin's ground mantis, is a species of praying mantis native to North America.

== See also ==
- List of mantis genera and species
