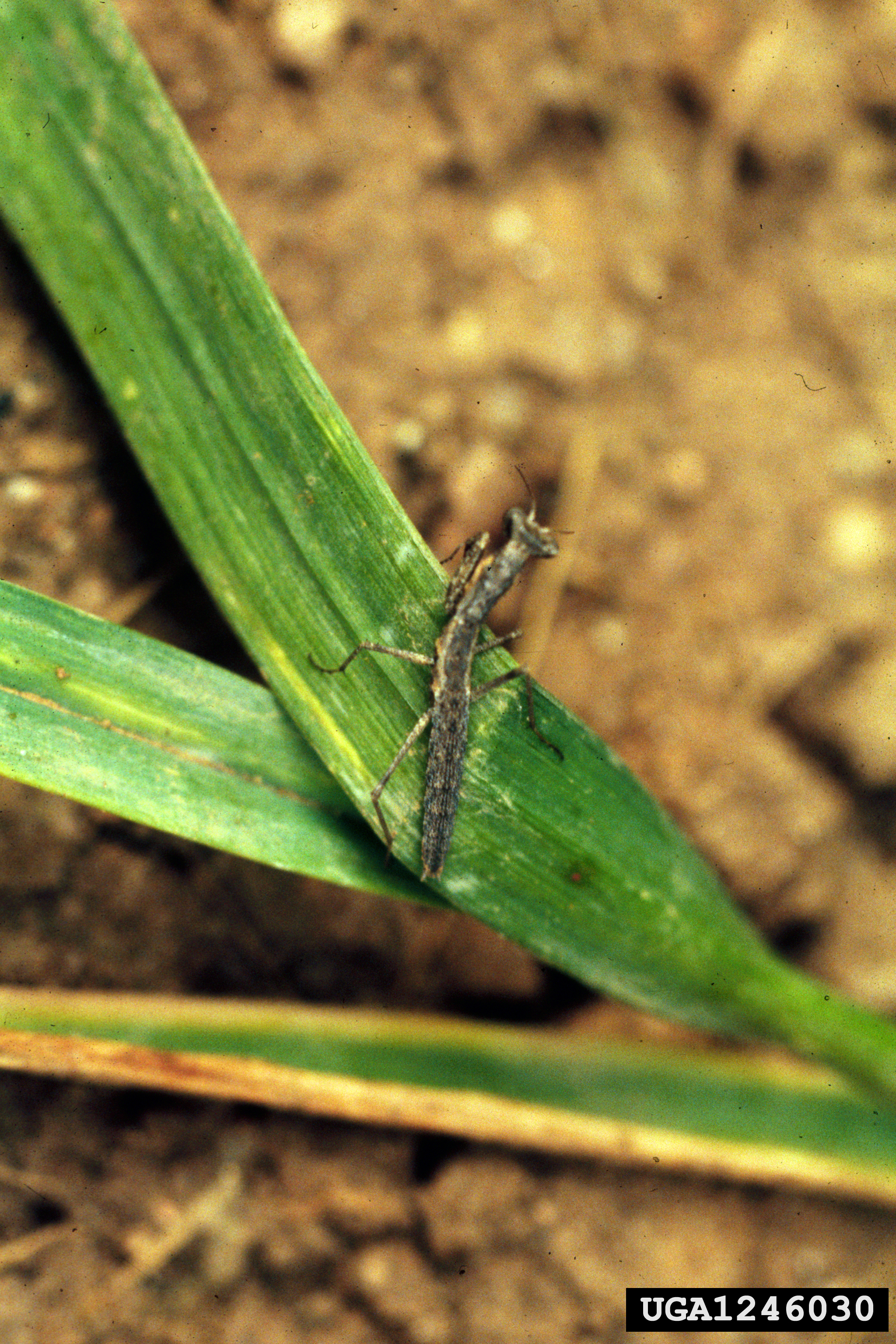

Scientific classification
- Kingdom: Animalia
- Phylum: Arthropoda
- Clade: Pancrustacea
- Class: Insecta
- Order: Mantodea
- Family: Amelidae
- Genus: Litaneutria
- Species: L. minor

Binomial name
- Litaneutria minor Scudder, 1872

= Litaneutria minor =

Species of praying mantis

Litaneutria minor, or the agile ground mantis or minor ground mantid, is native to the drier regions of North America. L. minor is found in the Midwest of the United States through Texas and Mexico. They are very active hunters and will be seen running across the ground from early spring to late summer.

== Description ==
Males and females obtain a length of about 30 millimetres (1.2 in) in the wild. The adults are usually dark grey or dark tan in color. Outer ventral margin of fore femur has 4 spines, fore femur lacks groove typical to other mantids, long thin filamentous antennae.

Males have 8 abdominal segments with a brown spot near the base of the forewings. Females have 6 abdominal segments with a rough pronotum and have no wings, usually showing wing pads however. Males appear to have much more developed wings than females, yet, do not fly.

== Ecology ==
L. minor can be observed actively hunting on open ground during sunny days. Ground mantids have only been observed hunting either on the ground or on small shrubs a few centimeters above the ground surface.

As with all mantids, the front legs of L. minor are highly developed to grab and hold prey. The four spines on the fore femur and the spines on the tibia are developed to rapidly close on prey, holding the prey in a tight grip, while the mandibles begin eating the prey.

Nymphs can sometimes be cannibalistic as with most mantids, and begin hunting their first day. Young feed mainly on small flies, but as they grow, they will hunt down and attack anything that they can.

Typical food sources include: moths, flies, grasshoppers, katydids and crickets. Ground mantids have been observed chasing down prey, rather than adopting the normal praying mantis "sit and wait" hunting behavior.

== Life cycle ==
L. minor is a solitary species and like most other praying mantises will only come together to mate. Mating times for this species are highly dependent upon weather conditions and prey availability. Typically females are most likely to accept a mate and have a successful clutch two weeks after their last molt.

Male ground mantids will detect a female by following a pheromone released by a sexually mature female. Once a male has located a female, he slowly approaches her, being sure to distinguish himself as a mate and not a prey item, and mounts the female. L. minor is an extremely aggressive species and the female may sometimes mistake the potential mate for prey, and attack and eat the male. Once successfully on the back of the female, the male L. minor will bend his abdomen down, attaching his spermatophore into the female's spermatheca. Cannibalism during mating can be observed in many different species of mantids (usually 6-30% of the time) and Litaneutria minor is no exception, with nearly all females eating the male's head during mating. This unusually high percentage of cannibalism during mating is not common in most mantid species.

Two weeks after mating, the females lay egg cases known as ootheca on twigs and branches. The ootheca is 5–10 millimetres (0.2–0.4 in) long, with each ootheca containing 10–20 eggs. The eggs lay dormant over winter, and if they survive, nymphs will start emerging from the ootheca in early spring. Females will molt approximately 7 times, with their terminal molts being in mid to late summer. Males will molt only 6 times and will have a terminal molt mid to late summer also. Nymphs and juveniles spend all spring and early summer catching as much prey as possible and growing.

Adults reach sexual maturity in late summer and will mate as soon as they are sexually mature. Females begin laying eggs in late summer and early fall, and will continue to do so until both they and the males die out during the fall months. Only the fertile eggs last the winter, with the next generation emerging the following spring.

== Defence ==
Litaneutria minor uses its small size and dark coloration as its best defense against predators. Because of its dark coloration, it easily blends in with the small rocks, broken twigs and dark vegetation found in its territory. Its small size easily allows it to quickly run and hide under rocks or dense vegetation.

The agile ground mantis is extremely aggressive, and will defend itself against predators or unruly prey. It will extend its forearms out fully and stand as tall as possible to try to intimidate predators.

Many flying mantids have evolved a highly sensitive ear which is capable of detecting ultrasonic frequencies emitted by bats using echolocation. These ultrasonic frequencies range from 60 to 120 kHz and once detected by the mantis, the mantis can change its flight path into a series of random loops and twirls to try to evade the bat. L. minor however does not have a highly specialized ear and can only hear best at 30–50 kHz. This is because the mantis no longer has to use its ear to detect bats, because it no longer has the ability to fly.
