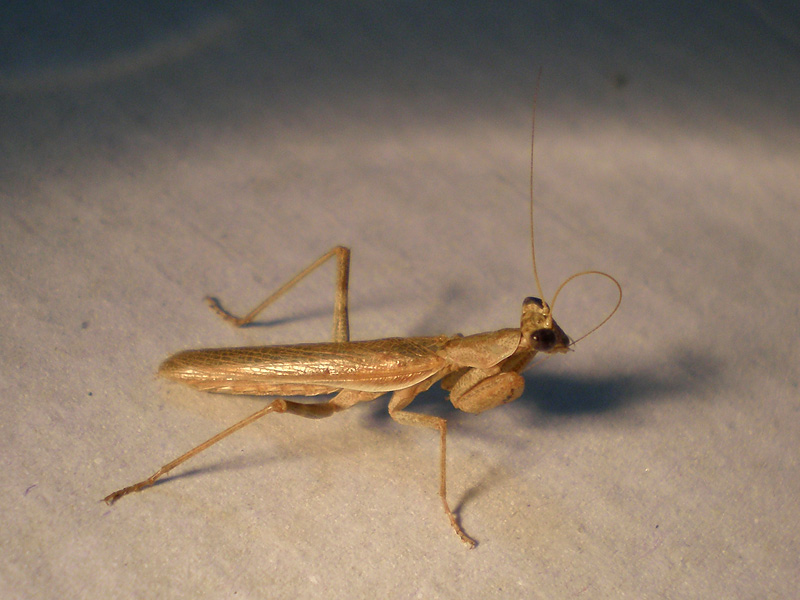
- Adult European dwarf mantis (A. spallanzania)

Scientific classification
- Kingdom: Animalia
- Phylum: Arthropoda
- Clade: Pancrustacea
- Class: Insecta
- Order: Mantodea
- Family: Amelidae
- Tribe: Amelini
- Genus: Ameles; Burmeister, 1838

Synonyms
- Apterameles Beier, 1950; Parameles Saussure, 1869

= Ameles =

Genus of praying mantises

Ameles is a wide-ranging genus of praying mantises represented in Africa, Asia, and Europe.

== Species ==
- Ameles aegyptiaca Werner, 1913
- Ameles arabica Uvarov, 1939
- Ameles assoi Bolivar, 1873
- Ameles decolor Charpentier, 1825
- Ameles dumonti Chopard, 1943
- Ameles fasciipennis Kaltenbach, 1963 – spined dwarf mantis
- Ameles gracilis (Brulle, 1838)
- Ameles heldreichi Brunner von Wattenwyl, 1882
- Ameles insularis Agabiti, Salvatrice & Lombardo, 2010
- Ameles kervillei Bolivar, 1911
- Ameles maroccana Uvarov, 1931
- Ameles massai Battiston & Fontana, 2005
- Ameles moralesi Bolivar, 1936
- Ameles paradecolor Agabiti, Salvatrice & Lombardo, 2010
- Ameles persa Bolivar, 1911
- Ameles picteti Saussure, 1869
- Ameles poggii Lombardo, 1986
- Ameles spallanzania Rossi, 1792 – European dwarf mantis
- Ameles serpentiscauda Battiston, Maioglio, Corneti, Forni & Luchetti, 2025
- Ameles syriensis Giglio-Tos, 1915
- Ameles wadisirhani Kaltenbach, 1982
