= Ameles dumonti =

Scientific classification
- Kingdom: Animalia
- Phylum: Arthropoda
- Clade: Pancrustacea
- Class: Insecta
- Order: Mantodea
- Family: Amelidae
- Genus: Ameles
- Species: A. dumonti

Binomial name
- Ameles dumonti Chopard, 1943

Species of praying mantis

Ameles dumonti is a species of praying mantis that inhabits Tunisia and Morocco.
