= Turpilia rostrata =

Scientific classification
- Kingdom: Animalia
- Phylum: Arthropoda
- Clade: Pancrustacea
- Class: Insecta
- Order: Orthoptera
- Suborder: Ensifera
- Family: Tettigoniidae
- Subfamily: Phaneropterinae
- Genus: Turpilia
- Species: T. rostrata

Binomial name
- Turpilia rostrata (Rehn & Hebard, 1905)

Species of cricket-like animal

Turpilia rostrata, the narrow-beaked katydid, is a species of phaneropterine katydid in the family Tettigoniidae. It is found in North America.
