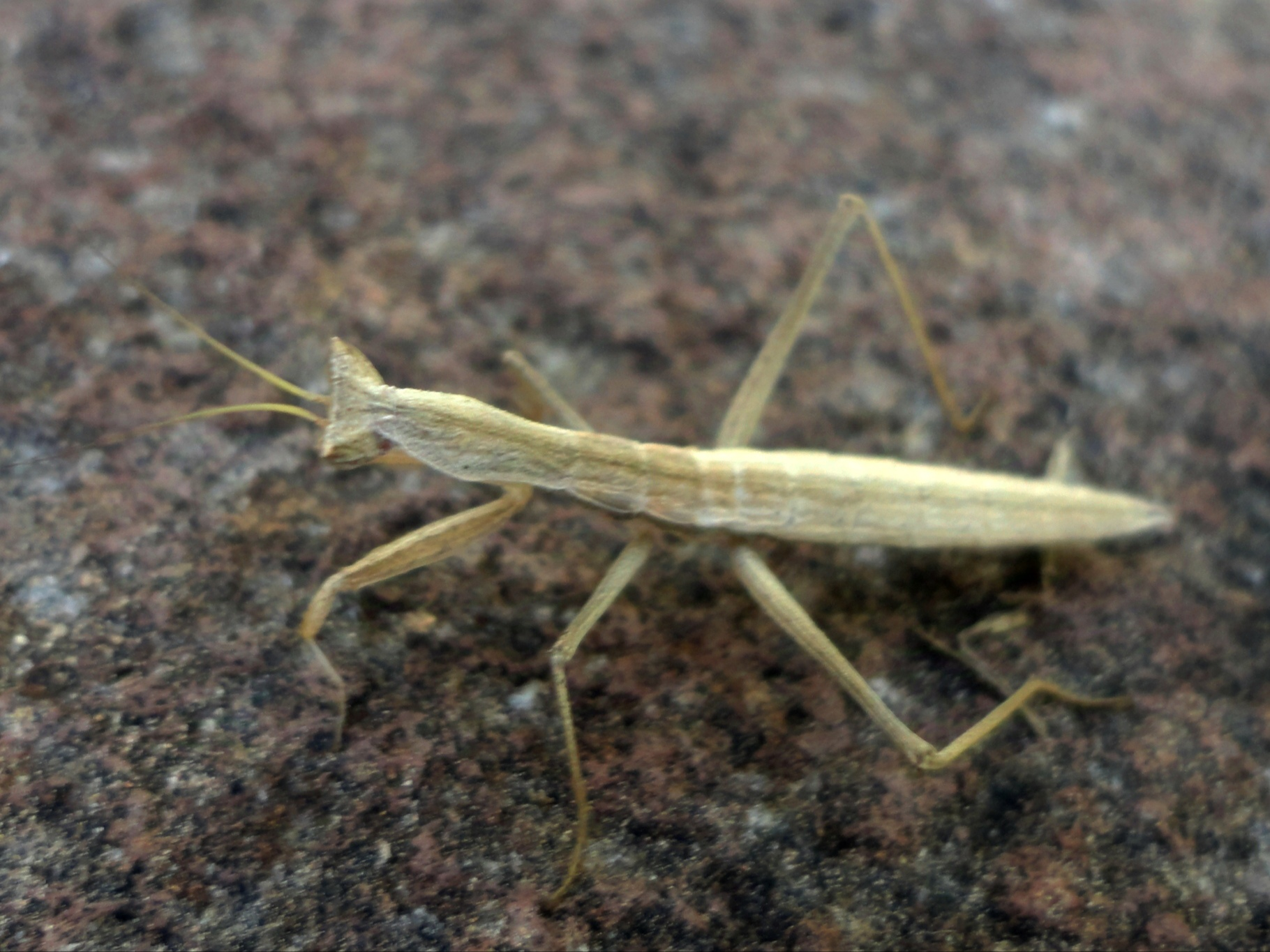

Scientific classification
- Kingdom: Animalia
- Phylum: Arthropoda
- Clade: Pancrustacea
- Class: Insecta
- Order: Mantodea
- Family: Amelidae
- Genus: Yersinia; Saussure, 1869
- Species: Y. mexicana

Binomial name
- Yersinia mexicana Saussure, 1869

Synonyms
- Genus: Ameles Saussure, 1871; Species: Yersinia aztecus Saussure, 1859

= Yersinia (mantis) =

Genus of insect

Yersinia is a monotypic genus of mantis from the family Amelidae. It is found from Mexico through Nicaragua.

The genus is represented by the single species, Yersinia mexicana, commonly known as the Mexican jumping mantis.
