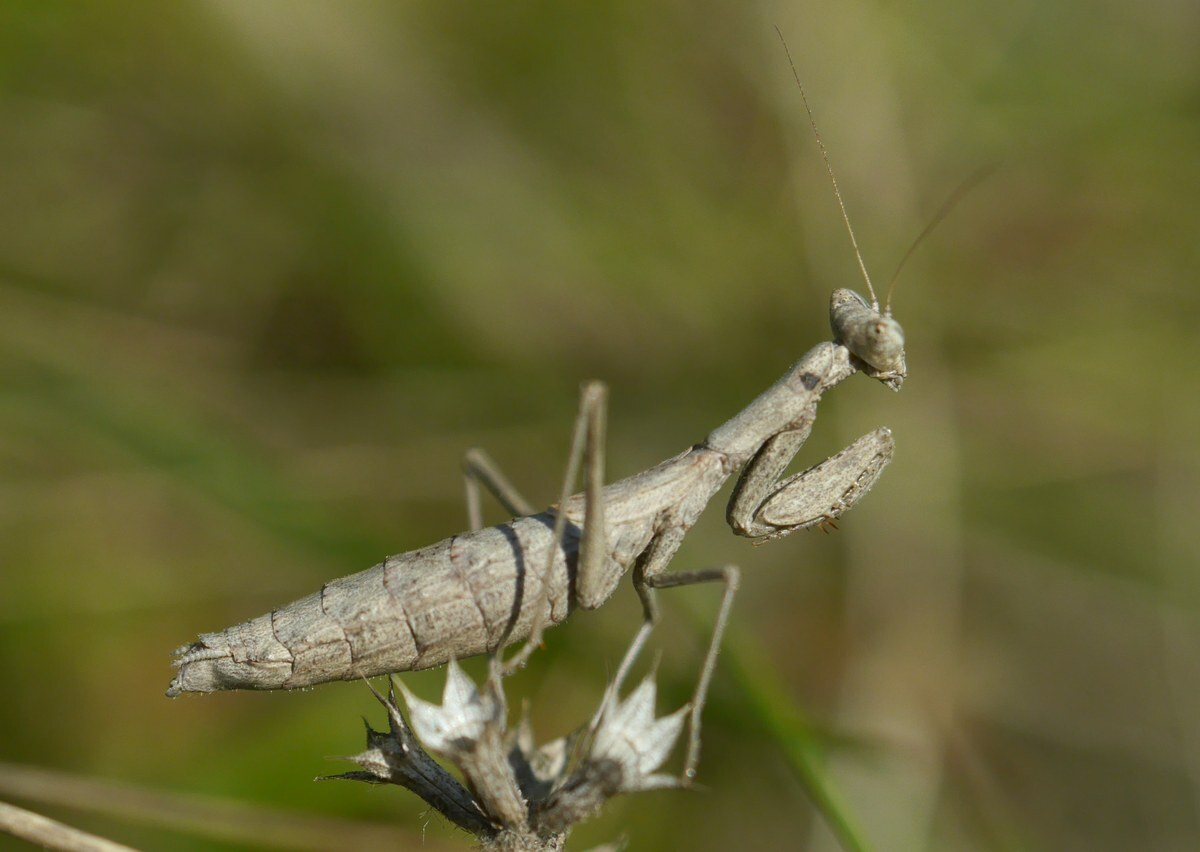

Conservation status
- Least Concern (IUCN 3.1)

Scientific classification
- Kingdom: Animalia
- Phylum: Arthropoda
- Clade: Pancrustacea
- Class: Insecta
- Order: Mantodea
- Family: Amelidae
- Genus: Ameles
- Species: A. heldreichi

Binomial name
- Ameles heldreichi Brunner von Wattenwyl, 1882

Synonyms
- Ameles cyprica Uvarov, 1936; Ameles rammei Beier, 1950; Ameles taurica Jakovlev, 1903; Apterameles rammei Beier, 1950

= Ameles heldreichi =

Species of praying mantis

Ameles heldreichi is a species of praying mantis that lives in Bulgaria, North Macedonia, Croatia, Greece, Israel, Libya, Palestine, Turkey, Romania, Ukraine, Russia and Cyprus. Type locality is Putini (Croatia).
