= Cándido Bolívar Pieltain =

Spanish naturalist and entomologist

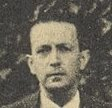
- C. Bolívar Pieltain in Madrid, 1935
- Born: April 15, 1897; Madrid
- Died: November 22, 1976 (aged 79); Mexico City
- Education: Universidad Complutense de Madrid
- Father: Ignacio Bolívar
- Scientific career
- Fields: Entomology

Cándido Luis Bolívar Pieltain (15 April 1897 – 22 November 1976) was a Spanish naturalist and entomologist.

== Biography ==
He studied in Ciudad Real. When he was 14, his article “Observaciones sobre algunas cuevas del Norte de España y descripción de una nueva especie de ‘Speocharis’” was published in the Boletín de la Real Sociedad Española de Historia Natural. When he was 17 years old, he went to the Universidad Complutense de Madrid, to study sciences. In 1924, he married Amelia Goyanes and they had six children. He travelled to Italy, Greece, Morocco and the United States..

After the Spanish Civil War, he moved to Mexico, where he died in 1976.

== Publications ==
- Trabajos del Museo Nacional de Ciencias Naturales. Serie zoológica, Anales de la Real Sociedad Española de Historia Natural, Eos, Ciencia.
- Ciencia. Revista hispano-americana de Ciencias puras y aplicadas. In Mexico.
