= Pozuelo de Calatrava =

Municipality in Ciudad Real, Castile-La Mancha, Spain

Coordinates: 38°35′N 3°50′W

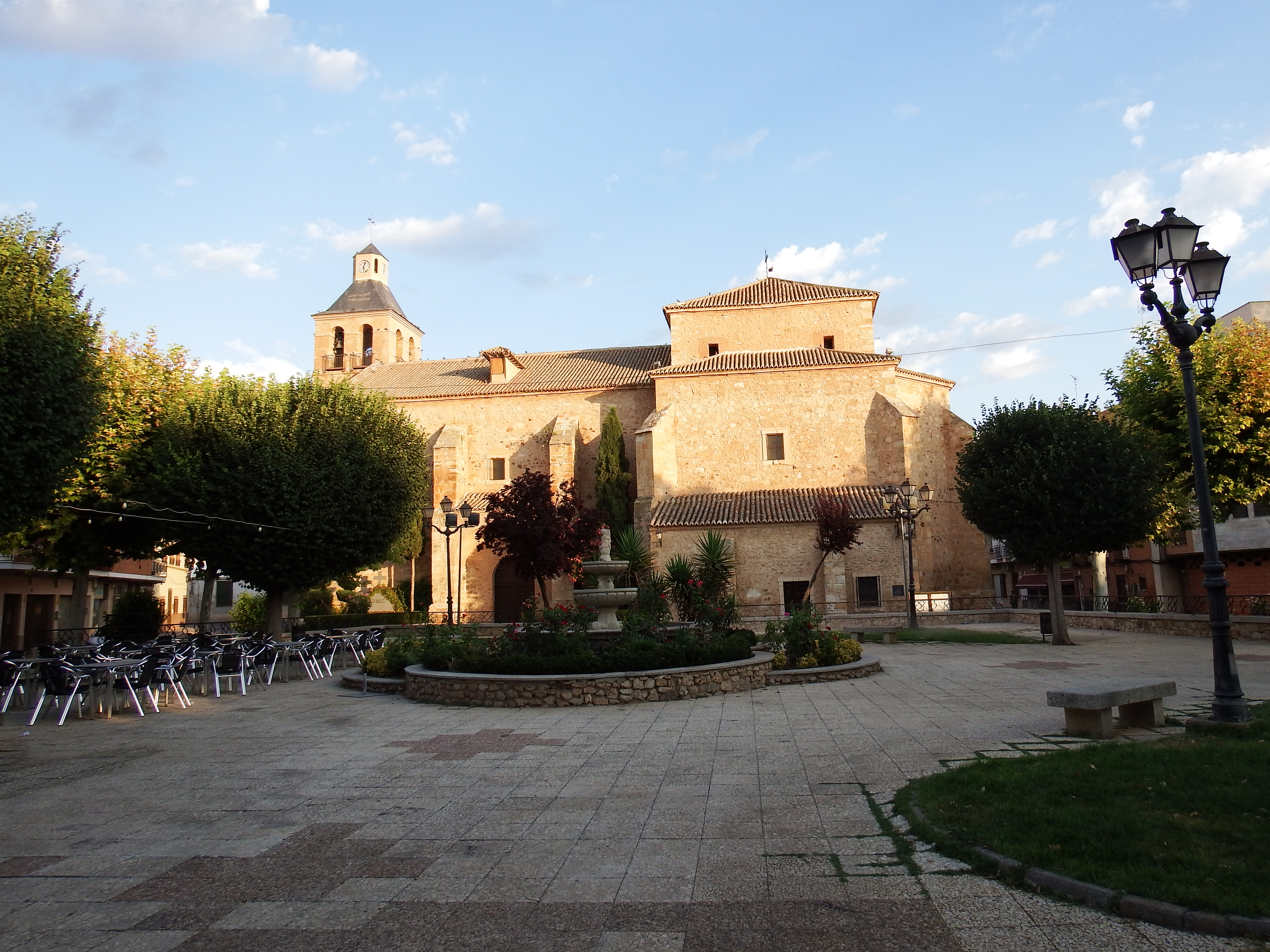

Coat of arms of Pozuelo de Calatrava

Pozuelo de Calatrava is a municipality in Ciudad Real, Castile-La Mancha, Spain. It has a population of 2,602.

== Notable person ==
José María Hugo de la Fuente Morales (1855–1932), entomologist
