= John George Wood =

English writer (1827–1889)

The Reverend John George Wood
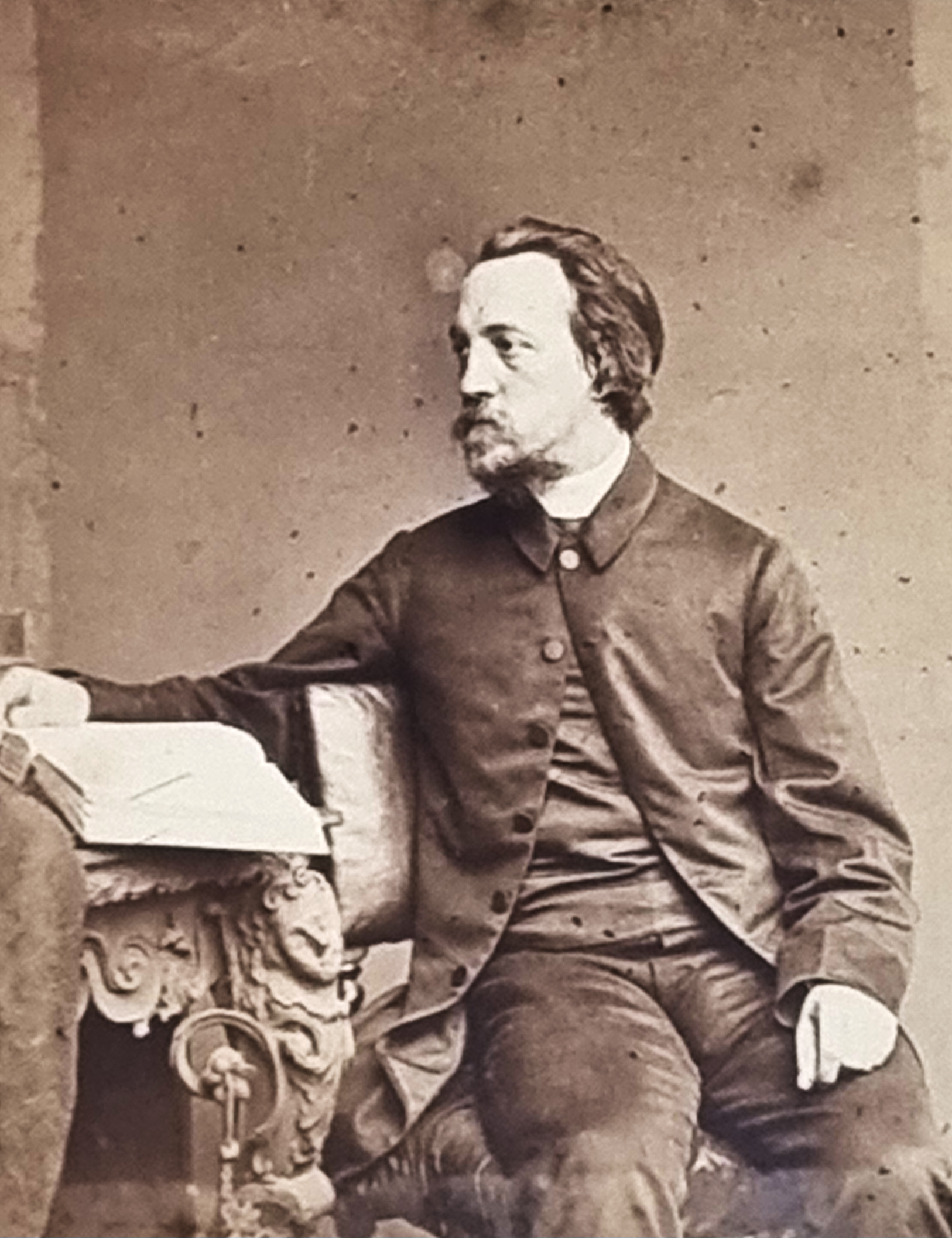
- Reverend John George Wood, c. 1866, by Ernest Edwards
- Born: 21 July 1827; London, England
- Died: 3 March 1889 (aged 61); Coventry, England
- Occupation: Novelist
- Writing career
- Notable works: Common Objects of the Microscope; Animal Traits and Characteristics; Common Objects of the Country; The Uncivilized Races, or Natural History of Man

John George Wood, or Reverend J. G. Wood, (21 July 1827 – 3 March 1889), was an English writer who popularised natural history with his writings. His son Theodore Wood (1863–1923) was also a canon and naturalist.

== Life and work ==
=== Early life and ordination ===
John George Wood was born in London, son of the surgeon John Freeman Wood and his German-born wife Juliana Lisetta Arntz. His parents moved with him to Oxford the following year, and he was educated at home, at Ashbourne Grammar School and Merton College, Oxford (B.A., 1848, M.A., 1851), and then at Christ Church, where he worked for some time in the anatomical museum under Sir Henry Acland. In 1852 he became curate of the parish of St Thomas the Martyr, Oxford, and in 1854 was ordained priest; he also took up the post of chaplain to the Boatmen's Floating Chapel at Oxford. Among other benefices which he held, he was for a time chaplain to St. Bartholomew's Hospital. In 1878 Wood settled in Upper Norwood, where he lived until his death.

=== Parson-naturalist ===
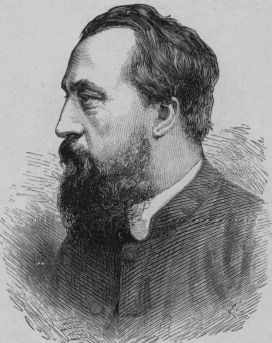
Rev. J. G. Wood

In 1854, Wood gave up his curacy to devote himself to writing on natural history, becoming a well-known parson-naturalist of the Victorian era. However, he continued to take on priestly work, as in 1858 he accepted a readership at Christ Church, Newgate Street, and was assistant-chaplain to St Bartholomew's Hospital, London, from 1856 until 1862. Between 1868 and 1876 he was precentor to the Canterbury Diocesan Choral Union.

After 1876 he devoted himself to the production of books and lecturing on zoology, which he illustrated by drawing on a black-board or on large sheets of white paper with coloured crayons. These "sketch lectures," as he called them, were very popular, and made his name widely known both in Great Britain and in the United States.

Wood gave occasional lectures from 1856. In 1879, however, he began lecturing as a second profession, and continued to lecture steadily until 1888 in the United Kingdom and elsewhere. He delivered the Lowell Lectures in Boston, Massachusetts, in 1883-4.

== Natural history populariser ==
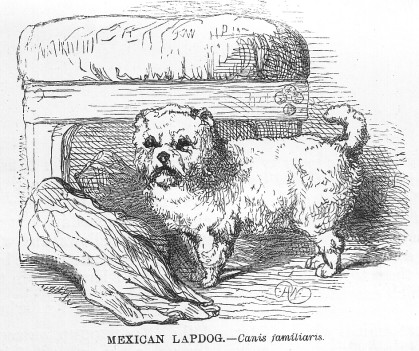
Mexican lapdog from: the Illustrated Natural History (Mammalia). The Rev J G Wood, 1853.

Wood was a prolific and successful natural history writer, though rather as a populariser than as a scientist. For example, his book Common Objects of the Country sold 100,000 copies in a week. Among his works are Common Objects of the Microscope; Illustrated Natural History (1853); Animal Traits and Characteristics (1860); Common Objects of the Sea Shore (1857); The Uncivilized Races, or Natural History of Man (1868) (to which Mark Twain refers in his humorous work Roughing It); Out of Doors (1874) (a book that was quoted by Sir Arthur Conan Doyle in his Sherlock Holmes story "The Adventure of the Lion's Mane"); Field Naturalist's Handbook (with his son Theodore Wood) (1879–80); books on gymnastics and sport; and an edition of Gilbert White's Natural History of Selborne. He also edited The Boys Own Magazine.

Wood died at Coventry on 3 March 1889.

== Works ==
- Sketches and Anecdotes of Animal Life, London: George Routledge and Co., 1856
- Bees; Their Habits, Management and Treatment, London: George Routledge and Sons, 1860 (Books for the Country)
- Common Objects of the Microscope, London: George Routledge and Sons, 1861
- Our Garden Friends and Foes, London: Routledge, Warne and Routledge, 1864
- The Common Objects of the Country, London: George Routledge and Sons, 1866
- Bible Animals, being a Description of Every Living Creature Mentioned in the Scriptures, from the Ape to the Coral..., London: Longmans, Green, Reader and Dyer, 1869
- Insects Abroad, London: Longmans, Green and Co., 1874
- Man And Beast Here And Hereafter, 2 vols., London: Daldy, Isbister & Co., 1874
- Insects at Home, London: Longmans, Green, 1876
- Nature's Teachings: Human Invention Anticipated by Nature, London: Daldy, Isbister & Co., 1877
- Lane and Field, London: Society for the Promotion of Christian Knowledge, 1879 (Natural Rambles Series)
- Hardy Perennials and Old Fashioned Flowers, London: L. Upcott Gill, 1884
- Popular Natural History, Philadelphia: Porter & Coates, 1885
- Story of the Bible Animals, Philadelphia: Office of Charles Foster's Publications, 1888
- Half Hours with a Naturalist: Rambles Near the Shore, London: Charles Burnet & Co., 1889
- Natural History, London: George Routledge and Sons, 1894

Further works are listed at the end of Rev. Wood's DNB article (see page 367).

== Sources ==
- Whittington-Egan, Richard (2014). The Natural History Man: A Life of the Reverend J. G. Wood. Cappella Archive, Malvern. ISBN 9781-902918-60-0.
