= Turpilia =

Scientific classification
- Kingdom: Animalia
- Phylum: Arthropoda
- Clade: Pancrustacea
- Class: Insecta
- Order: Orthoptera
- Suborder: Ensifera
- Family: Tettigoniidae
- Subfamily: Phaneropterinae
- Genus: Turpilia; Stål, 1874

Genus of cricket-like animals

Turpilia is a genus of phaneropterine katydids in the family Tettigoniidae. There are about nine described species in Turpilia.

== Species ==
These nine species belong to the genus Turpilia:

- Turpilia albineura Zayas, 1965
- Turpilia appendiculata Brunner von Wattenwyl, 1878
- Turpilia obtusangula Brunner von Wattenwyl, 1878
- Turpilia opaca Brunner von Wattenwyl, 1878
- Turpilia plana (Walker, 1869)
- Turpilia punctata Stål, 1874
- Turpilia rostrata (Rehn & Hebard, 1905) (narrow-beaked katydid)
- Turpilia rugulosa Brunner von Wattenwyl, 1878
- Turpilia vigens (Walker, 1869)
