= Hardy Perennials and Old Fashioned Flowers =

1884 book by John George Wood

Hardy Perennials and Old Fashioned Flowers—Describing the Most Desirable Plants, for Borders, Rockeries, and Shrubberies
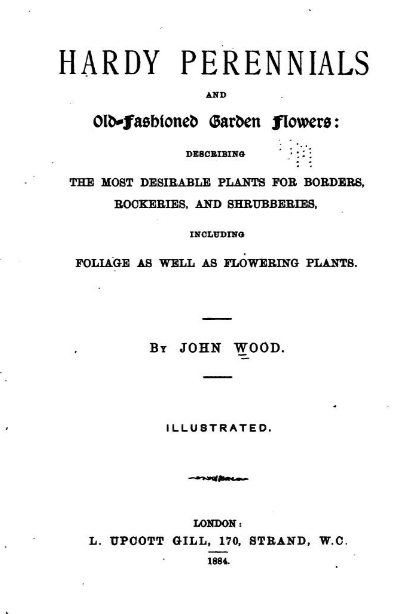
- Title page for Hardy Perennials and Old Fashioned Flowers—Describing the Most Desirable Plants, for Borders, Rockeries, and Shrubberies (1884)
- Author: John Wood
- Genre: Horticulture
- Publisher: L. Upcott Gill
- Publication date: 1884

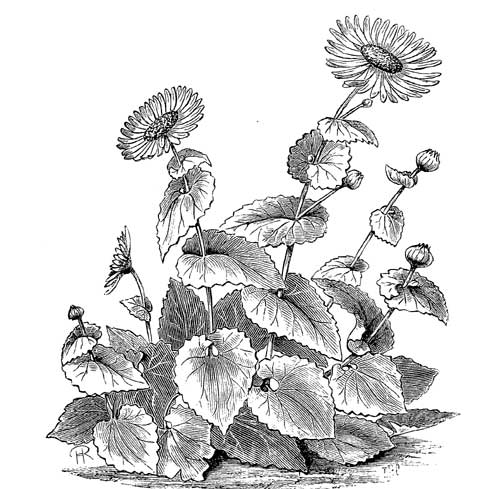
The book contains over 100 illustrations, including this Doronicum caucasicum.

Hardy Perennials and Old Fashioned Flowers—Describing the Most Desirable Plants, for Borders, Rockeries, and Shrubberies is a horticulture and gardening book by John Wood, published in 1884 in London by L. Upcott Gill. The book consists of descriptions of common British flowers, organised alphabetically by their scientific name. The first volume was released in April 1883. The book was put online by the Project Gutenberg Literary Archive Foundation in 2006.

A review in Nature was mediocre, expressing reservations about the bulk, cost, and spelling mistakes of the work. The Athenaeum was more positive, excusing mistakes because "the book has no pretensions to be a scientific treatise". The Saturday Review praised it as a detailed and practical gardening book.
