= José María Hugo de la Fuente Morales =

Spanish entomologist

José María de la Fuente
- Born: José María Hugo de la Fuente Morales; 1 April 1855; Pozuelo de Calatrava (Ciudad Real), Spain
- Died: 21 June 1932 (aged 77); Pozuelo de Calatrava (Ciudad Real), Spain
- Education: Seminaries of Toledo and Jaén
- Known for: Classification of insects
- Parent(s): Ildefonso de la Fuente Villanueva and Anastasia Ramona Morales Hornero
- Scientific career
- Fields: Priest and entomologist

José María Hugo de la Fuente Morales (1 April 1855 – 21 June 1932) was a Spanish entomologist.

== Biography ==
Born in Pozuelo de Calatrava (Ciudad Real), Spain, son of the Madrilenian doctor Ildefonso de la Fuente Villanueva and Pozuelo de Calatrava native Anastasia Ramona Morales Hornero, he was the second of nine children, of whom only four reached adulthood.

He began training as a priest by studying Latin in Moral Calatrava, and completed his studies in the seminaries of Toledo and Jaén. During breaks in these studies, he sent an insect, identified by him as Pycnogaster graellsi (an orthopteran in the subfamily Bradyporinae), to Ignacio Bolivar Urrutia, professor of entomology at the Central University, Madrid. Urrutia, after confirming Morales's accurate identification, sent him three trays of insects to encourage him in his investigations and to identify new species that he might find. That excited the scientific sense of the young seminarist, and so started him on the path which led to his becoming one of the European leaders in entomology.

He was a priest in Ciudad Real in 1879, and he moved to Almagro in 1888. There he dedicated himself to adding to his collection of reptiles and amphibians and composed a booklet of poetry that is conserved in the Museum of Ciudad Real. After about a year in Ciudad Real he became co-assistant of the parish of San Bartholomew between 1890 and 1891. Finally he fulfilled his great desire, expressed in his poetry, to return as a priest to his town, Pozuelo de Calatrava, where he was assigned permanently. He began intensive entomological activity, for which he learned different languages in order to understand the specialized bibliography. There he also completed an important library specializing in entomology of more than four hundred volumes in several languages and an important collection of insects that is also conserved with other works in the Museum of Ciudad Real.

Two years later, the Royal Spanish Society of Natural History arrived in Pozuelo to begin a collaboration. The first communication appeared in the Actas of 1893, with the description of two new species of Orthoptera. A visit to the bath of Archena in Murcia because of his rheumatism led to his discovery of a great number of new species. In 1897, he began to publish Datos para la fauna de la provincia de Ciudad Real.

== Works ==
- Catálogo sistemático-geográfico de los coleópteros observados en la Península Ibérica, Pirineos propiamente dichos y Baleares (1918–1932)
- Tablas analíticas para la clasificación de los coleópteros de la Península Ibérica. Barcelona: Imprenta Altés, 1927.
- La fauna de la provincia de Ciudad Real Ciudad Real: Tipografía del Hospicio Provincial, 1929.
