= Ameles aegyptiaca =

Scientific classification
- Kingdom: Animalia
- Phylum: Arthropoda
- Clade: Pancrustacea
- Class: Insecta
- Order: Mantodea
- Family: Amelidae
- Genus: Ameles
- Species: A. aegyptiaca

Binomial name
- Ameles aegyptiaca Werner, 1913

Species of praying mantis

Ameles aegyptiaca, the Egyptian ameles, is a species of mantis native to Egypt.
