= Ignacio Bolívar =

Spanish naturalist and entomologist

The Most Excellent Ignacio Bolívar
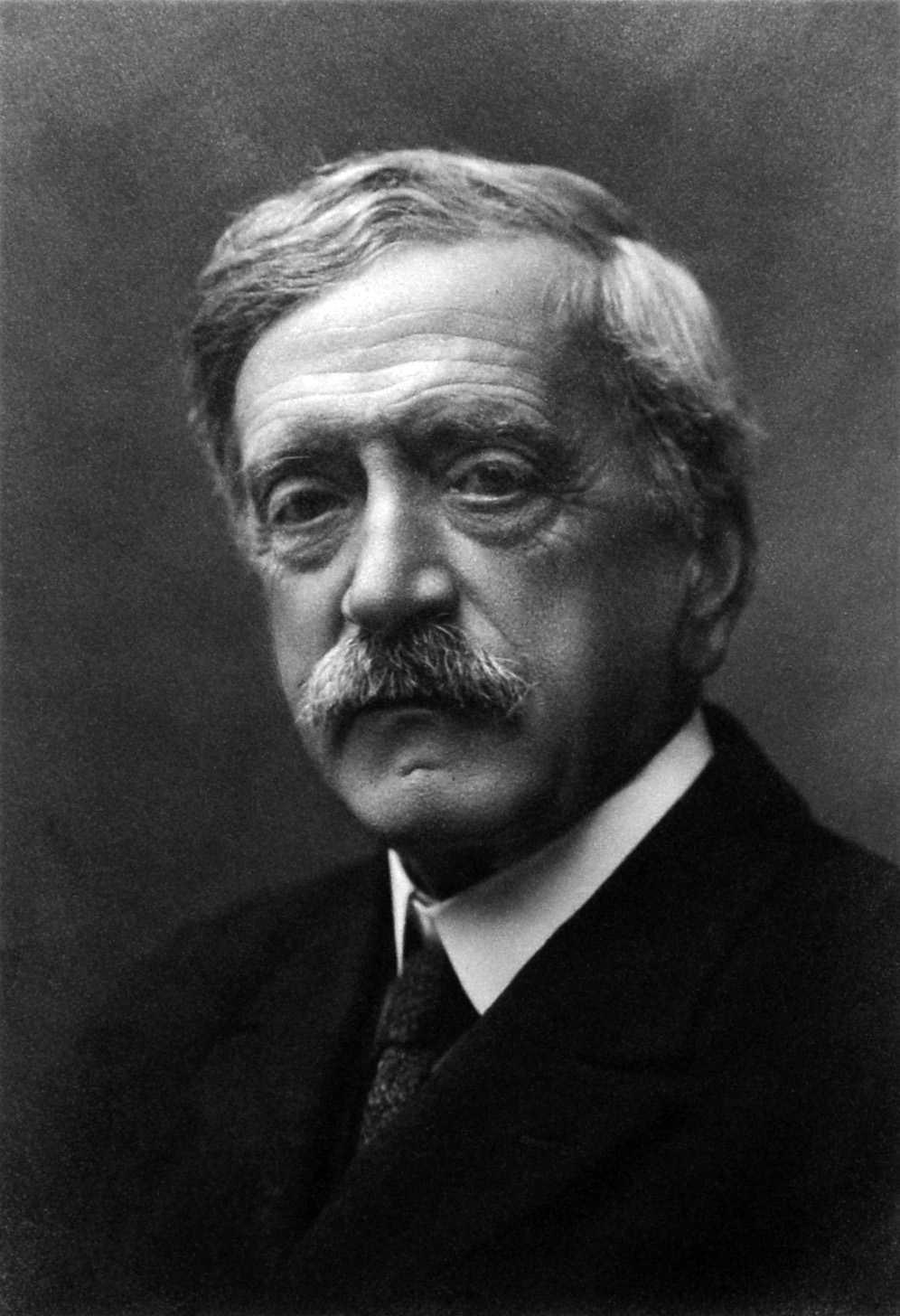
- Born: Ignacio Bolívar y Urrutia; 9 November 1850; Madrid, Spain
- Died: 19 November 1944 (aged 94); Mexico City, Mexico
- Children: Cándido Bolívar Pieltain

Seat F of the Real Academia Española
- In office 18 January 1931 – 19 November 1944
- Preceded by: Eduardo Gómez de Baquero
- Succeeded by: Emilio Fernández Galiano

Ignacio Bolívar y Urrutia (Spanish pronunciation: [iɣˈnasjo βoˈliβaɾjuˈrutja]; 9 November 1850 – 19 November 1944) was a Spanish naturalist and entomologist, and one of the founding fathers of Spanish entomology. He helped found the Real Sociedad Española de Historia Natural (Royal Spanish Natural History Society) in 1871, and was the author of several books and of over 1000 species.

He also encouraged other naturalists to study entomology, José María de la Fuente being one example. In this field he wrote more than 300 books and monographs and described more than thousand new species and about 200 genera.

After the Spanish Civil War he was exiled to Mexico when the nationalist government harshly repressed Republican militants and sympathisers. Here he was made Doctor honoris of the National Autonomous University of Mexico. In Mexico he was devoted mainly to entomology and founded in 1940 the journal Ciencia (Science).

== Scientific work ==
His more important works include: Ortópteros de España nuevos o poco conocidos (1873) and Catálogo sinóptico de los ortópteros de la fauna ibérica (1900).
