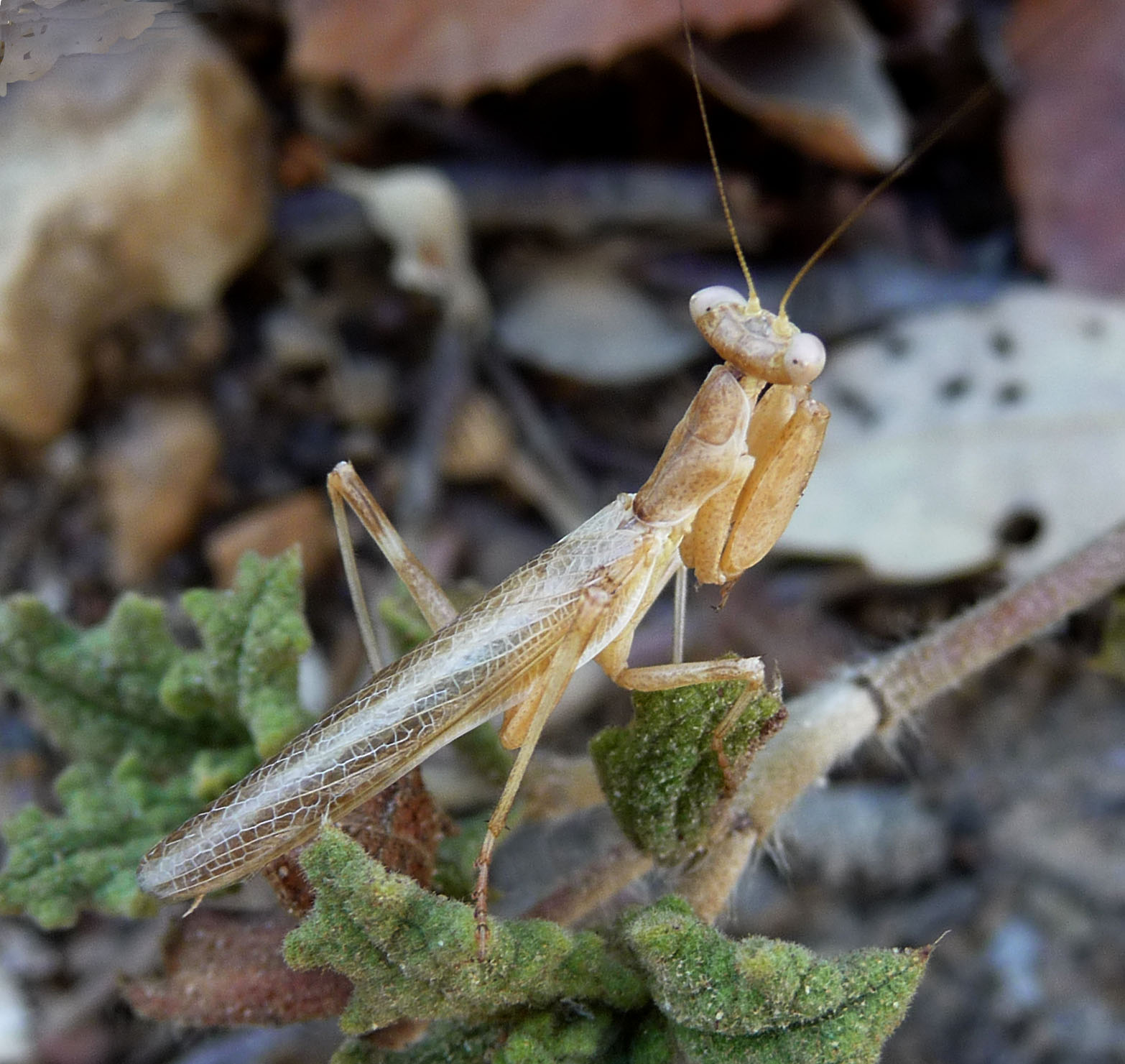
- Ameles sp.

Scientific classification
- Kingdom: Animalia
- Phylum: Arthropoda
- Clade: Pancrustacea
- Class: Insecta
- Order: Mantodea
- Superfamily: Eremiaphiloidea
- Family: Amelidae; Giglio-Tos, 1919

= Amelidae =

Family of praying mantises

The Amelidae are a family of praying mantids. Its genera were previously placed in the family Mantidae. Species have been recorded from Africa, Asia, Europe and North America.

== Genera ==
The Mantodea Species File lists a single subfamily Amelinae, comprising two tribes:

=== Amelini ===
- Ameles Burmeister, 1838
- Apteromantis Werner, 1931
- Pseudoyersinia Kirby, 1904

=== Litaneutriini ===
- Litaneutria Saussure, 1892
- Yersinia Saussure, 1869 - monotypic Yersinia mexicana Saussure, 1859
- Yersiniops Hebard, 1931

=== Fossil species ===
- Litaneutria pilosuspedes Terriquez et al. 2022
