= Bushman poison =

Bushman poison can refer to a number of plants or insects used as ingredients by the San people when preparing arrow poisons:

- Toxicodendron species of the Western Cape province
- Bushman's poison, Acokanthera spectabilis
- Bushman's poison, Acokanthera oblongifolia
- Bushman's poison, Acokanthera oppositifolia
- Bushman's poison, Acokanthera venenata, of the south and east coasts of South Africa

Also see genus Acokanthera

Succulents:

The Gifboom Euphorbias:

- Euphorbia avesmantana
- Euphorbia virosa

The Pylgif or Bushman poison:

- Adenium boehmianum

Insects:

- A beetle genus, Diamphidia
