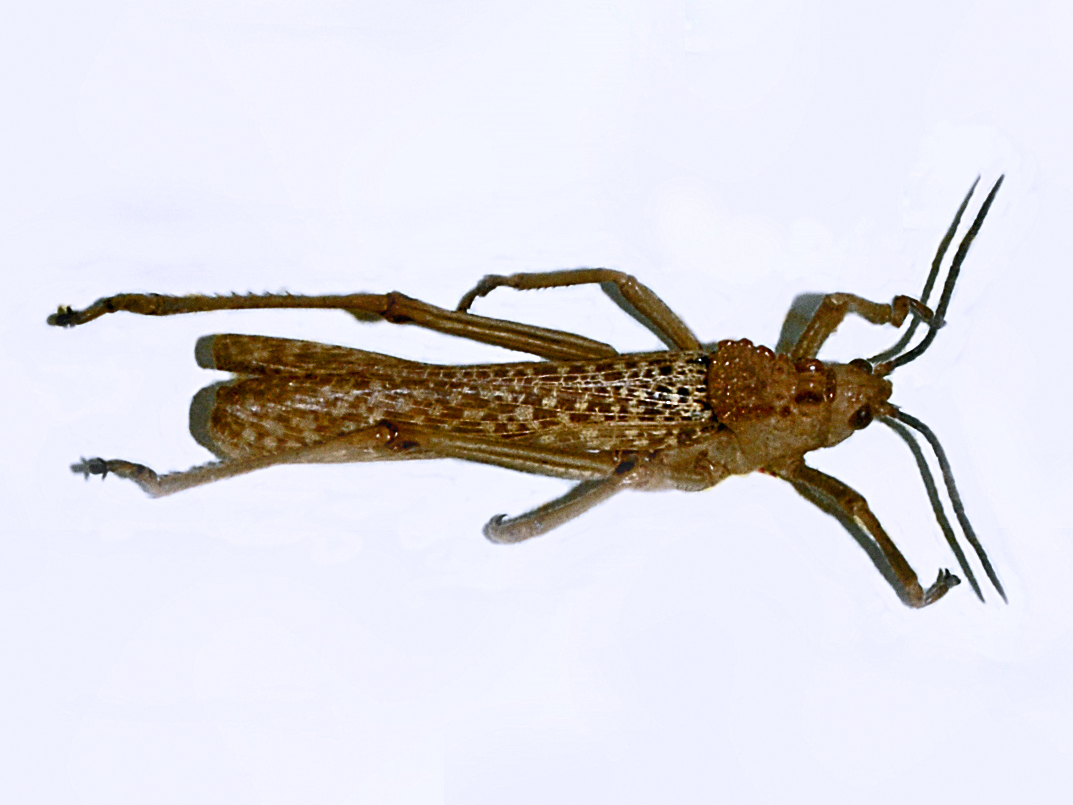
- Museum specimen
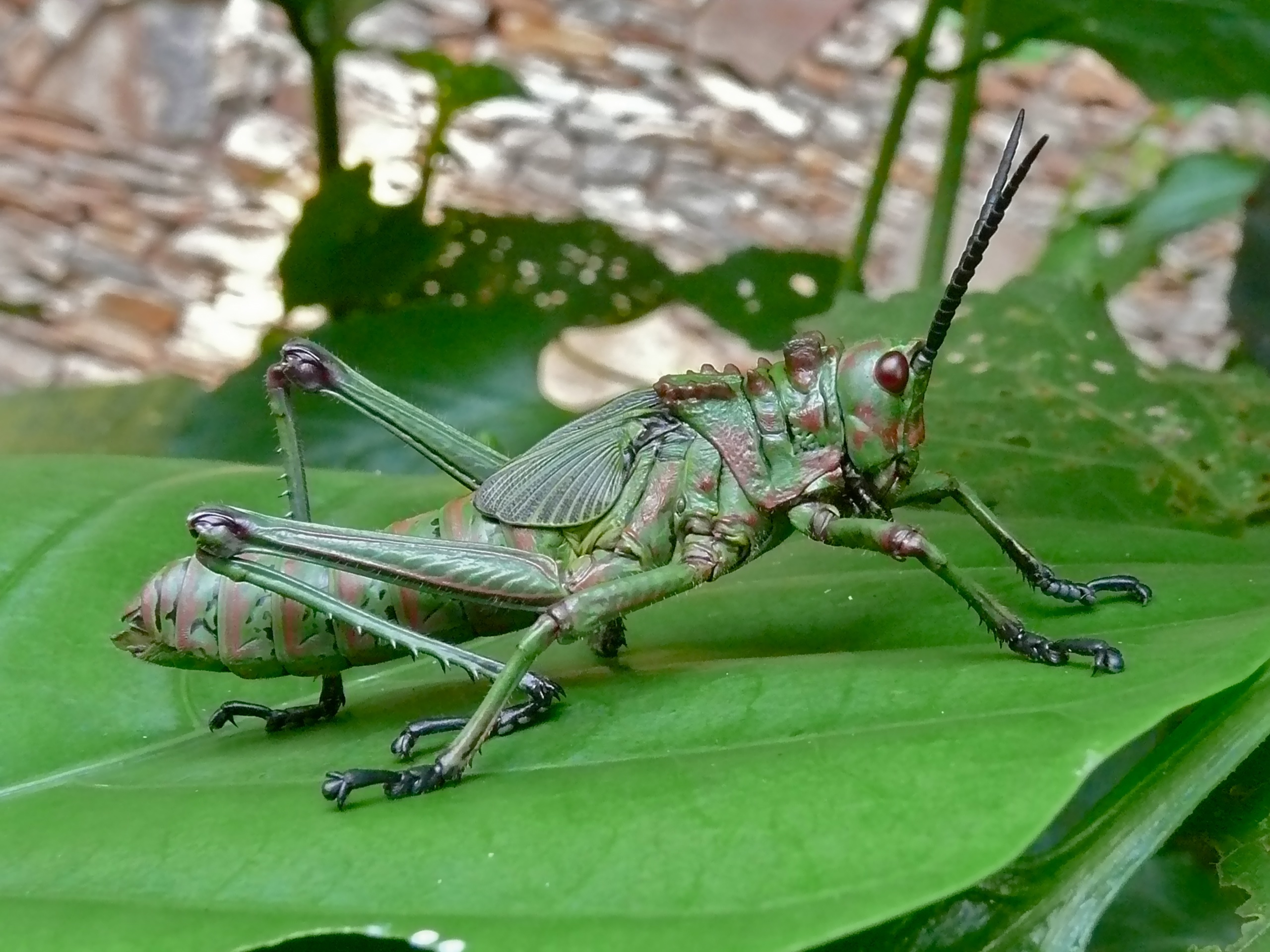
- Nymph

Scientific classification
- Domain: Eukaryota
- Kingdom: Animalia
- Phylum: Arthropoda
- Class: Insecta
- Order: Orthoptera
- Suborder: Caelifera
- Family: Pyrgomorphidae
- Subfamily: Pyrgomorphinae
- Tribe: Phymateini
- Genus: Phymateus
- Species: P. aegrotus

Binomial name
- Phymateus aegrotus (Gerstaecker, 1869)

Synonyms
- Poecilocera aegrota Gerstaecker, 1869; Phymateus hildebrandti Brunner von Wattenwyl, 1884

= Phymateus aegrotus =

Species of grasshopper

Phymateus aegrotus, sometimes called the blue bush locust or East African bush locust, is a pest species of grasshopper in the family Pyrgomorphidae. Unlike "locusts" the adults are not known to change their morphology on crowding, but at the hopper stage, marching behaviour of small bands may occur.

== Distribution ==
This species is present in Africa, Northeast Tropical Africa, Somalia.

== Description ==
Phymateus aegrotus can reach a length of 80–100 millimetres (3.1–3.9 in) in males, of 60–80 millimetres (2.4–3.1 in) in females. Body is green in colour, while fore-wings are blackish and yellowish. The nymphs (hoppers) in the first instars are mostly black with several small yellowish markings, while in the last instar they are bright green.

== Biology ==
P. aegrotus lay eggs in the substrate (humus-sand mix), The eggs hatch after about 12 months. The life expectancy of adult animals is of 8–12 months. They are capable of long migratory flights.

As with other Phymateus species it raises and rustles its wings when disturbed and may secrete a noxious fluid from its thoracic joint. Insects feed on Asclepias sp.. and bittersweet nightshade, Cestrum nocturnum.

== Bibliography ==
- Bolívar, I. (1884) Monografía de los pirgomorfinos, Anales de la Sociedad Española de Historia Natural (An. Soc. Espan. Hist. Nat.) 13:1-73, 418–500
- Bolívar, I. (1903) El género "Phymateus" Thunberg, Boletín de la Real Sociedad Española de Historia Natural (Bol. R. Soc. Esp. Hist. Nat.) 3:188-192
- Dirsh (1956-1958[) Missione biologica Sagan-Omodiretta dal Prof. Edoardo Zavattari: Acridoidea, Rivista di Biologia Coloniale (Riv. Biol. colon.) 16:61-66
- Dirsh (1965), The African Genera of Acridoidea, Cambridge University Press, Antilocust Centre, London 579 pp.
- Griffini (1897) Intorno ad alcuni Ortotteri raccolti dal Rev. L. Jalla a kazungula (Alto Zambesi), Bollettino dei Musei di Zoologia ed Anatomia Comparata della R. Università di Torino (Boll. Musei Zool. Anat. Comp. R. Univ. Torino) 12(290):1-12
- Hemp, C. (2009) Annotated list of Caelifera (Orthoptera) of Mt. Kilimanjaro, Journal of Orthoptera Research (Jour. Orth. Res.) 18(2):183–214
- Johnston, H.B. (1956), Annotated catalogue of African grasshoppers, The Cambridge University Press, Cambridge 833 pp.
- Johnston, H.B. (1968), Annotated catalogue of African grasshoppers, The Cambridge University Press, Cambridge Suppl:448 pp.
- Kevan, D.K.M. (1949) Notes on East African bush locusts with special reference to Phymateus aegrotus (Gerstaecker, 1869) (Orth. Acrid., Pyrgomorphinae), Bull. Ent. Res., London (Bull. Ent. Res.) 40:359-369
- Kevan, D.K.M. (1957) Orthoptera-Caelifera from northern Kenya and Jubaland. II. Pamphagidae, Pyrgomorphidae, Lentulidae and Romaleinae, Opuscula Entomologica, Lund (Opuscula Entomologica) 22:193-208
- Kevan, D.K.M. (1962), Proc. Calif. Acad. Sci. 31
- Kevan, D.K.M. [Ed.] In Beier [Ed.] (1977) Superfamily Acridoidea, fam. Pyrgomorphidae, Orthopterorum Catalogus, Orthopterorum Catalogus 16:1-656
- OrthopteraSF: Orthoptera Species File. Eades D.C., Otte D., Cigliano M.M., Braun H., 2010-04-28
- Rehn, J.A.G. (1901) The Acrididae, Tettigonidae and Gryllidae collected by Dr. A. Donaldson Smith in Northeast Africa, Proceedings of the Academy of Natural Sciences, Philadelphia (Proc. Acad. Nat. Sci. Philad.) 53:370-382
