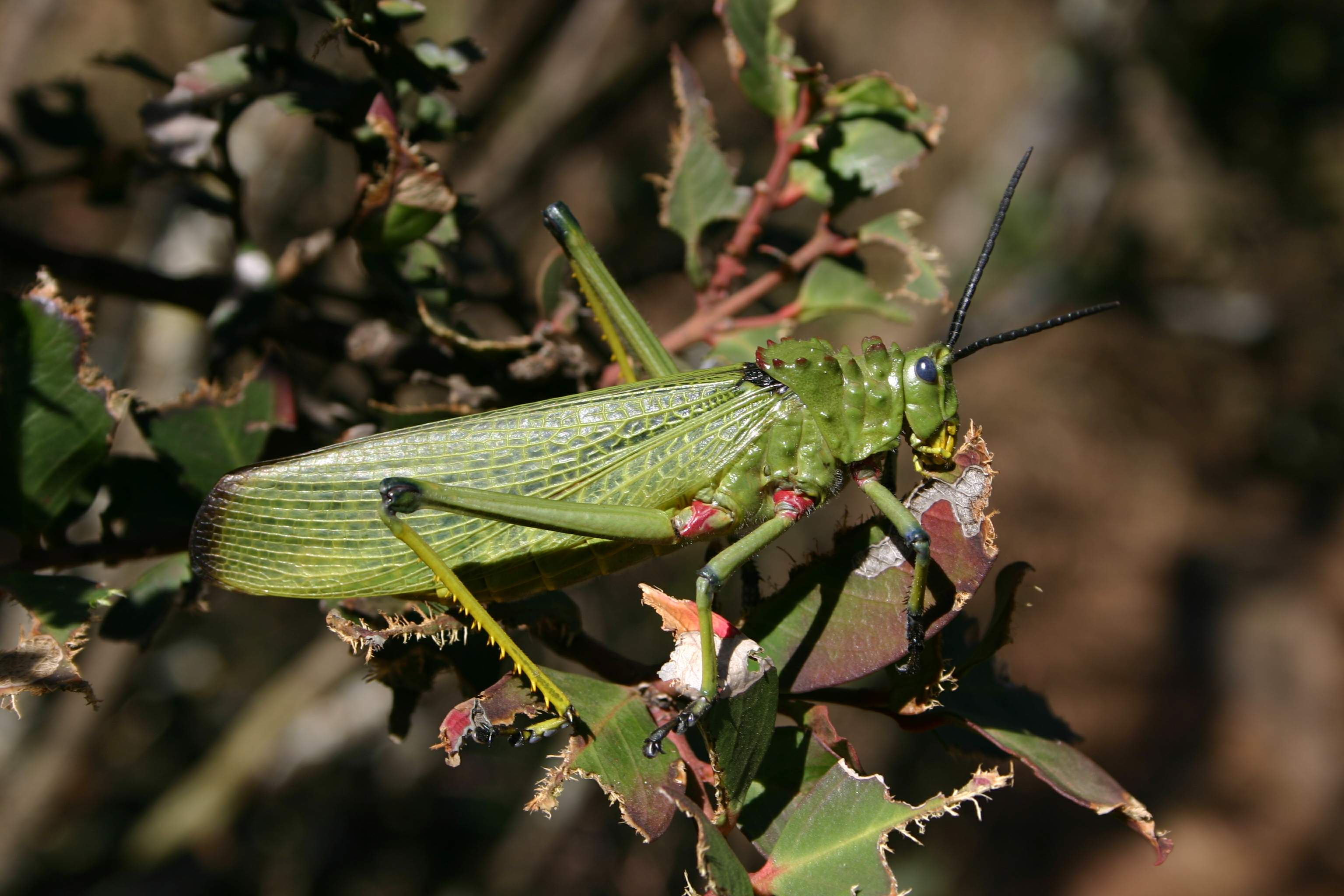
- Feeding on leaves of Acokanthera oppositifolia

Scientific classification
- Domain: Eukaryota
- Kingdom: Animalia
- Phylum: Arthropoda
- Class: Insecta
- Order: Orthoptera
- Suborder: Caelifera
- Family: Pyrgomorphidae
- Genus: Phymateus
- Species: P. viridipes

Binomial name
- Phymateus viridipes Stål, 1873

= Phymateus viridipes =

Green milkweed locust

Species of grasshopper

Phymateus viridipes, also known as the green milkweed locust or African bush grasshopper, is an African locust in the family Pyrgomorphidae (gaudy grasshoppers).

== Body characteristics ==
It is about 70 millimetres (2.8 in) long at maturity and capable of long migratory flights. Its body and fore-wings are green in colour while the hind-wings are bright red and blue, presenting a striking appearance in flight.

The pronotum, or dorsal area immediately behind the head, is covered in spines or carbuncles which are often tipped with red.

== Development ==
The nymphs or hoppers are bright yellow and black and highly gregarious, forming large groups during this growth stage and are more or less polyphagous.

== Behaviour ==
As with other Phymateus species it raises and rustles its wings when disturbed and may secrete a noxious fluid from its thoracic joint. This locust feeds on highly toxic plants such as Acokanthera oppositifolia, Cascabela thevetia and Secamone alpini. They congregate in large numbers on trees and shrubs, arranged in such a way as to resemble foliage.

== Gallery ==
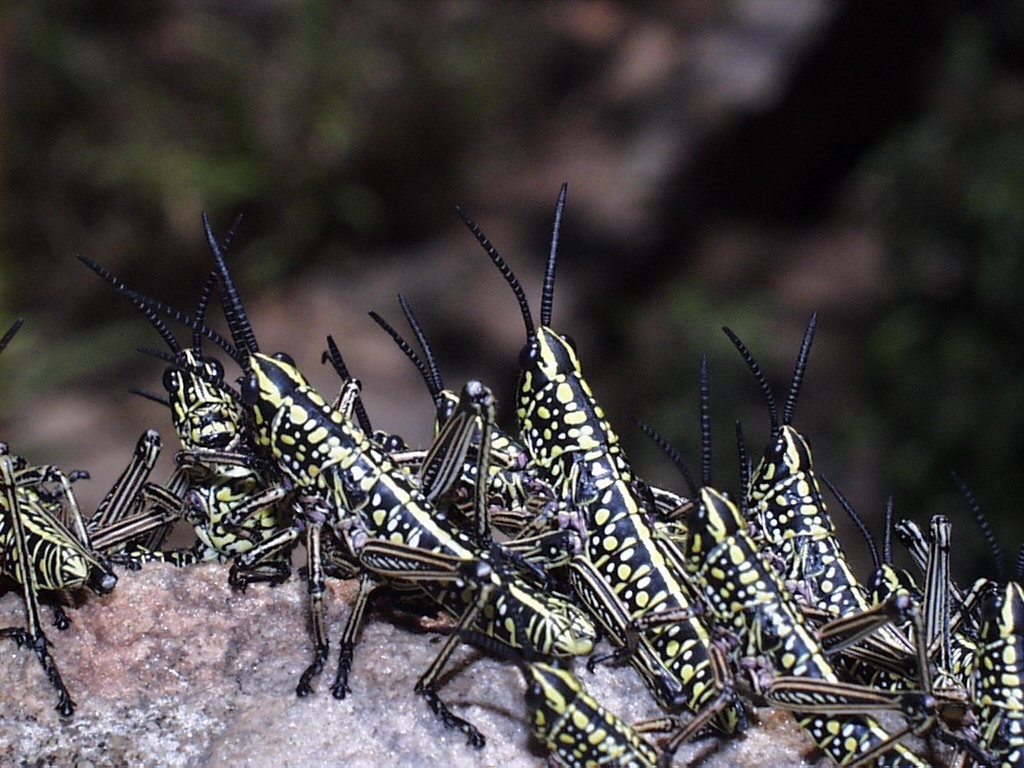
Nymphs

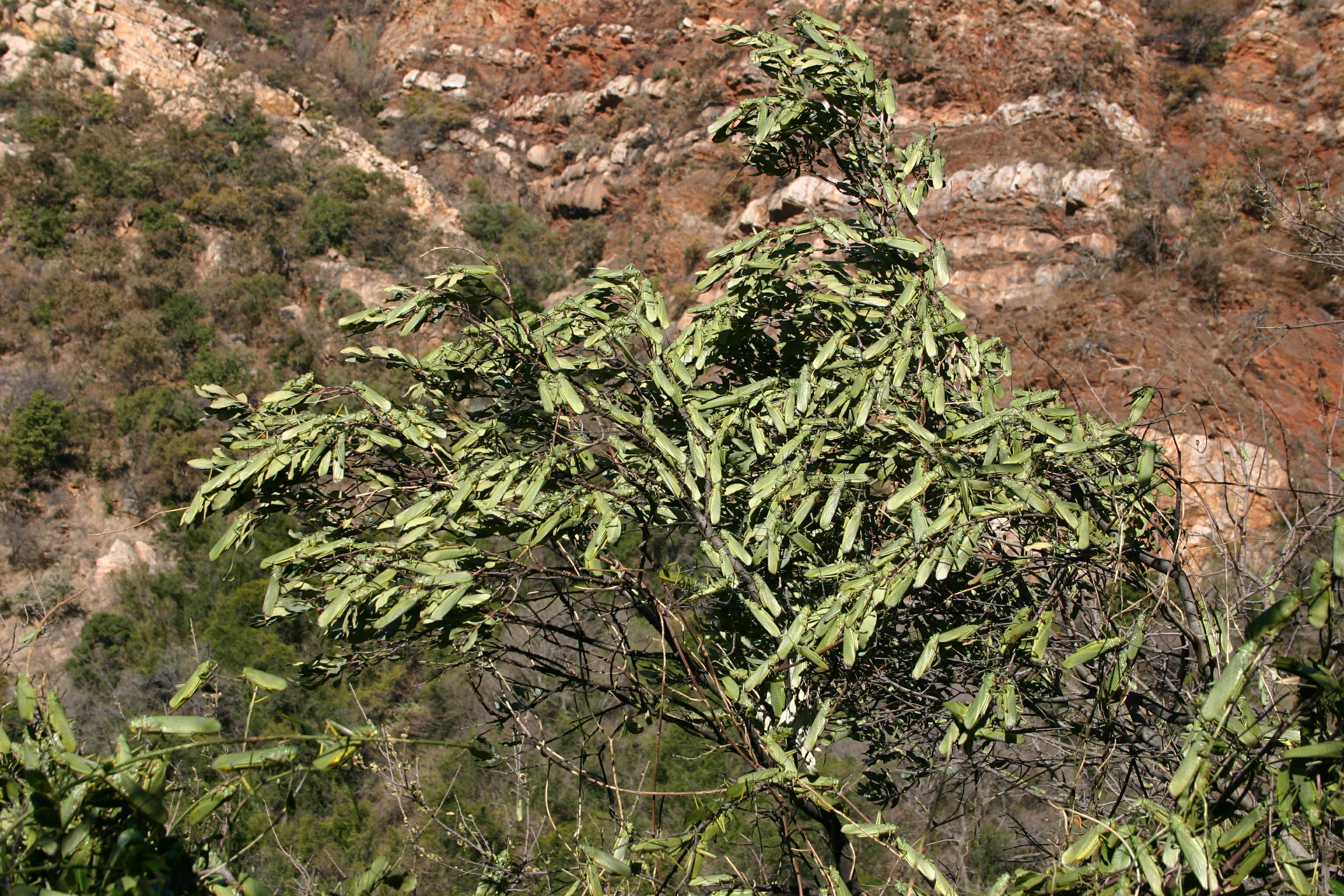
Assembling on Euclea crispa

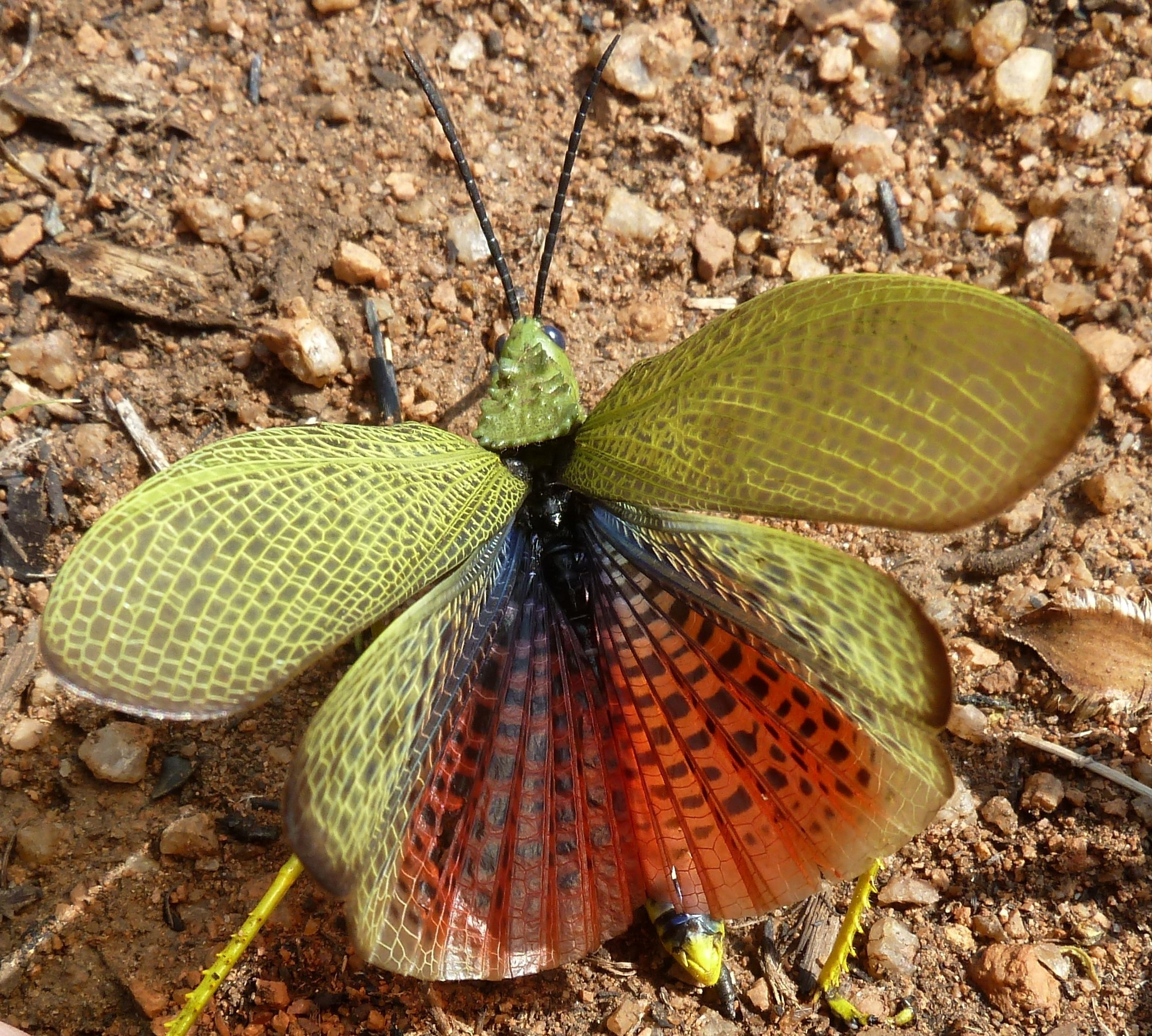
Display of warning colours
