= ATP12A =

Protein-coding gene in the species Homo sapiens

Identifiers
- Aliases: ATP12A, ATP1AL1, #945, HK, ATPase H+/K+ transporting non-gastric alpha2 subunit, H-K-ATPase
- External IDs: OMIM: 182360; MGI: 1926943; GeneCards: ATP12A
Enzyme activity
EC #	BRENDA	ExPASy	KEGG	MetaCyc
7.2.2.13	↗	↗	↗	↗
7.2.2.19	↗	↗	↗	↗

Gene location (Human)
Chr.	Chromosome 13 (human)
Band	13q12.12|13q12.1-q12.3	Start	24,680,408 bp
Band	13q12.12|13q12.1-q12.3	End	24,712,472 bp

Gene location (Mouse)
Chr.	Chromosome 14 (mouse)
Band	14|14 C3	Start	56,602,525 bp
Band	14|14 C3	End	56,626,007 bp
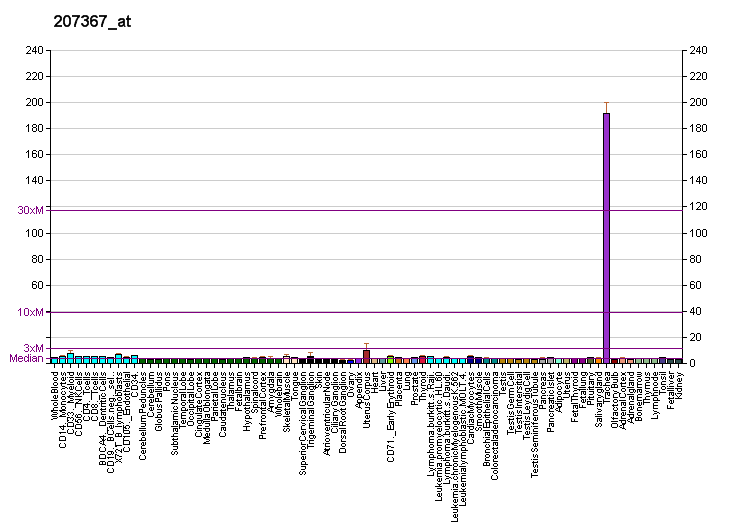
RNA expression pattern
Bgee	Human / Mouse (ortholog); Top expressed in: trachea; nasal epithelium; olfactory zone of nasal mucosa; epithelium of bronchus; epithelium of nasopharynx; bronchial epithelial cell; testicle; vulva; mucosa of paranasal sinus; oral cavity / Top expressed in: left colon; seminal vesicula; lip; cervix; skin of external ear; skin of abdomen; embryo; skin of back; left lung lobe; blastocyst; More reference expression data
BioGPS	More reference expression data
Gene ontology
Molecular function	nucleotide binding; metal ion binding; ATPase-coupled cation transmembrane transporter activity; hydrolase activity; ATP binding; P-type sodium:potassium-exchanging transporter activity; P-type potassium:proton transporter activity; P-type potassium transmembrane transporter activity
Cellular component	integral component of membrane; membrane; plasma membrane; basolateral plasma membrane; potassium:proton exchanging ATPase complex
Biological process	sodium ion transport; ion transport; potassium ion transport; potassium ion homeostasis; regulation of pH; establishment or maintenance of transmembrane electrochemical gradient; proton transmembrane transport; cellular sodium ion homeostasis; cellular potassium ion homeostasis; sodium ion export across plasma membrane; potassium ion import across plasma membrane; ion transmembrane transport
Sources:Amigo / QuickGO
Orthologs
Databases	NCBI: entry; OMA: entry
Species	Human	Mouse
Entrez	479	192113
Ensembl	ENSG00000075673	ENSMUSG00000022229
UniProt	P54707	Q9Z1W8
RefSeq (mRNA)	NM_001676; NM_001185085	NM_138652
RefSeq (protein)	NP_001172014; NP_001667	NP_619593
Location (UCSC)	Chr 13: 24.68 – 24.71 Mb	Chr 14: 56.6 – 56.63 Mb
PubMed search
- Wikidata
View/Edit Human	View/Edit Mouse

Potassium-transporting ATPase alpha chain 2 is a protein that in humans is encoded by the ATP12A gene.

== Function ==
The protein encoded by this gene belongs to the family of P-type cation transport ATPases. This gene encodes a catalytic subunit of the ouabain-sensitive H^{+}/K^{+} -ATPase that catalyzes the hydrolysis of ATP coupled with the exchange of H^{+} and K^{+} ions across the plasma membrane. It is also responsible for potassium absorption in various tissues.
