= C23H34O4 =

The molecular formula C_{23}H_{34}O_{4} may refer to:

- Androstenediol diacetate
- Calcitroic acid
- Digitoxigenin
- Prebediolone acetate
- Rostafuroxin
- Testosterone diacetate
