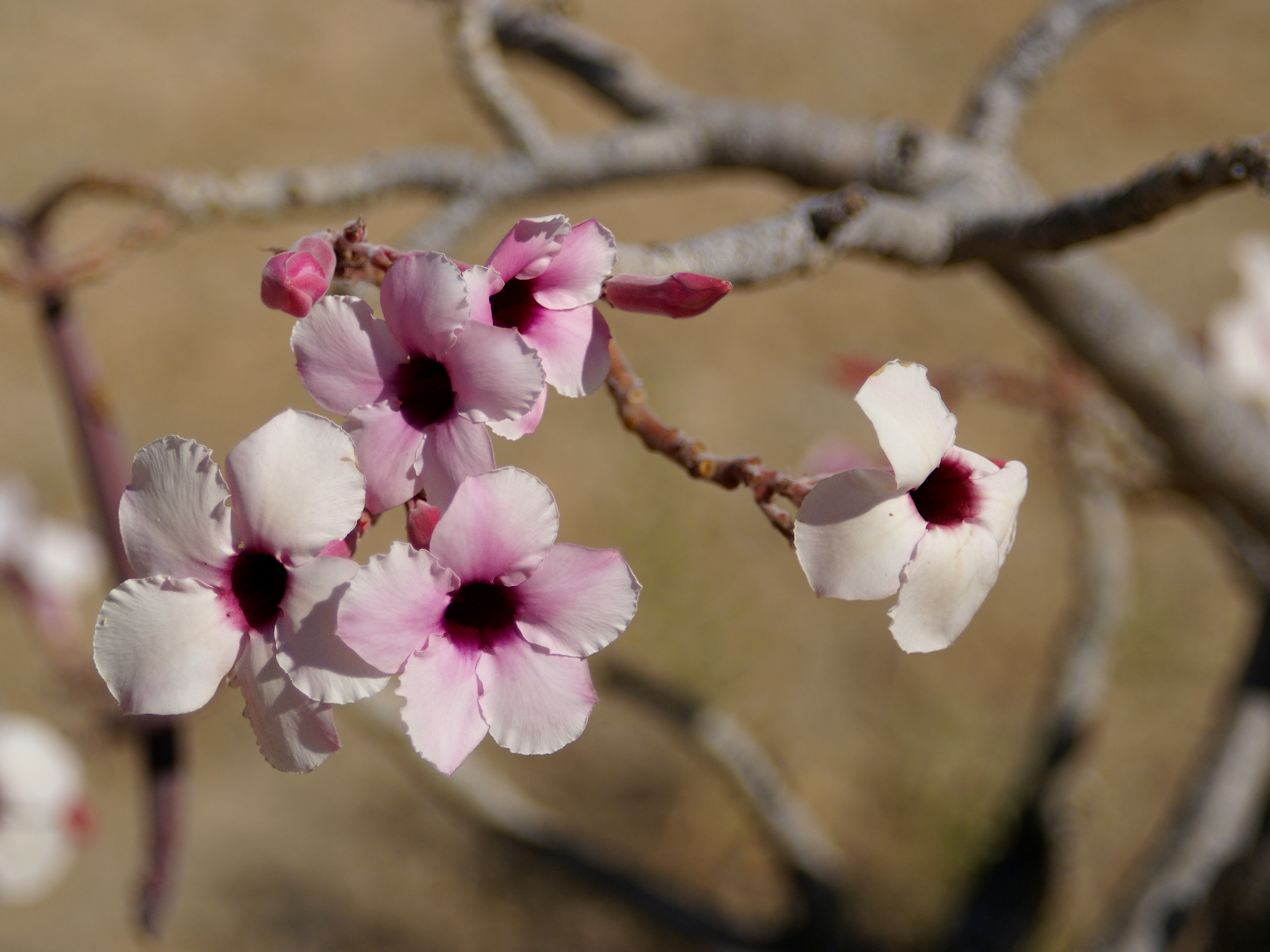
- In flower near the Cunene River, Namibia

Scientific classification
- Kingdom: Plantae
- Clade: Tracheophytes
- Clade: Angiosperms
- Clade: Eudicots
- Clade: Asterids
- Order: Gentianales
- Family: Apocynaceae
- Genus: Adenium
- Species: A. boehmianum

Binomial name
- Adenium boehmianum Schinz

= Adenium boehmianum =

Species of plant

Adenium boehmianum, the Bushman poison, is a poisonous succulent endemic to the mostly dry regions of northern Namibia and southern Angola. The San people boil the root sap and latex to prepare arrow poison, which is sufficient for hunting large mammals, as it contains strong cardiotoxic effects. The leaves, borne only for three months a year, are arranged spirally and are clustered near the branch tips. A plant will flower for only a few weeks in winter. The oblong fruit releases many seeds through a longitudinal slit, which due to their lateral tufts, can be dispersed by wind.

== See also ==
- Bushman poison (disambiguation)
