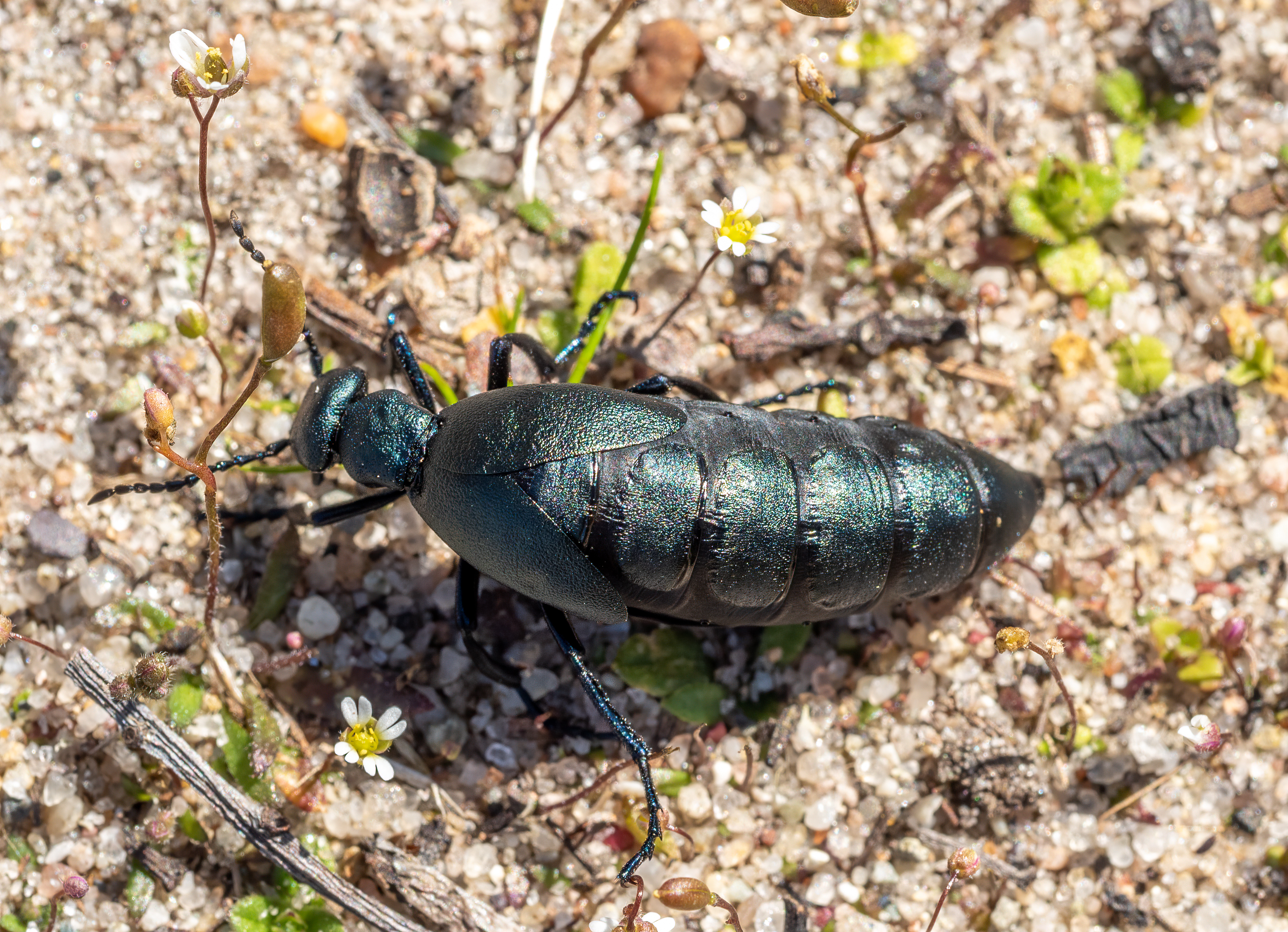
- In New York

Scientific classification
- Kingdom: Animalia
- Phylum: Arthropoda
- Class: Insecta
- Order: Coleoptera
- Suborder: Polyphaga
- Infraorder: Cucujiformia
- Family: Meloidae
- Genus: Meloe
- Species: M. americanus

Binomial name
- Meloe americanus Leach, 1815

= Meloe americanus =

Species of beetle

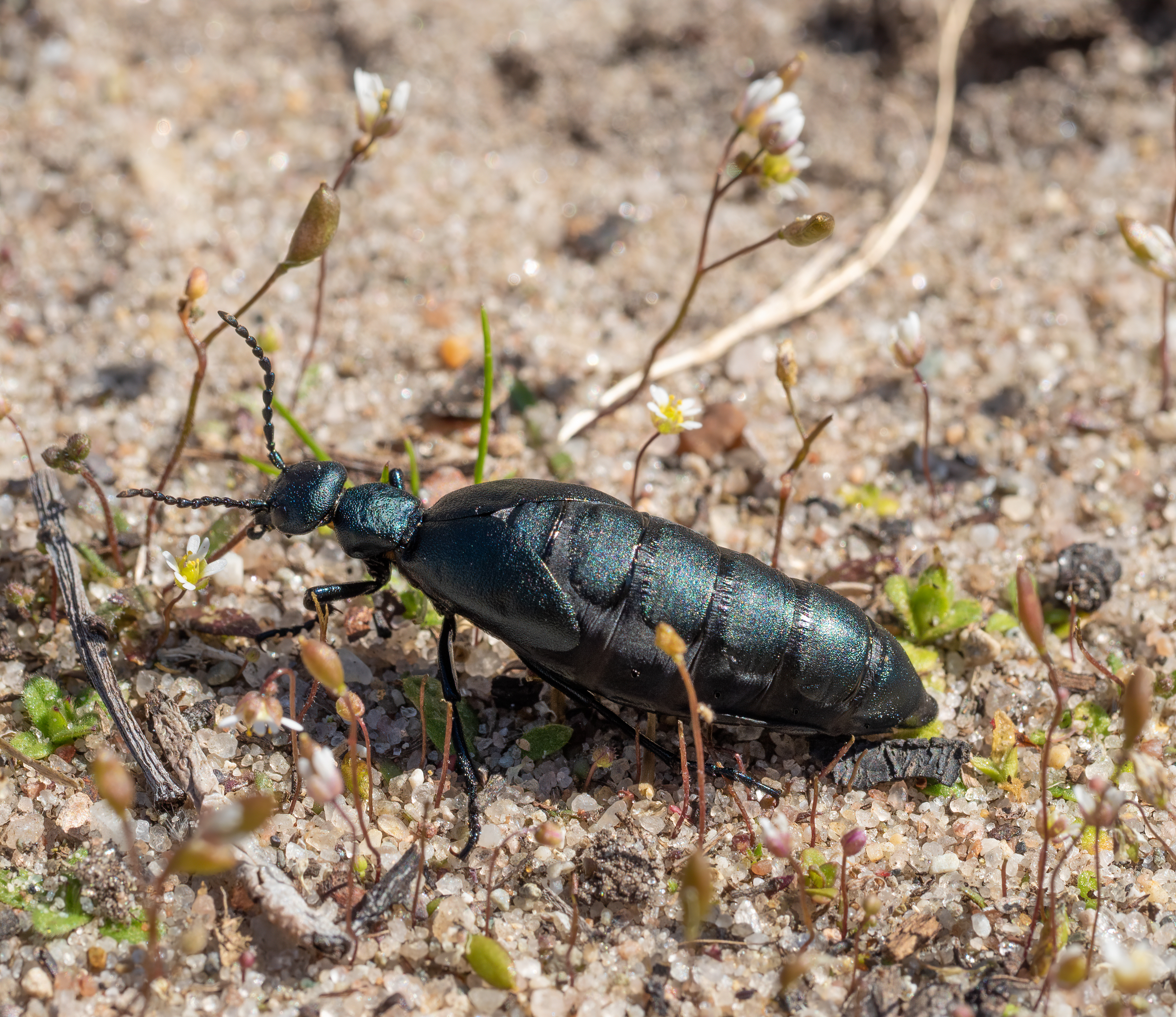
American Oil beetle in Floyd Bennett Field, NY

Meloe americanus is a type of blister beetle (Meloidae) found in North America. It is most relevant to the fields of agriculture and veterinary medicine. Adult beetles feed on different types of plants, which cause crop damage. They also release a fluid containing a chemical that is toxic, and at high concentrations lethal, to mammals. The first instar larvae are uniquely active and mobile, utilizing phoresy and parasitism to feed and mature through their developmental stages.

== Description ==
Meloe americanus, or the American oil beetle, is a type of blister beetle. It belongs to the genus Meloe, which is one of the larger genera in the Meloidae family, with 146 known species. They are called “oil beetles” because of a fluid they release from their joints when they feel threatened. Adult body length ranges from 7 mm to 17 mm [8]. M. americanus are entirely black, and sometimes they can be seen with a blue metallic hue. They are soft-bodied and long-legged, with their neck region skinnier than their head and abdomen. The elytra are short and abbreviated, while the hind wings are not present. Therefore, M. americanus are unable to fly as adults. Both females and males have similar appearances, with females being generally larger than males in size. There is, however, sexual dimorphism in their antennal structure: females have straight, linear antennae while males have a bend around the middle of their antennae.

== Geographic range ==
M. americanus is native to the northeastern regions of the United States, but they can also be found in central and southern regions of the United States. Out of all species of the Meloe genus, M. americanus is one of two that can be found in Mississippi, Louisiana, and Alabama. The presence of M. americanus in the south can be explained by the mild winters and the seasonal activity of flowering forbs that attract Apoidea. Usually, species of Meloe display a correlation between their pattern of geographic distribution and their seasonal activity as adults. M. americanus adults become active during the late autumn to early winter months, which explains why they can be found in places with milder climates.

== Habitat ==
M. americanus beetles prefer mesic habitats and temperate climates. These beetles can be found in lowland terrains, including farms, woodlands, and open grassy areas. Their habitat is influenced by their food preferences, so they will be found in areas where certain plants and insects are prevalent. Many of their favorite plants to feed on grow abundantly in the bottom of wooded ravines, so they are often encountered there. When they are not mating or foraging, they can be found hiding under objects, like leaves, logs, and rocks.

== Food resources ==
Adults and larvae of M. americanus have unique diets. Adults are phytophagous, meaning they only eat plants. They feed on the flowers, stems, and leaves of herbaceous plants. The most common families of plants that M. americanus feed on are Ranunculaceae and Compositae. Most of the plants that the adult beetles eat are relatively small, meaning that they feed at or near ground level, which makes them vulnerable to predators. Therefore, they do not spend a lot of time resting on their plants, like other blister beetles might do. M. americanus larvae are entomophagous, meaning they eat other insects. Their food sources consist of grasshopper eggs, bee eggs and larvae, and any provisions found in the nest of bees. Bee larval cells are provisioned with a viscous mixture of nectar and pollen, and the bee eggs are placed atop the provisions. They reach these cells via phoresy, or the act of latching themselves on to another insect for the purpose of dispersal.

== Parental care ==
=== Oviposition ===
Oviposition begins when the female creates a cavity in the soil to lay the eggs in. She does this by loosening the soil with her mandibles then digging with her legs until a hole that is slightly longer than her own body's length in depth is made. She will then climb out of the hole, turn around to back herself into the hole, and lay the eggs. The time it takes to complete this excavation process is not known for M. americanus, but in other species, it can range from forty minutes to two hours. The female remains in the cavity until oviposition is completed. Once again, the duration of oviposition for this species is not known, but for others, it can range from an hour to two hours. After all the eggs are laid, the female scrapes the soil back over the hole with her mandibles and packs the soil with her legs and abdomen. Filling the hole with soil takes about the same amount of time as digging the cavity. Females are capable of several ovipositions during their lifetime. During each oviposition, a female typically lays about 1000 eggs.

== Social behavior ==
=== Adult sociality ===
M. Americanus can be widely distributed among their geographic locations and are not often found in aggregations. This can be because of their inability to fly, limiting the areas that are available for them to meet. It could also be because of their plant preferences. The small size of Ranunculaceae and Compositae restricts how many beetles can gather on or around it. American oil beetles are generally tolerant of contact with conspecifics. They will either remain passive, depart, or kick at the other beetle in response to being touched.

=== Diel activity patterns ===
Unlike most Meloe adults, M. americanus beetles are nocturnal. During the day, they remain under objects on the ground. They are most active in dim light or darkness. When exposed to a bright light, they immediately take shelter under the nearest object. While most of their activity takes place during the night, some daytime activity can be observed if they are shielded from direct sunlight.

== Life cycle ==
There are four general life stages of a beetle: egg, larva, pupa, and adult. A Meloe egg can range from a yellow to deep orange color. They are cylindrical and about 0.5 to 2 mm long. Eggs can hatch within 30 days, but sometimes it can take up to 130 days or more for larvae to emerge after the eggs are laid. The remaining larval, pupal, and adult stages can be divided into nine instars in M. americanus.

The larvae are less than 1.6 mm in length, and light to dark brown in color. The larval stage is split into four stages, or seven instars. The first instar is called the triungulin phase because we see the emergence of triungulin larvae. The triungulin larvae are the most active out of all the larval stages. They climb foliage and wait for potential hosts to which they attach to, so that they can be transported to a host's nest, where further development occurs. The second through fifth instars make up the first grub phase. In this phase, larvae are still active, feeding and maturing inside the cells of bees. The next stage is the coarctate phase, or the sixth instar. Larvae in this phase become increasingly inactive and sedentary. The seventh instar is the second grub phase. These larvae are completely inactive.

The pupal stage is the eighth instar, and the adult stage is the ninth and final instar.

Temporal patterns of occurrence are dependent on temperature. Adult M. americanus beetles emerge from the soil between the winter and spring, with peak months being in December and April. During this time, they forage, mate, and oviposit. Triungulin larvae initially appear in the fall, are not seen during the winter months, and then reemerge in the spring, with their peak months being in October and April. The coarctate phase is entered in the spring and early summer and completed in the summer through early fall. Development inside the bee larval cells occurs in 60-90 days.

== Parasitism ==
M. americanus triungulin larvae have a phoretic relationship with wild bees and parasitize their larval cells. Bees and flies were discovered to have numerous larvae attached to the hairs on their hind legs. It was later determined that these larvae belonged to the Meloe species. The most commonly observed hosts belong to the Apoidea superfamily, but other insects in the Hymenoptera order have been observed to carry triungulin larvae, as well. Triungulin larvae usually attach to the base of the wings or on the legs. This is because these areas are the least accessible to the host, ensuring that the larvae won't be removed before reaching the nest.

Upon leaving their egg cavity, triungulin larvae will climb onto flowers and crawl around the petals continuously until they can attach to a host. It is hypothesized that the constant movement of a larva would increase the probability of encountering a visiting insect. It is not exactly known how larvae select the flowers they wait on, but it is suggested that the nectaries and pollen found on a flower play a role in attracting the larvae. It has been observed that M. americanus are almost always alone on flowers and on their host.

Upon reaching an appropriate host's nest, the triungulin larva will settle inside a cell containing a host egg and its provisions. From this point until it emerges as an adult, the larva is a parasite, living, feeding, and maturing inside the host cell. It sporadically feeds on the provisions, usually eating the nectar-pollen mixture first before eating the bee egg or larva. Meloe will utilize around two or more bee larvae and their provisions during its development.

== Mating ==
=== Courtship ===
All courtships are initiated by male M. americanus. To court the female, the male will climb onto her back, rub her abdomen with his legs, touch her antennae with his, and probe her abdomen with his protruded genitalia, located on the posterior tip of the abdomen. This pre-copulatory stage is referred to as the dorsal stage because the male sits dorsally atop the female. The dorsal stage can last anywhere between 15 seconds to 15 minutes, with the average time being 5 minutes.

During this stage, two main behaviors are observed: dorsal riding and display. Dorsal riding is when the male passively remains on top of the female with no other behaviors observed. Display is when the male actively stimulates the female by rubbing her abdomen or grasping and tapping her antennae.

Male antennae are suspected to play a critical role in initiating mating. When male beetles had their antennae removed by cutting them with scissors at the base, no attempts at copulation were made. Observing their behavior led to the hypothesis that male antennae contain hormone glands that are responsible for inducing sexual behavior. Even removing both middle legs on the male did not interfere with mating, although, the duration of the dorsal stage lasted longer due to mechanical difficulties with climbing and grasping the female.

=== Copulation ===
After a sufficient time courting the female, the male attempts genital insertion. These attempts are made regardless of the female's receptiveness. If the first insertion is unsuccessful, the male will usually spend more time in the dorsal stage before attempting another insertion. Antennal grasping is believed to be the most successful behavior to initiate copulation because it most commonly precedes genital insertion. A female can indicate her willingness to mate by elevating the apex of her abdomen and separating the eighth tergal and sternal plates, such as to facilitate entry into the vagina. Males will spend 5-50 minutes in the genital insertion phase before initiating the linear phase of copulation. It is called the linear phase because the male and female are oriented linearly, with the posterior tips of their abdomen connected. There are a few minutes of inactivity once the pair is in the linear stage, but then the female will proceed with normal activity, forcing the male to walk backwards. Copulation can last for up to eight hours.

=== Post-copulatory behavior ===
Post-copulatory mate guarding is not common in M. americanus as there are usually more females than males present in a population, so aggressive male competition is not expected. Both sexes may mate repeatedly. In some cases, both females and males find new mates only after a short amount of time since the termination of the previous copulation. In other instances, females may oviposit from their first copulation before mating with another male.

=== Homosexual courting behavior ===
Male M. americanus have been observed to display courtship behaviors towards other male beetles. Oftentimes, males that are confined together and sexually deprived or isolated will attempt to copulate with each other. The mechanism by which males were stimulated to behave this way are unknown. However, it can be implied that explicit recognition of females is not necessary for male sexual behavior to be triggered.

== Chemical defense mechanism ==
One of the main methods of defense that M. americanus utilizes is reflex bleeding. When blister beetles feel threatened or are disturbed, they secrete a dark orange fluid from their leg joints containing the chemical cantharidin. Larvae, by contrast, excrete a milky fluid from their mouth. Cantharidin is stored in the beetle's hemolymph and can make up 0.25-0.5% of the beetle's body weight. It is a very potent blistering agent that can cause a variety of health complications in all mammalian species. In high concentrations, it can be lethal. Despite its toxicity, cantharidin has a history of being used medicinally, for both humans and animals.

Cantharidin has been hypothesized to be involved in triggering sexual behavior in M. americanus, as well. There are cuticular pores located on male antennae, which provide evidence of a chemical secretion that influences courtship behavior. Furthermore, high concentrations of cantharidin have been found on male antennae and genitalia. In other species, it is known that cantharidin is part of the nuptial gift given from a male to a female during mating. However, the specific role and mechanism of cantharidin in M. americanus mating has not yet been identified.
