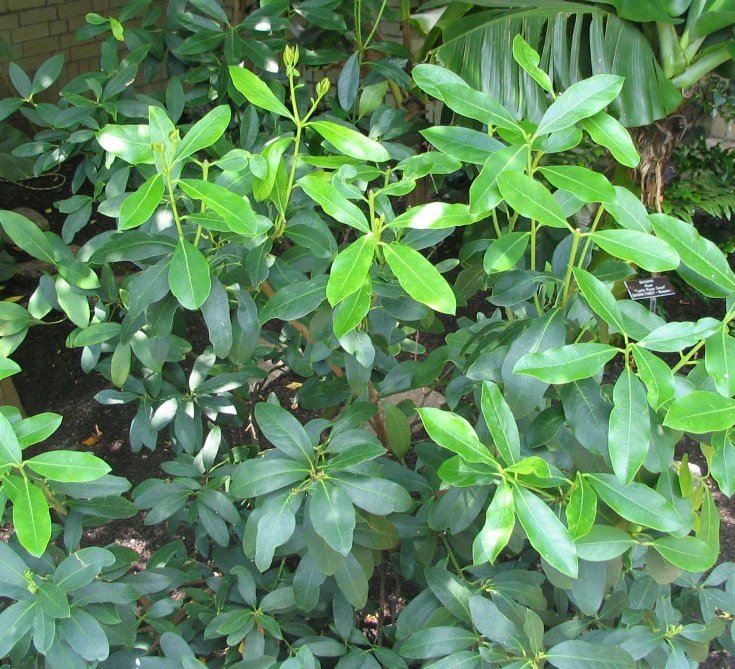
- Poison arrow plant, Acokanthera oblongifolia

Scientific classification
- Kingdom: Plantae
- Clade: Tracheophytes
- Clade: Angiosperms
- Clade: Eudicots
- Clade: Asterids
- Order: Gentianales
- Family: Apocynaceae
- Subfamily: Rauvolfioideae
- Tribe: Carisseae
- Genus: Acokanthera

Synonyms
- Toxicophlaea Harv.

= Acokanthera =

Genus of plants

Acokanthera is a genus of flowering plants in the family Apocynaceae. It comprises 5 species and is generally restricted to Africa, although A. schimperi also occurs in Yemen. Its sap contains the deadly toxin ouabain, a glycoside that causes heart failure. The sap is among the most commonly used in arrow poisons, including those used for poaching elephants.

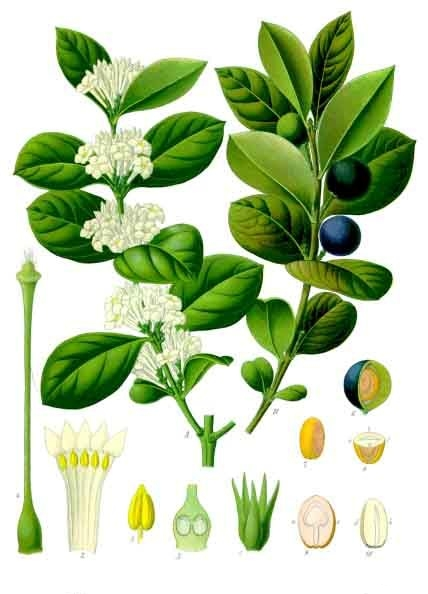
Acokanthera schimperi from Köhler's Medizinal Pflanzen 1897

The poison it contains works by stopping the heart, like most other arrow poisons.

Species

- Acokanthera laevigata Kupicha - Tanzania, Malawi
- Acokanthera oblongifolia (Hochst.) Benth. & Hook.f. ex B.D.Jacks. - Mozambique, South Africa
- Acokanthera oppositifolia (Lam.) Codd - widespread from Cape Province north to Zaire and Tanzania
- Acokanthera rotundata (Codd) Kupicha - Zimbabwe, Eswatini, eastern South Africa
- Acokanthera schimperi (A.DC.) Schweinf. - Yemen, Eritrea, Djibouti, Ethiopia, Somalia, Socotra, Kenya, Tanzania, Rwanda, Zaire
