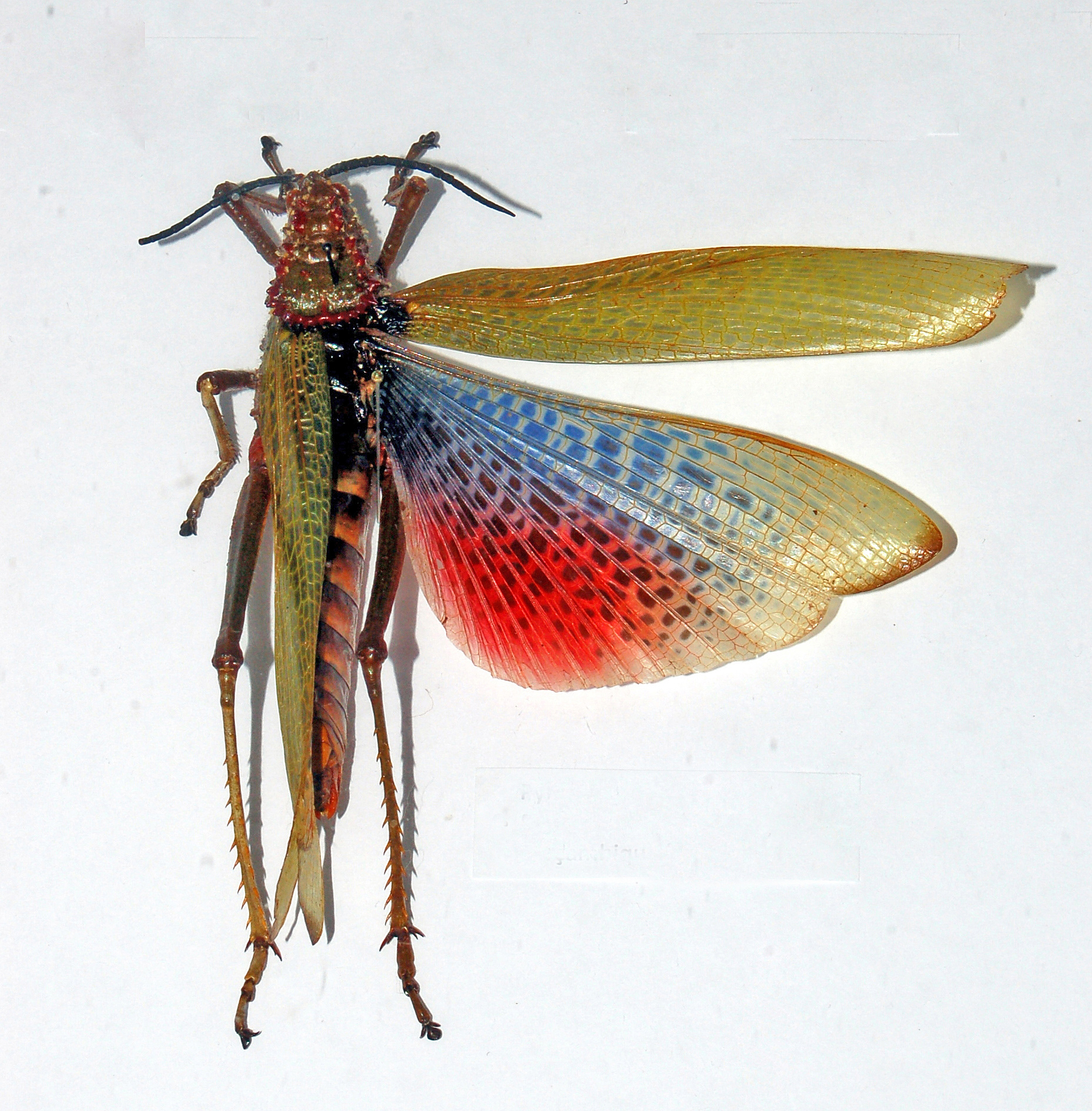
- Phymateus karschi from Mozambique. Mounted specimen

Scientific classification
- Domain: Eukaryota
- Kingdom: Animalia
- Phylum: Arthropoda
- Class: Insecta
- Order: Orthoptera
- Suborder: Caelifera
- Family: Pyrgomorphidae
- Genus: Phymateus
- Species: P. karschi

Binomial name
- Phymateus karschi Bolivar, 1904

= Phymateus karschi =

Species of grasshopper

Phymateus karschi is a locust in the family Pyrgomorphidae.

== Distribution ==
This species is present in Tropical Africa (mainly in Cameroon, Nigeria, Mozambique, Tanzania, Kenya, Malawi, Zaire and Eritrea). These locusts inhabit bushes and trees within Hyparrhenia grassland at submontane elevations between 900 and 1500 m on Mt Kilimanjaro.

== Description ==
Phymateus karschi can reach a body length of 40 millimetres (1.6 in) in males, of 52 millimetres (2.0 in) in females. These locusts have a green yellowish body. Pronotum shows red protuberances. Elytra are yellow with bluish and reddish areas. Femora are mainly yellowish, while tarsi are brown. The abdomen is dark brown and yellow.

== Bibliography ==
- Bolívar, I. 1904. Bol. R. Soc. Esp. Hist. Nat. 4:406, 411
- Johnston, H.B. 1956. Annotated catalogue of African grasshoppers 150
- Dirsh. 1964. Explor. Parc. natn. Garamba 44(3):49
- Dirsh. 1965. The African Genera of Acridoidea 117
- Johnston, H.B. 1968. Annotated catalogue of African grasshoppers Suppl:83
- Dirsh. 1970. Ann. Mus. Roy. Afr. Cent. 8(182):25
- Kevan, D.K.M. [Ed.]. 1977. In Beier [Ed.]. Orthopterorum Catalogus 16:252
- COPR (Centre for Overseas Pest Research). 1982. The Locust and Grasshopper Agricultural Manual 53
- Hemp, C. 2009. Jour. Orth. Res. 18(2):194
- Rowell, C. Hemp & Harvey. 2015. Jago's Grasshoppers of East and North East Africa, Vol. 1 113
