= Acokanthera laevigata =

Scientific classification
- Kingdom: Plantae
- Clade: Tracheophytes
- Clade: Angiosperms
- Clade: Eudicots
- Clade: Asterids
- Order: Gentianales
- Family: Apocynaceae
- Genus: Acokanthera
- Species: A. laevigata

Binomial name
- Acokanthera laevigata Kupicha

Species of plant

Acokanthera laevigata is a flowering plant, growing up to 12 metres (39 ft) tall. Its flowers are white and fragrant. The plant has been used as arrow poison. A. laevigata is native to Tanzania and Malawi.
