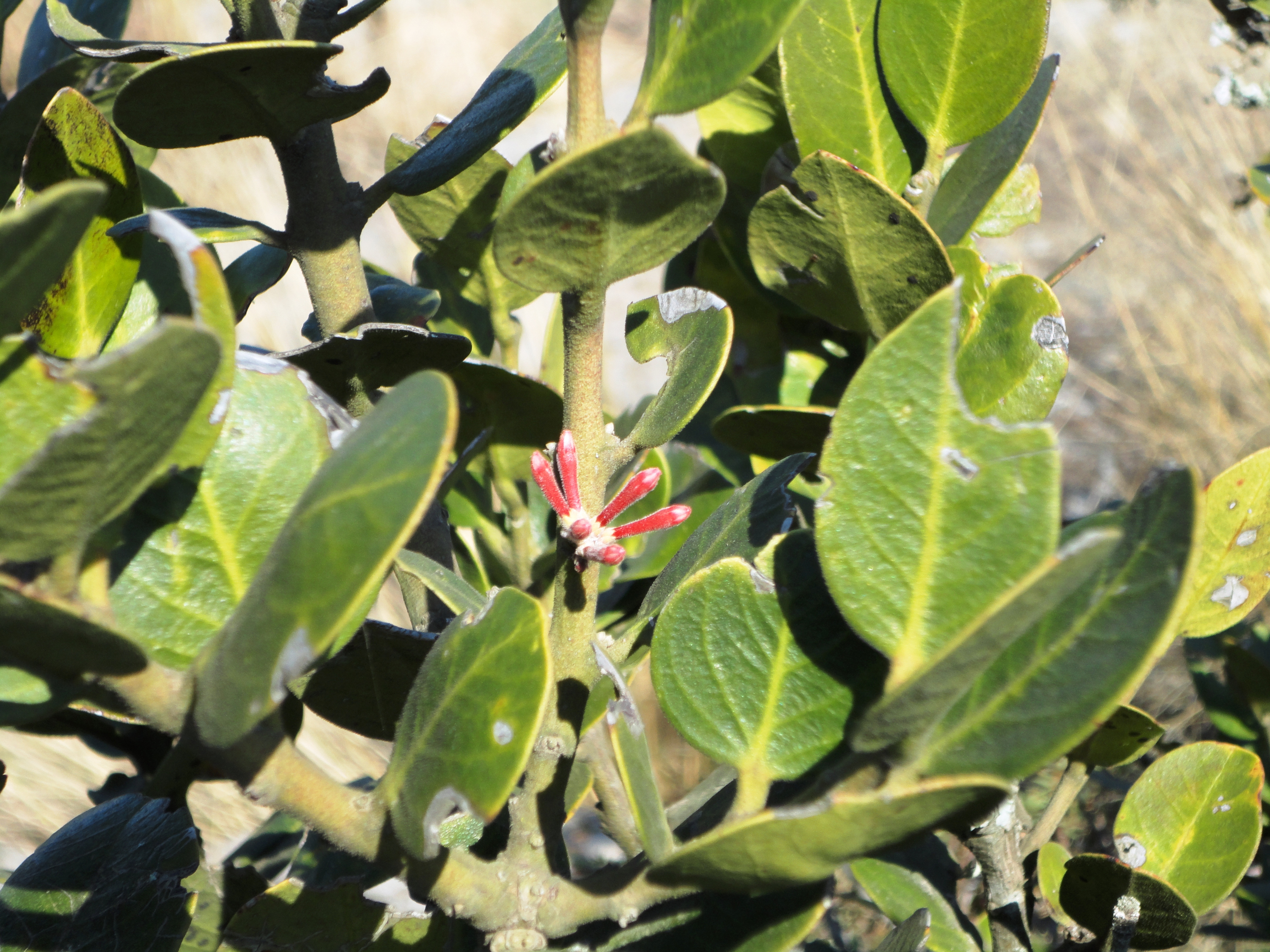

Conservation status
- Least Concern (IUCN 3.1)

Scientific classification
- Kingdom: Plantae
- Clade: Embryophytes
- Clade: Tracheophytes
- Clade: Spermatophytes
- Clade: Angiosperms
- Clade: Eudicots
- Clade: Asterids
- Order: Gentianales
- Family: Apocynaceae
- Genus: Acokanthera
- Species: A. rotundata

Binomial name
- Acokanthera rotundata (Codd) Kupicha

Synonyms
- Acokanthera schimperi var. rotundata Codd

= Acokanthera rotundata =

Round-leaved poison-bush

Species of plant

Acokanthera rotundata (commonly known as round-leaved poison-bush) is a plant in the family Apocynaceae. It grows as a shrub or small tree, with fragrant flowers featuring a white corolla, often pink to red on the corolla tube. The fruit is red to purple when ripe. Its habitat is in rocky areas of dry woodland. Acokanthera rotundata is native to Zimbabwe, Eswatini and South Africa.
