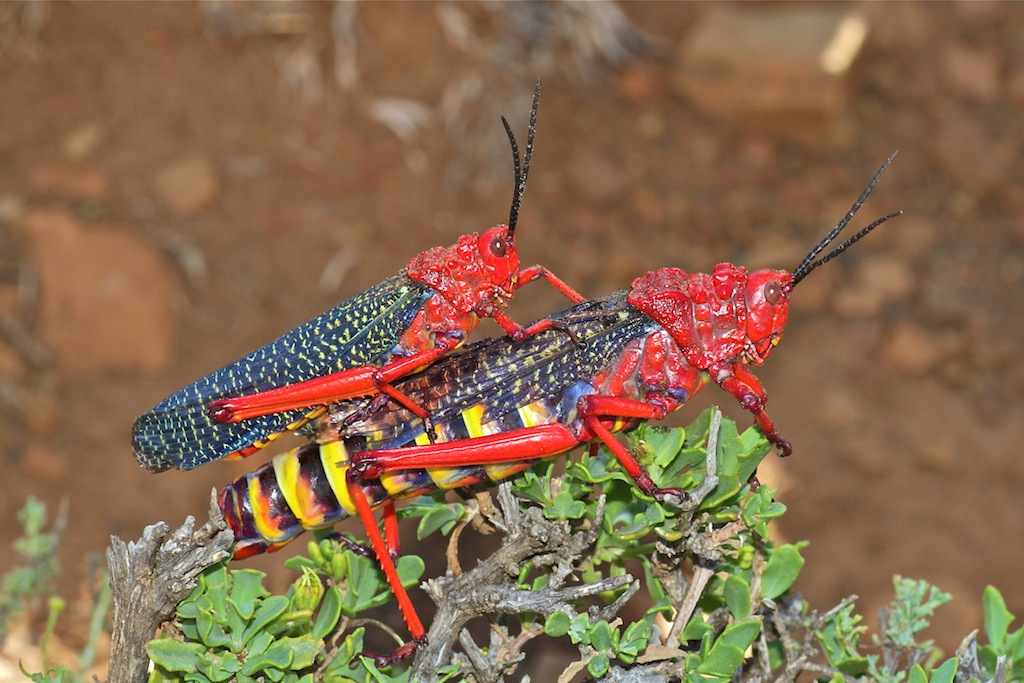
- Phymateus morbillosus, mating pair
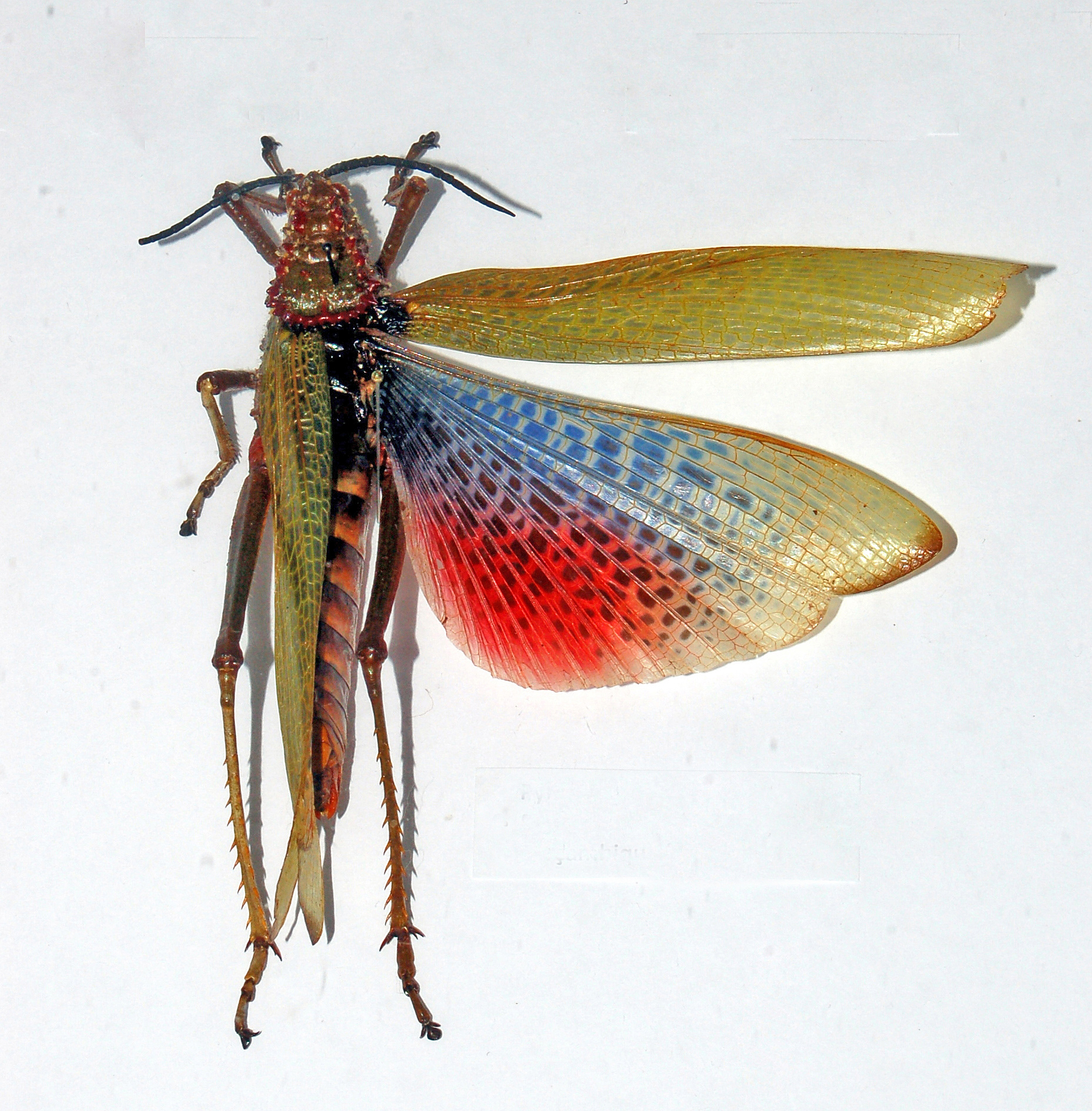
- Phymateus karschi from Mozambique

Scientific classification
- Domain: Eukaryota
- Kingdom: Animalia
- Phylum: Arthropoda
- Class: Insecta
- Order: Orthoptera
- Suborder: Caelifera
- Family: Pyrgomorphidae
- Subfamily: Pyrgomorphinae
- Tribe: Phymateini
- Genus: Phymateus; Thunberg 1815

= Phymateus =

Genus of grasshoppers

Phymateus is a genus of fairly large grasshoppers of the family Pyrgomorphidae, native to shrubland, semi-deserts, savanna, woodland, gardens and cultivated areas in Sub-Saharan Africa, with ten species in the African mainland and two species in Madagascar. Some species have bright aposematic colours and are highly toxic.

== Description ==
Phymateus are African grasshoppers that typically are about 4–8.5 cm (1.6–3.3 in) long as adults, with females generally being larger than males of the same species. Some species at maturity are capable of long migratory flights. They raise and rustle wings when disturbed and may secrete a noxious fluid from the thoracic joint. Their toxins, which are accumulated from the toxic plants they feed on, can be very strong and there have been reported deaths in birds and mammals, including humans, after eating Phymateus grasshoppers. While they do show a preference for feeding on certain toxic plants, notably Asclepias milkweeds, they will feed on a wide range of plants, and are sometimes regarded as pests because of the damage they may cause to agricultural crops. They may congregate in large numbers on trees and shrubs, in some species arranged in such a way as to resemble foliage. Other species have bright aposematic warning colours. Although adults of both sexes are fully winged, in at least P. morbillosus the females, which are longer and considerably heavier than males, are unable to fly.

== List of species ==
The Orthoptera Species File lists:

subgenus Maphyteus Bolívar, 1904

1. Phymateus baccatus Stål, 1876
2. Phymateus leprosus (Fabricius, 1793)

subgenus Phymateus Thunberg, 1815

1. Phymateus aegrotus (Gerstaecker, 1869)
2. Phymateus bolivari Kirby, 1910
3. Phymateus cinctus (Fabricius, 1793)
  synonyms: P. stolli (Saussure, 1861) = P. flavus (I. Bolivar, 1903) = P. squarrosus (Houttuyn, 1813)
4. Phymateus iris Bolívar, 1882
5. Phymateus karschi Bolívar, 1904
6. Phymateus madagassus Karsch, 1888
7. Phymateus morbillosus (Linnaeus, 1758) = type species (as Gryllus morbillosus L.)
8. Phymateus pulcherrimus (I. Bolívar, 1904)
9. Phymateus saxosus (Coquerel, 1862)
10. Phymateus viridipes Stål, 1873

== Gallery ==
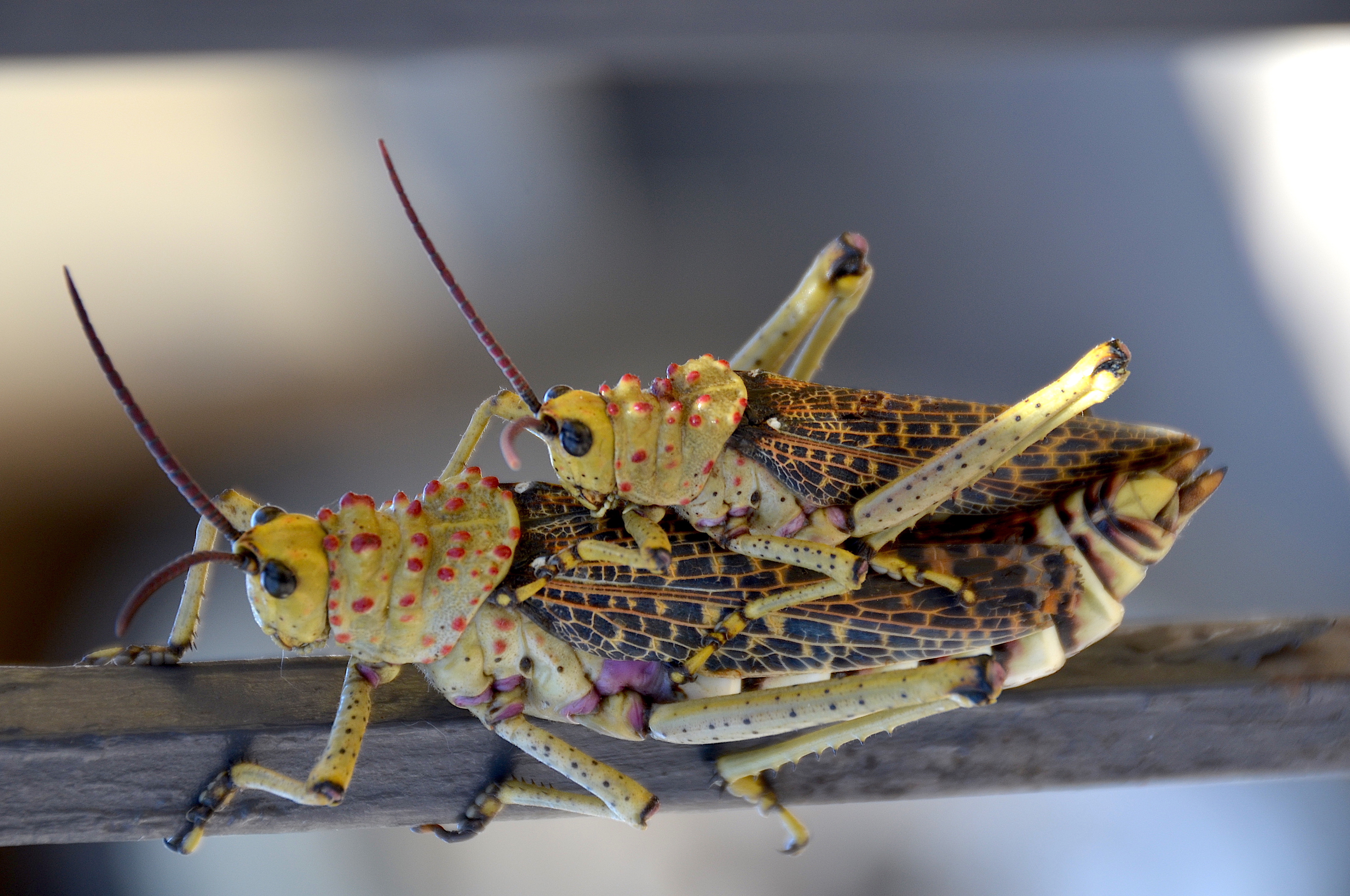
Phymateus baccatus, mating pair

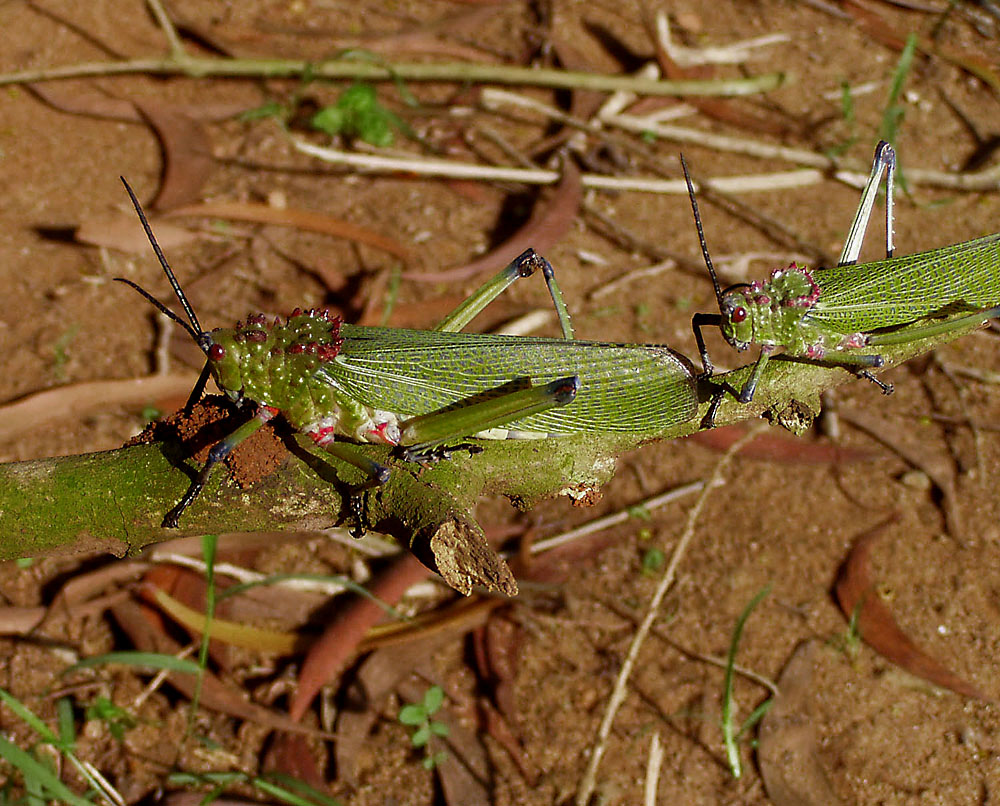
Phymateus cinctus

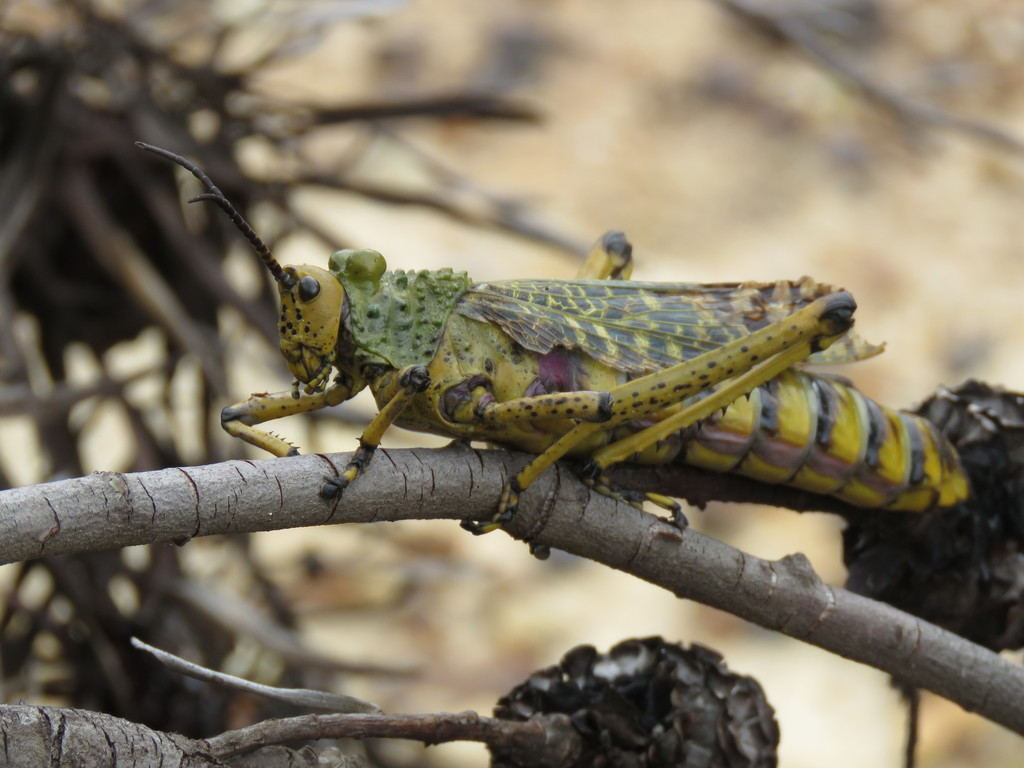
Phymateus leprosus

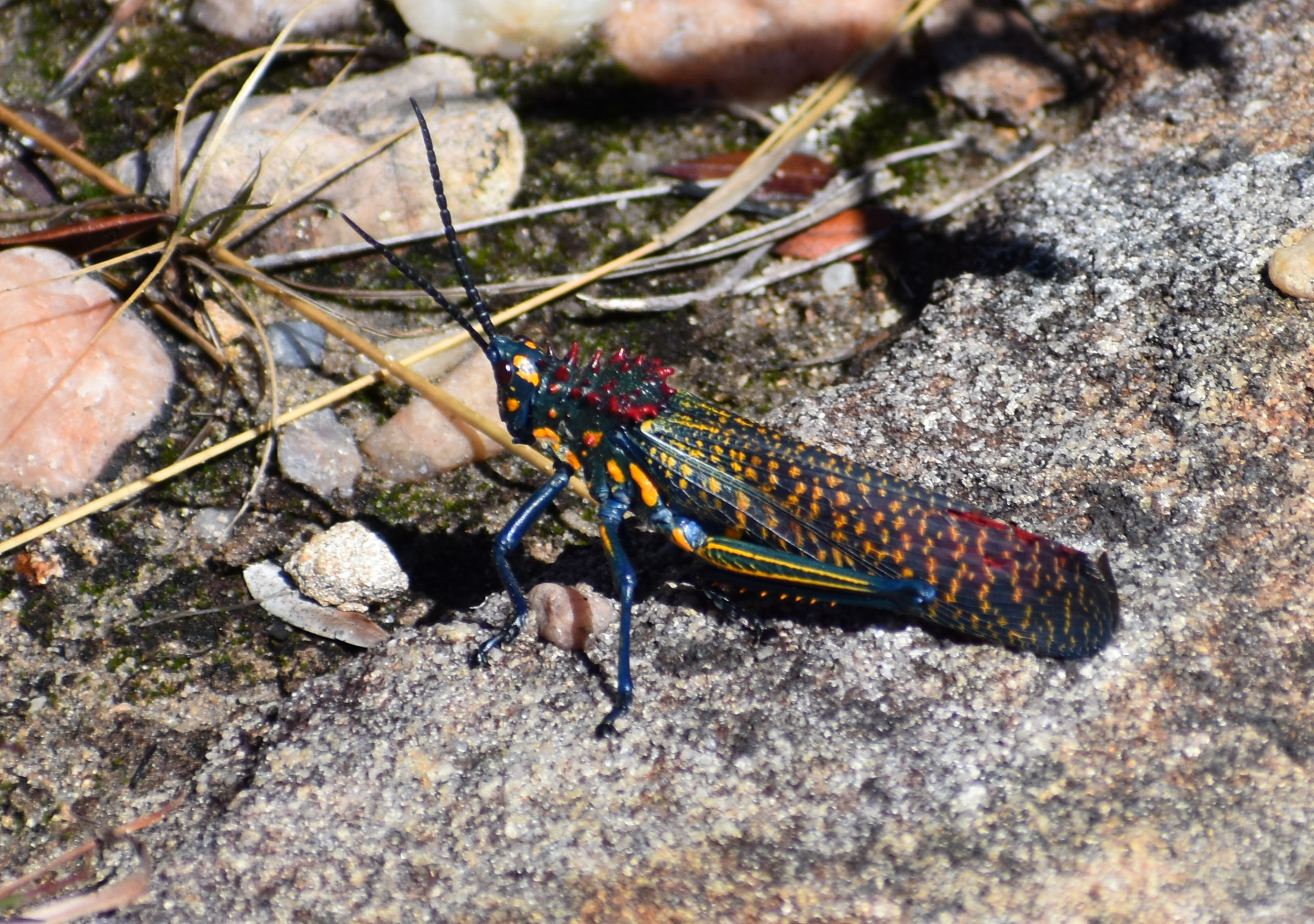
Phymateus saxosus (shown) and P. madagassus are from Madagascar; the remaining species are from the African mainland

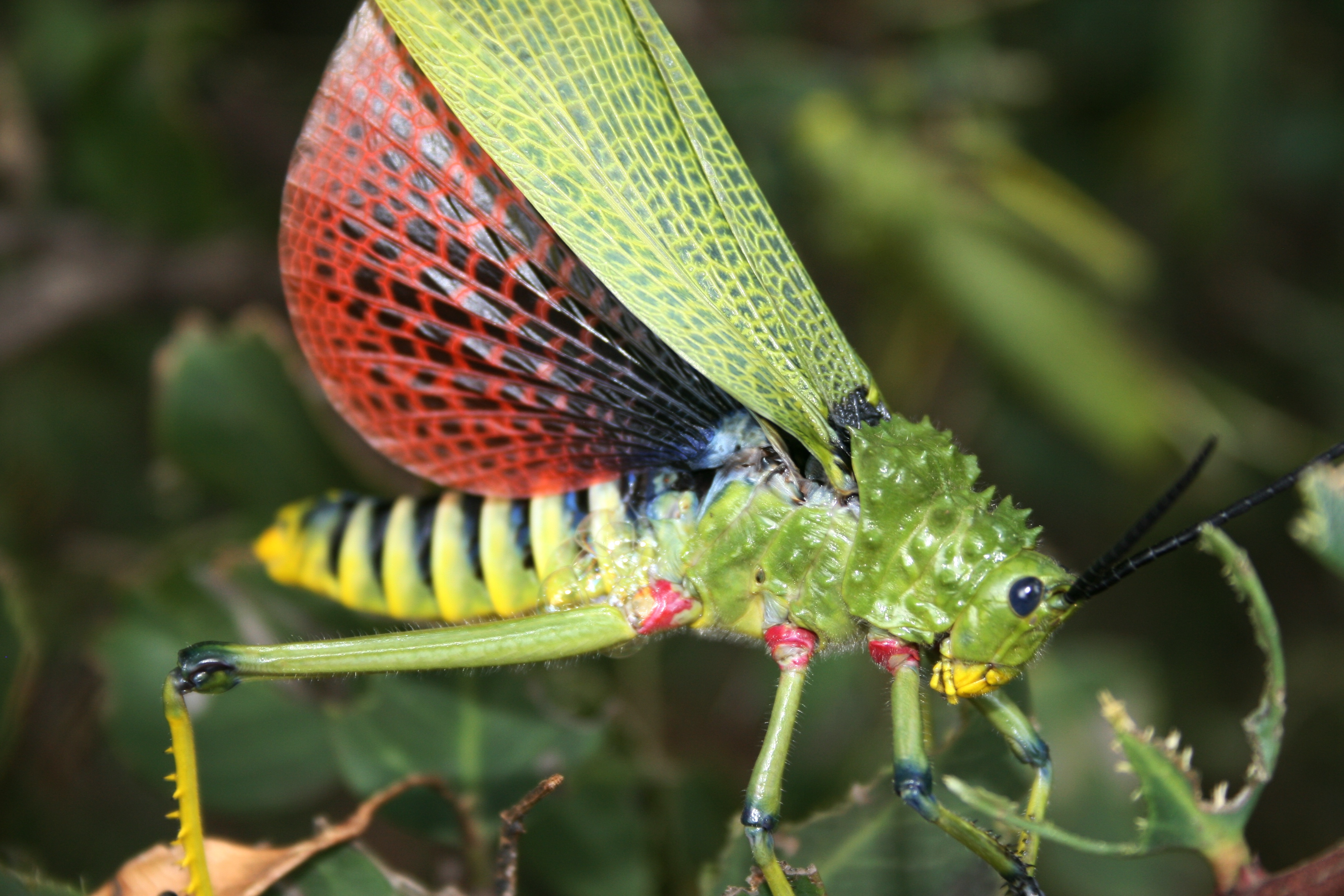
Phymateus viridipes showing the bright wings typical of several species in the genus
