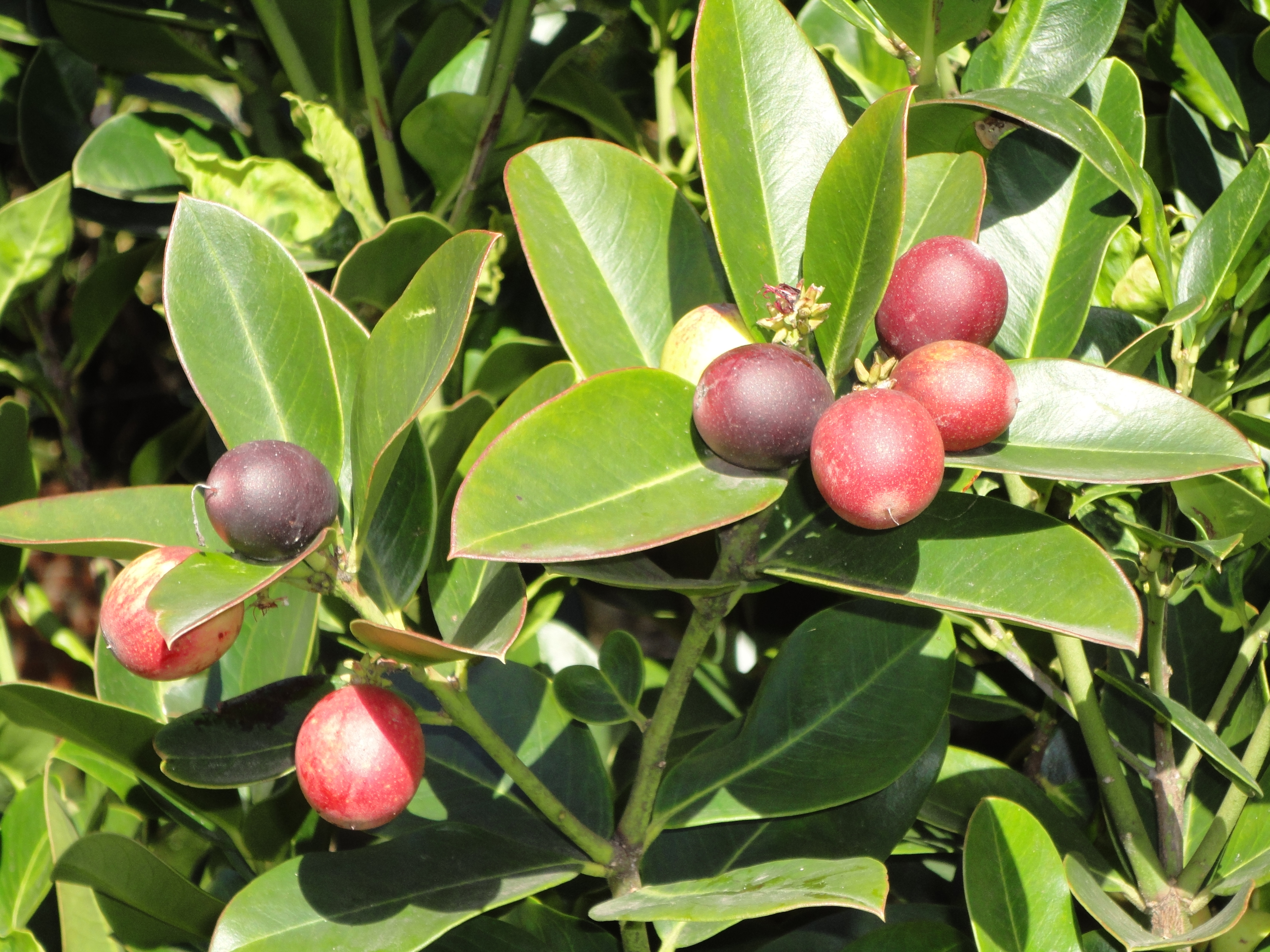

Scientific classification
- Kingdom: Plantae
- Clade: Tracheophytes
- Clade: Angiosperms
- Clade: Eudicots
- Clade: Asterids
- Order: Gentianales
- Family: Apocynaceae
- Genus: Acokanthera
- Species: A. oppositifolia

Binomial name
- Acokanthera oppositifolia (Lam.) Codd

Synonyms
- Cestrum oppositifolium Lam. 1792; Toxicophlaea thunbergii Harv.; Acokanthera venenata (Burm.f.) G.Don; Acokanthera lamarckii G.Don; Carissa oppositifolia (Lam.) Pichon; Cestrum venenatum Burm.f.; Acokanthera venenata (Burm.f.) G.Don; Toxicophlaea thunbergii Harv.; Toxicophlaea cestroides A.DC.; Pleiocarpa hockii De Wild.; Acokanthera longiflora Stapf; Carissa acokanthera Pichon; Acokanthera rhodesica Merxm.; Carissa longiflora (Stapf) G.H.M.Lawr.

= Acokanthera oppositifolia =

Species of plant

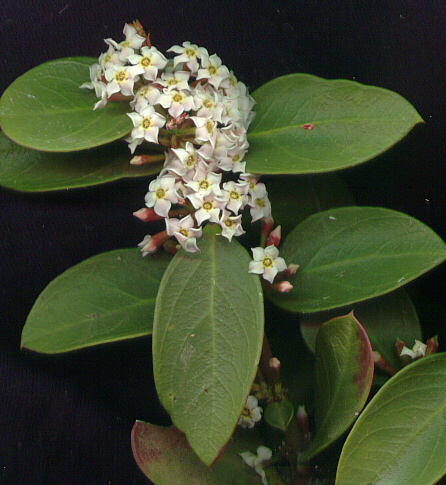

Acokanthera oppositifolia, the poison arrow tree, is a shrub used as the source of an arrow poison and to coat caltrops made from the sharp fruits of the puncture vine (Tribulus terrestris). All plants of the genus Acokanthera contain toxic cardiac glycosides strong enough to cause death. Acokanthera oppositifolia is widespread in southern and central Africa from Cape Province north to The Democratic Republic of the Congo and Tanzania.

Acokanthera schimperi is employed for the same purpose.

Unlike all other parts of the plant, the ripe fruit is sweet and edible. Unripe fruit are still poisonous, so only really ripe fruit are eaten.
