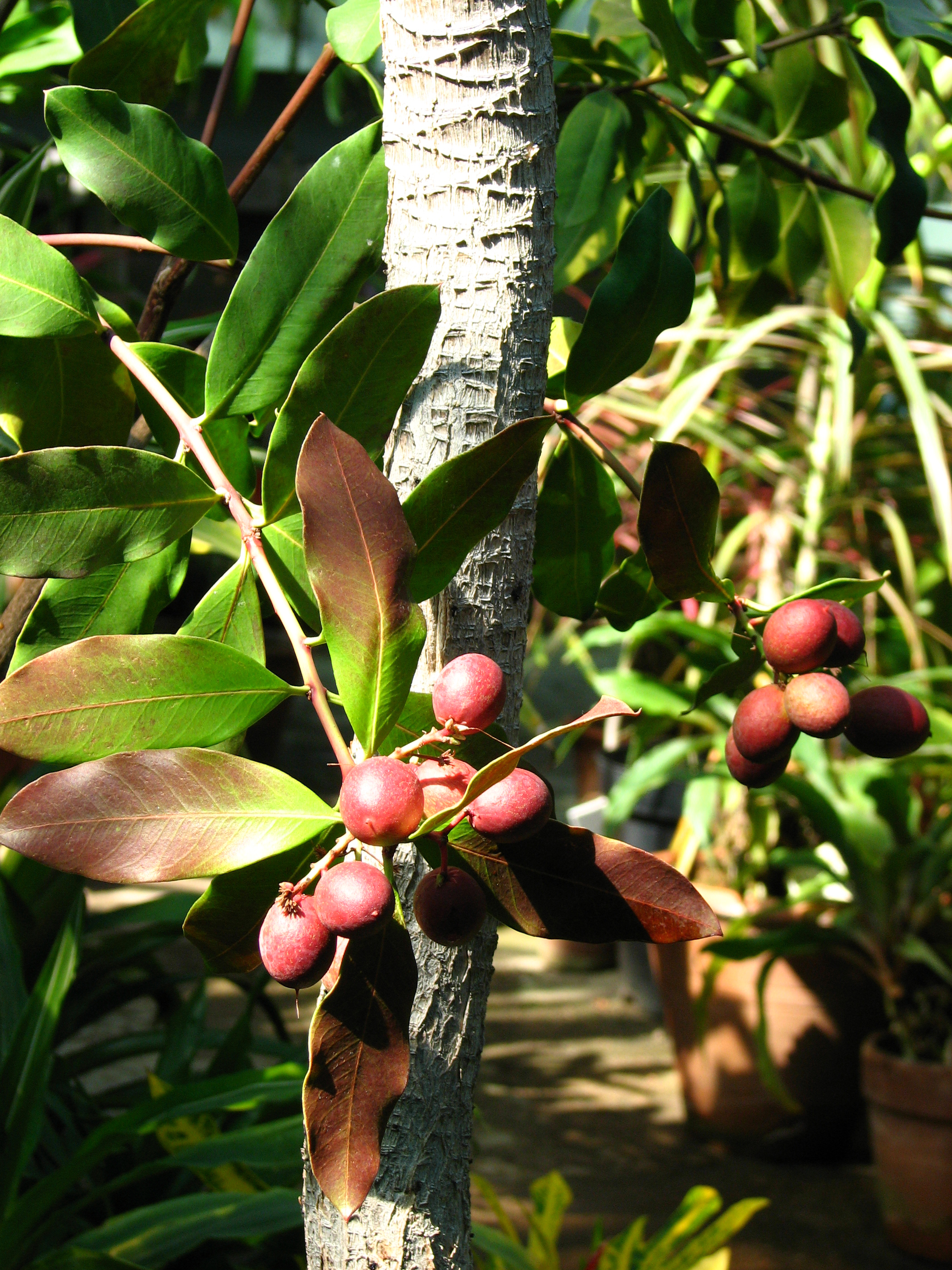

Conservation status
- Least Concern (IUCN 3.1)

Scientific classification
- Kingdom: Plantae
- Clade: Tracheophytes
- Clade: Angiosperms
- Clade: Eudicots
- Clade: Asterids
- Order: Gentianales
- Family: Apocynaceae
- Genus: Acokanthera
- Species: A. oblongifolia

Binomial name
- Acokanthera oblongifolia (Hochst.) Benth. & Hook.f. ex B.D.Jacks.

Synonyms
- Acokanthera spectabilis (Sond.) Hook.f.; Carissa oblongifolia Hochst.; Carissa spectabilis (Sond.) Pichon; Jasminonerium oblongifolium (Hochst.) Kuntze; Toxicophlaea spectabilis Sond.

= Acokanthera oblongifolia =

Species of plant

Acokanthera oblongifolia (commonly known as African wintersweet, dune poison bush, Hottentot's poison, poison arrow plant or wintersweet) is a plant in the family Apocynaceae. It grows as an evergreen shrub or small tree up to 6 metres (20 ft) tall. Its fragrant flowers feature a white tinged pink corolla. The berries are purple when ripe. Its habitat is dry forest and coastal thickets. Acokanthera oblongifolia is used in local African medicinal treatments for snakebites, itches and internal worms. The plant has been used as arrow poison. The species is native to Mozambique and South Africa.

== Taxonomy ==
It was first described in 1844 by Christian Ferdinand Friedrich Hochstetter as Carissa oblongifolia, reassigned in 1876 to the genus, Acokanthera, by George Bentham and Joseph Hooker, but not validly, and finally, in 1895, validly published by Benjamin Daydon Jackson as Acokanthera oblongifolia.
