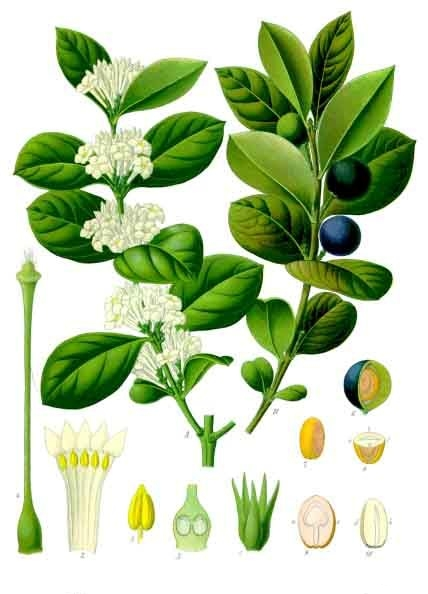
- Acokanthera schimperi

Scientific classification
- Kingdom: Plantae
- Clade: Embryophytes
- Clade: Tracheophytes
- Clade: Angiosperms
- Clade: Eudicots
- Clade: Asterids
- Order: Gentianales
- Family: Apocynaceae
- Genus: Acokanthera
- Species: A. schimperi

Binomial name
- Acokanthera schimperi (A.DC.) Schweinf.

Synonyms
- Acokanthera abyssinica K.Schum. nom. illeg.; Acokanthera deflersii Schweinf. ex Lewin; Acokanthera friesiorum Markgr.; Acokanthera ouabaio Cathelineau ex Lewin; Acokanthera schimperi (A. DC.) Benth. & Hook. f.; Arduina schimperi (A. DC.) Baill.; Carissa deflersii (Schweinf. ex Lewin) Pichon; Carissa friesiorum (Markgr.) Cufod.; Carissa inepta Perrot & Vogt; Carissa schimperi A.DC.

= Acokanthera schimperi =

Species of plant

Acokanthera schimperi, arrow poison tree, belonging to the family Apocynaceae, is a small tree native to eastern and central Africa as well as to Yemen.

== Uses ==
The bark, wood and roots of Acokanthera schimperi are used as an important ingredient of arrow poison in Africa. All plant parts contain acovenoside A and ouabaïne, which are cardiotonic glycosides. Its fruit is edible, and is eaten as a famine food. When ripe they are sweet but also slightly bitter. Unripe fruits have caused accidental poisoning as they are highly toxic.

The maned rat spreads the plant's poison on its fur and becomes poisonous.

It is also used in traditional African medicine. In Ethiopia, for example, Acokanthera schimperi leaves have been traditionally used for jaundice.

== Geographic distribution ==
Acokanthera schimperi is native to Eritrea, Ethiopia, Somalia, Kenya, Uganda, Tanzania, Rwanda and DR Congo. It is the only species in the genus that also occurs outside Africa, in southern Yemen.
