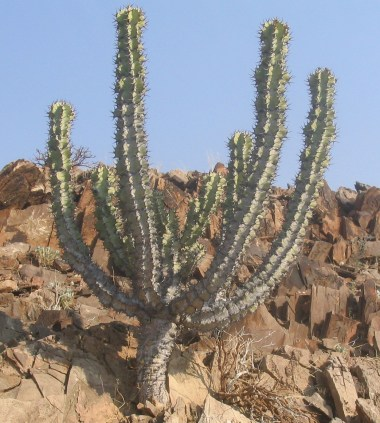

Scientific classification
- Kingdom: Plantae
- Clade: Tracheophytes
- Clade: Angiosperms
- Clade: Eudicots
- Clade: Rosids
- Order: Malpighiales
- Family: Euphorbiaceae
- Genus: Euphorbia
- Species: E. virosa

Binomial name
- Euphorbia virosa Willd.

= Euphorbia virosa =

Species of plant

Euphorbia virosa, the Gifboom or poison tree, is a plant of the spurge family Euphorbiaceae. It has a short main stem, usually twisted, from which 5–10 cm branches emerge. These leafless branches have 5 to 8 edges. Paired thorns grow in regularly spaced intervals from the edges.

Euphorbia virosa is commonly distributed from the Orange River in South Africa to Southern Angola, and occurs throughout the Namib Desert, mainly on rocky slopes. The plant contains within the branches a milky and creamy substance with carcinogenic properties. This substance is very poisonous and is used by San (Bushmen) to dip the tips of their hunting arrows. Contact with it causes skin irritation, and if the eyes are afflicted, blindness may occur.

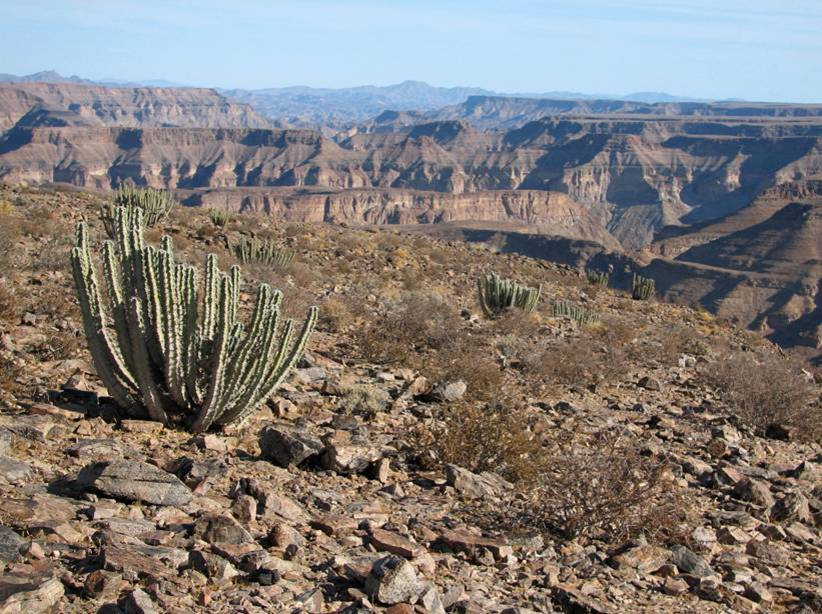
Gifboom in a natural setting at the Fish River Canyon
