= Autohaemorrhaging =

Action of animals deliberately ejecting blood from their bodies

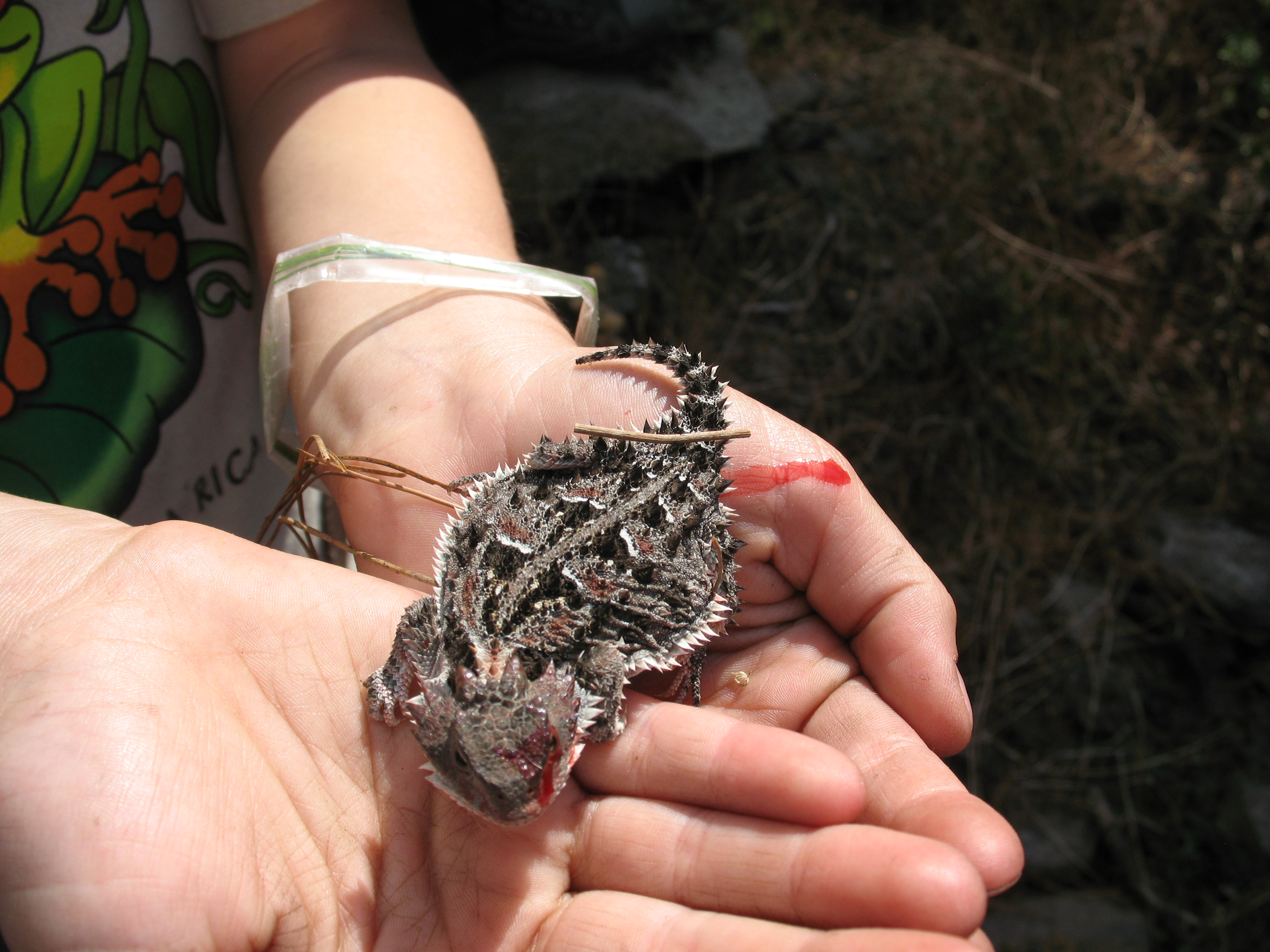
Horned lizard showing evidence of autohaemorrhaging

Autohaemorrhaging, or reflex bleeding, is the action of animals deliberately ejecting blood from their bodies. Autohaemorrhaging has been observed as occurring in two variations. In the first form, blood is squirted toward a predator. The blood of these animals usually contains toxic compounds, making the behaviour an effective chemical defense mechanism. In the second form, blood is not squirted, but is slowly emitted from the animal's body. This form appears to serve a deterrent effect, and is used by animals whose blood does not seem to be toxic. Most animals that autohaemorrhage are insects, but some reptiles also display this behaviour.

Some organisms have shown an ability to tailor their autohaemorrhaging response. Armoured crickets will projectile autohaemorrhage over longer distances when attacked from the side, compared to being attacked by a predator overhead.

== Insects ==
Several orders of insects have been observed to utilize this defence mechanism.

- Beetles:
  - Meloidae (blister beetles) – their haemolymph contains cantharidin that they sequester from plants on which they feed. One of the known species is Meloe americanus.
  - Tenebrionidae (darkling beetles) – larvae of Asbolus verrucosus have been observed to autohaemorrhage while they feign death.
  - Chrysomelidae, incl. Timarcha species – their haemolymph contains anthraquinones.
  - Coccinellidae (ladybirds, ladybugs, lady beetles) – An alkaloid toxin in the haemolymph is exuded through the joints of the exoskeleton, triggered by mechanical stimulation (such as predator attack).
- Hemiptera:
  - Cercopidae – including spittlebugs Prosapia bicincta and Prosapia ignipectus
- Lepidoptera:
  - Tiger moth adults, such as Arctia caja, which mixes haemolymph with glandular products (neurotoxic choline esters).
- Orthoptera:
  - Bushhoppers, such as Dictyophorus spumans, Phymateus viridipes, and Phymateus leprosus – their haemolymph contains cardiac glycosides, sequestered from milkweed on which they feed.
  - Tettigoniidae (katydids and bush crickets), including Eugaster species and Acanthoplus discoidalis (armoured katydid, armoured bush cricket)
- Plecoptera:
  - Stonefly larvae

== Reptiles ==
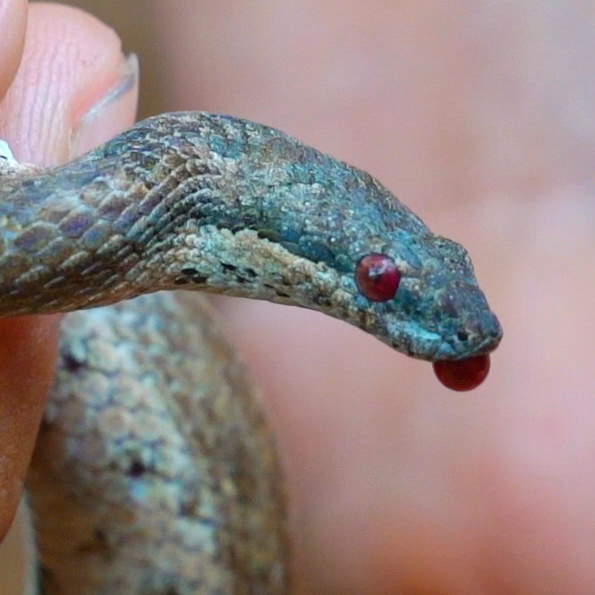
A West Indian wood snake displaying autohaemorrhaging. The eyes are fully flooded with blood and some is emerging from the mouth.

=== Lizards ===
- Horned lizards (Phrynosomatidae). At least six species of horned lizards are able to squirt an aimed stream of blood from the corners of their eyes, up to 5 feet (1.5 m).

=== Snakes ===
- West Indian wood snake (Tropidophis). Thirteen species have been found to expel blood from the mouth and nostrils while also fully flooding both eyes with blood.
- European grass snake (Natrix natrix), which secretes blood from the lining of the mouth while playing dead.
- Long-nosed snake (Rhinocheilus lecontei), which exudes blood from the cloaca.
- Eastern hognose snake (Heterodon platirhinos), which emits blood from the cloacal region.
- Plain-bellied water snake (Nerodia erythrogaster), which releases blood from the mouth.
- Western hognose snake (Heterodon nasicus), which releases blood from the mouth.

== Consequences of reflexive bleeding ==
In some cases, the loss of blood can be substantial. Beetles may lose up to 13% of their net body weight as a consequence of expelling haemolymph. Autohaemorrhaging may result in dehydration. The ejection of blood puts organisms at risk of cannibalism from other members of their species.

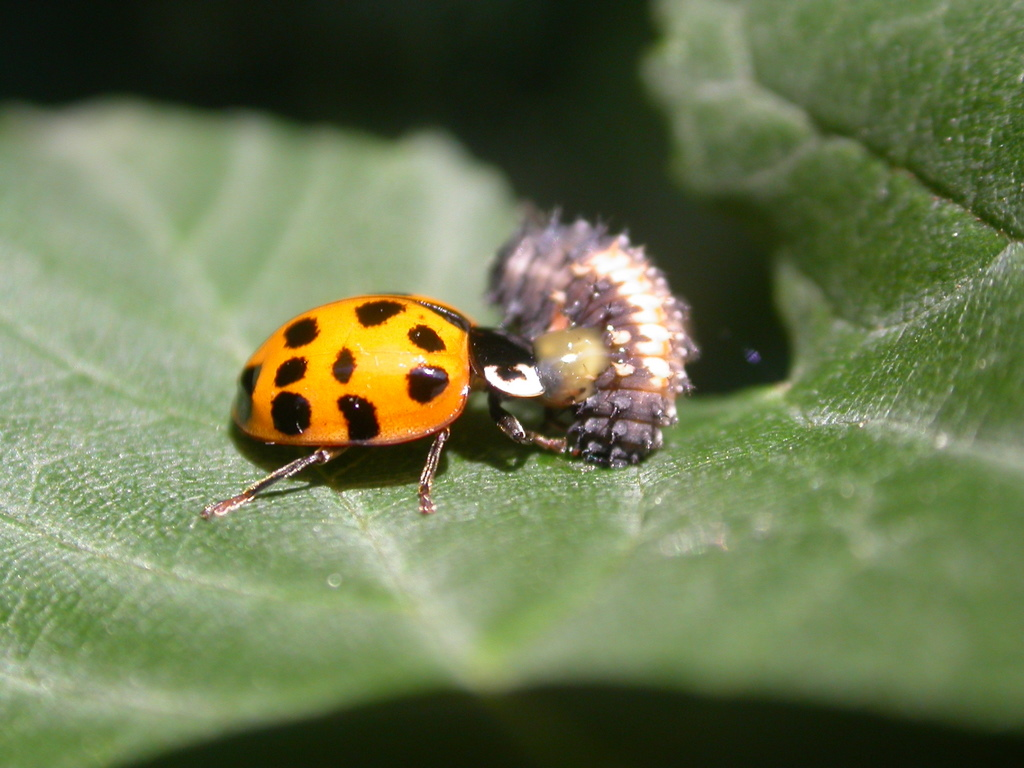
An inactive prepupa Asian ladybeetle autohaemorrhaging, resulting from cannibalism by an adult of the same species.

== See also ==
- Autothysis
- Bleeding (Haemorrhage)
