= Rostafuroxin =

Names
- IUPAC name 21,23-Epoxy-24-nor-5β-chola-20,22-diene-3β,14β,17-triol
- Systematic IUPAC name (1S,3aS,3bR,5aR,7S,9aS,9bS,11aS)-1-(Furan-3-yl)-9a,11a-dimethylhexadecahydro-3aH-cyclopenta[a]phenanthrene-1,3a,7-triol

Identifiers
CAS Number	156722-18-8
3D model (JSmol)	Interactive image
ChEMBL	ChEMBL2068971
ChemSpider	135709
DrugBank	DB12350
PubChem CID	153976
UNII	P848LCX62B
CompTox Dashboard (EPA)	DTXSID20870040
- InChI: InChI=1S/C23H34O4/c1-20-8-5-17(24)13-15(20)3-4-19-18(20)6-9-21(2)22(25,10-11-23(19,21)26)16-7-12-27-14-16/h7,12,14-15,17-19,24-26H,3-6,8-11,13H2,1-2H3/t15-,17+,18+,19-,20+,21-,22+,23+/m1/s1 Key: AEAPORIZZWBIEX-DTBDINHYSA-N
- SMILES: C[C@]12CC[C@@H](C[C@H]1CC[C@@H]3[C@@H]2CC[C@]4([C@@]3(CC[C@@]4(C5=COC=C5)O)O)C)O

Properties
Chemical formula	C_{23}H_{34}O_{4}
Molar mass	374.521 g·mol^{−1}
- Except where otherwise noted, data are given for materials in their standard state (at 25 °C [77 °F], 100 kPa). Infobox references

Rostafuroxin is a digitoxigenin analog that has been shown to lower blood pressure in an animal model of hypertension. It modulates the effects of the enzyme Na^{+}/K^{+}-ATPase, which maintains sodium and potassium ion gradients across plasma membranes. Rostafuroxin is being studied in clinical trials for the treatment of essential hypertension.
