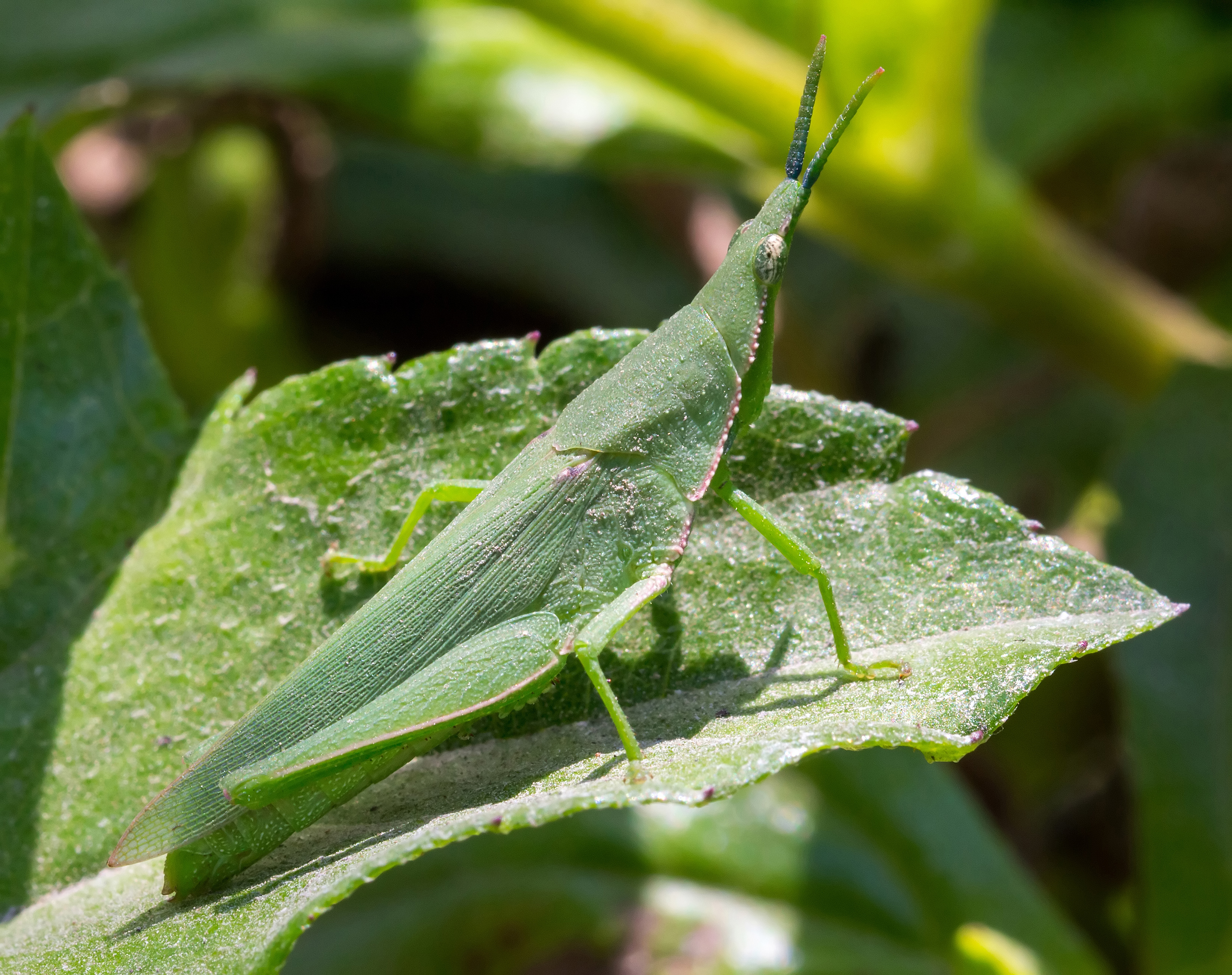

Scientific classification
- Kingdom: Animalia
- Phylum: Arthropoda
- Class: Insecta
- Order: Orthoptera
- Suborder: Caelifera
- Family: Pyrgomorphidae
- Genus: Atractomorpha
- Species: A. crenulata

Binomial name
- Atractomorpha crenulata Fabricius, 1793

= Atractomorpha crenulata =

Species of grasshopper

Atractomorpha crenulata, commonly known as the tobacco grasshopper, is a species of grasshopper in the subfamily Pyrgomorphinae, found in Asia.

== Taxonomy ==
A. crenulata is a member of the genus Atractomorpha, which is part of family Pyrgomorphidae. Johan Christian Fabricius, in his 1793 book Supplementum Entomologiae Systematicae, recorded the species as Truxalis crenulatus; it was later designated A. crenulata crenulata by William Forsell Kirby in 1910. As such, A. crenulata is the type species of its genus, which was described by Henri Louis Frédéric de Saussure in 1862.

Three subspecies of A. crenulata are known.

- A. c. crenulata (Fabricius, 1793)
  - Synonyms: A. c. consobrina, A. c. obscura, A. c. porrecta, A. c. scaber
- A. c. fumosa (Bolívar, 1905)
- A. c. prasina (Bolívar, 1905)

== Description ==
A. crenulata is greenish in color, with well-developed tegmina and rosy wings. The grasshoppers' bodies are medium-sized, whereas their antennae are short.

== Range and habitat ==
A. crenulata is distributed in Sri Lanka, Bangladesh, India, Myanmar, north-western Sumatra, and southern Vietnam. But can also be found in midwestern areas of North America, such as Nebraska, Kansas and others Keith McE. Kevan argues that specimens of A. similis reported in the Lesser Sunda Islands are most likely specimens of A. crenulata.

== Works cited ==
- Kevan, Keith McE. (May 1971). "The synonymy and distribution of the crenaticeps-group of Atractomorpha Saussure, 1862 (Orthoptera, Acridoidea, Pyrgomorphidae)". Zoological Journal of the Linnean Society. 50 (2): 143–159. doi:10.1111/j.1096-3642.1971.tb00756.x.
- Hazra, A.K.; Dey, A.; Hazra, N. (1997). "Studies on the Ecology and Taxonomy of Grasshopper (Acridoidea) Fauna along the Damodar River bed Agro-Ecosystem of West Bengal". Recent Advances in Ecobiological Research. Vol. 1. New Delhi: A.P.H. Publishing. pp. 399–426. OCLC 59358717.
