= Chrotogonus senegalensis =

Scientific classification
- Kingdom: Animalia
- Phylum: Arthropoda
- Clade: Pancrustacea
- Class: Insecta
- Order: Orthoptera
- Suborder: Caelifera
- Family: Pyrgomorphidae
- Tribe: Chrotogonini
- Genus: Chrotogonus
- Species: C. senegalensis

Binomial name
- Chrotogonus senegalensis Krauss, 1877

Species of grasshopper

Chrotogonus senegalensis is a species of grasshopper in the family Pyrgomorphidae. It is found in the Sahel of Africa and in Central Africa.

It is also found in the Dogon Country of Mali, where the Dogon people refer to it as a "small toad grasshopper".
