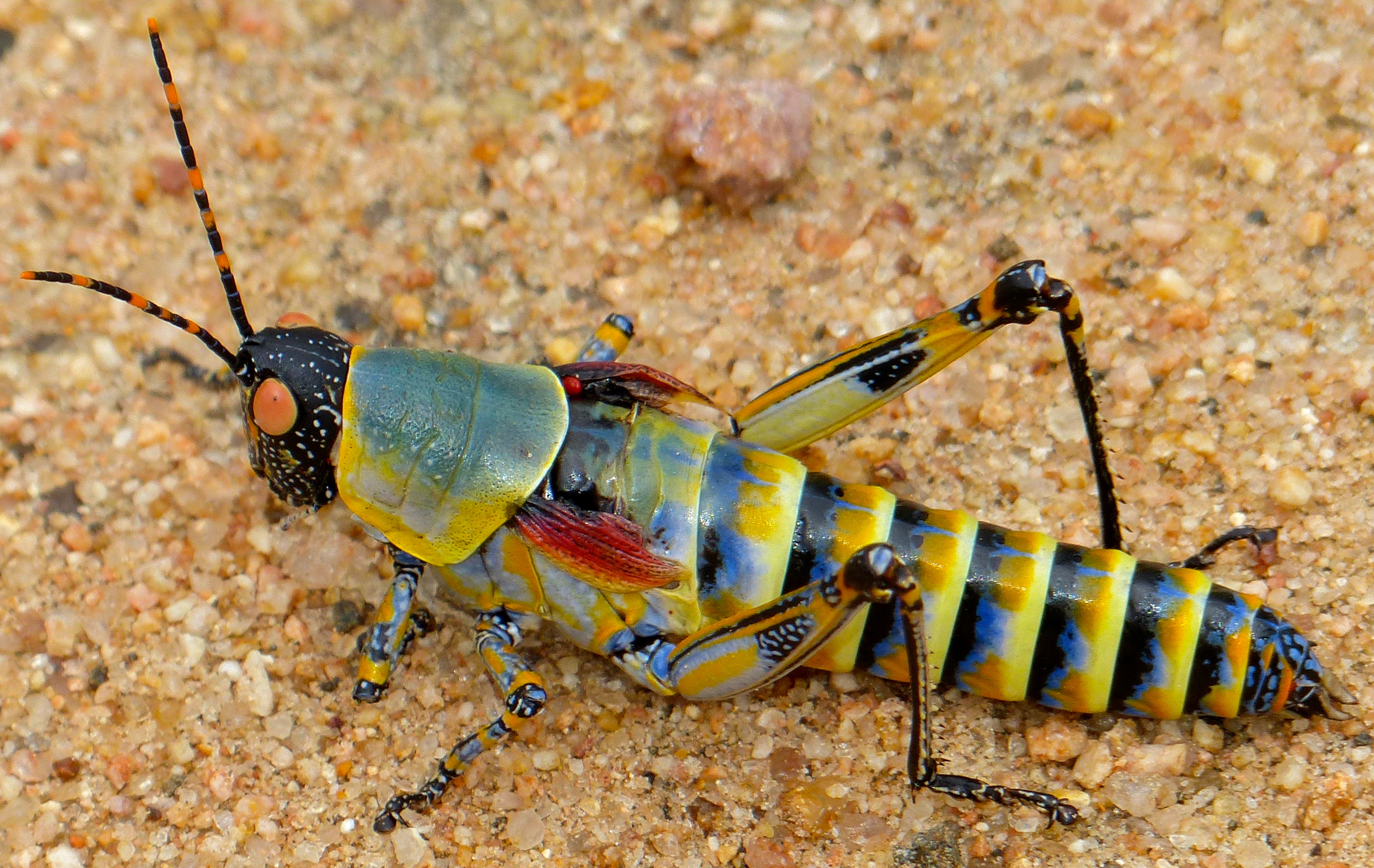

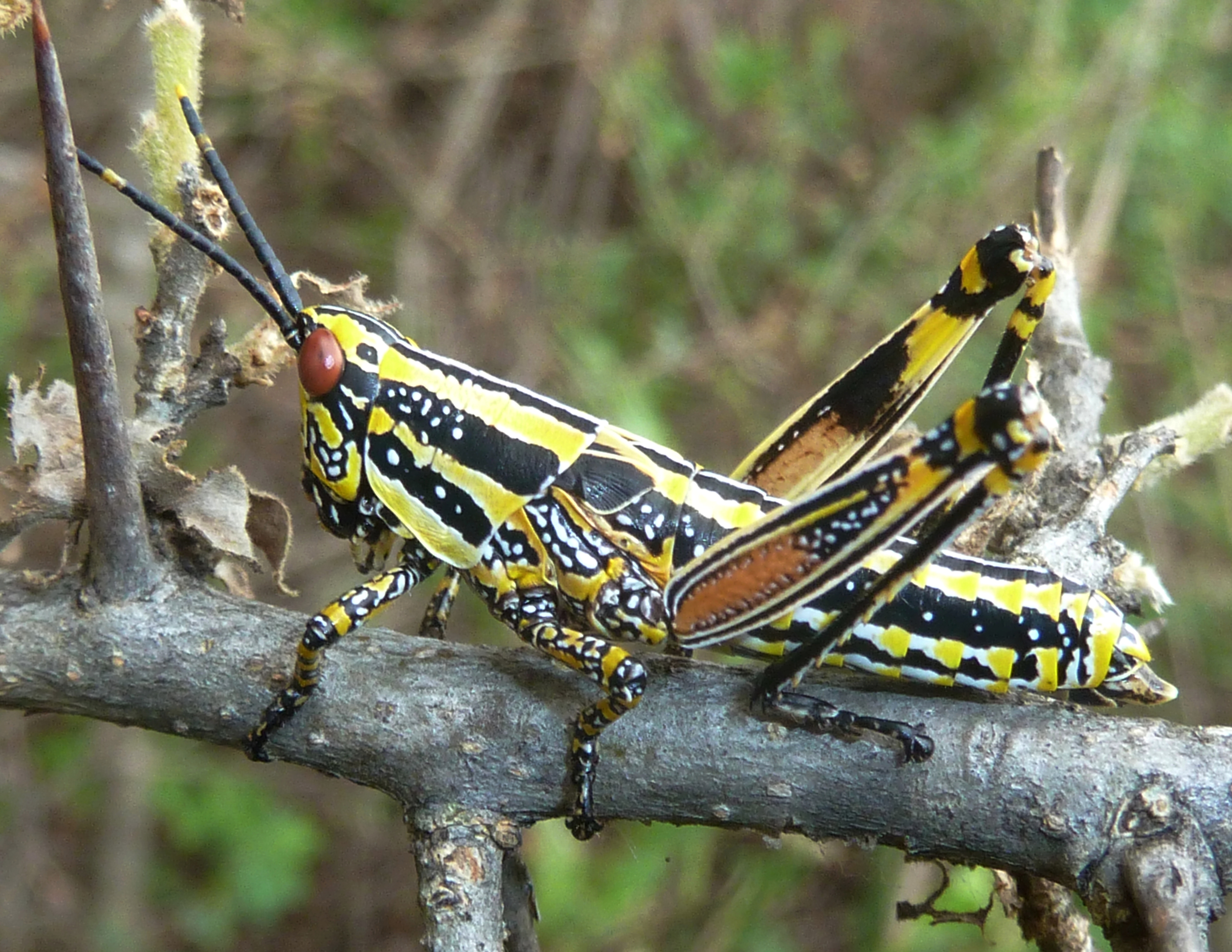
- adult and nymph

Scientific classification
- Kingdom: Animalia
- Phylum: Arthropoda
- Clade: Pancrustacea
- Class: Insecta
- Order: Orthoptera
- Suborder: Caelifera
- Family: Pyrgomorphidae
- Subfamily: Pyrgomorphinae
- Tribe: Phymateini
- Genus: Zonocerus
- Species: Z. elegans

Binomial name
- Zonocerus elegans (Thunberg, 1815)

= Zonocerus elegans =

Elegant grasshopper

Species of gaudy grasshopper

Zonocerus elegans is a common species of gaudy grasshopper in the family Pyrgomorphidae. It is native to Madagascar and sub-Saharan African savannah, though mainly south of the equator. It has sluggish habits and in many, underdeveloped wings. Adults measure some 3 to 5 cm (1.2 to 2.0 in) long, with males being smaller. Its life cycle is synchronized with rainfall.

== Description ==
The head is mainly black and the eyes orange, with the antennae placed between the latter. The antennae are banded orange and black, to which the generic name alludes. The shield (pronotum) is olive in colour, and the abdomen is banded in stark colours. Some do have long front (tegmina) and hind wings and can fly. Even these macropterous forms are poor flyers though. The pied nymphs are gregarious.

== Habits ==
Mainly a savannah species which avoids dense forest and desert. It is a pest of various crops, especially those under irrigation. Affected crops include onions, amaranth, cashew nuts, pineapples, citrus, coffee, taro, cucurbits, carrots, yam, sunflowers, sweet potatoes, cassava, banana, tobacco and avocado. Native plants of the Asclepias, Senecio and Solanum genera are also favoured, besides the invasive siam weed. Shrubs may be completely defoliated, and cassava may be debarked. They can exude an offensive, frothy fluid from a dorsal gland, and this is advertised by their aposematic colours. It is particularly attracted to pyrrolizidine alkaloids.

== Subspecies ==
These subspecies belong to the species Zonocerus elegans:

- Zonocerus elegans angolensis Kevan, 1972 – southwestern Angola
- Zonocerus elegans elegans (Thunberg, 1815)
