= Tanita (genus) =

Scientific classification
- Kingdom: Animalia
- Phylum: Arthropoda
- Clade: Pancrustacea
- Class: Insecta
- Order: Orthoptera
- Suborder: Caelifera
- Family: Pyrgomorphidae
- Subfamily: Pyrgomorphinae
- Tribe: Pyrgomorphini
- Genus: Tanita; Bolívar, 1904

Synonyms
- Protagasta Bolívar, 1908

Genus of grasshoppers

External image
- Image at iNaturalist

Tanita is a genus of grasshoppers in the family Pyrgomorphidae, which lives in Africa.

== Species ==
The Orthoptera Species File lists the following:

1. Tanita brachyptera Bolívar, 1912
2. Tanita breviceps (Bolívar, 1882) - type species (as Pyrgomorpha breviceps Bolívar, I., by subsequent designation)
3. Tanita lineaalba (Bolívar, 1889)
4. Tanita loosi Bolívar, 1904
5. Tanita parva Kevan, 1962
6. Tanita purpurea Bolívar, 1904
7. Tanita rosea (Bolívar, 1908)
8. Tanita stulta Bolívar, 1912
9. Tanita subcylindrica (Bolívar, 1882)
