= Chlorizeina unicolor =

Scientific classification
- Domain: Eukaryota
- Kingdom: Animalia
- Phylum: Arthropoda
- Class: Insecta
- Order: Orthoptera
- Suborder: Caelifera
- Family: Pyrgomorphidae
- Genus: Chlorizeina
- Species: C. unicolor

Binomial name
- Chlorizeina unicolor Brunner von Wattenwyl, 1893

Subspecies
- See text

Species of grasshopper

Chlorizeina unicolor is a species of grasshoppers in the subfamily Pyrgomorphinae found in Asia. It is the type species of its genus.

There are two subspecies:

- Chlorizeina unicolor roonwali Bhowmik, 1964
- Chlorizeina unicolor unicolor Brunner von Wattenwyl, 1893

The name Chlorizeina elegans Ramme. 1941 is a synonym for C. unicolor unicolor.
