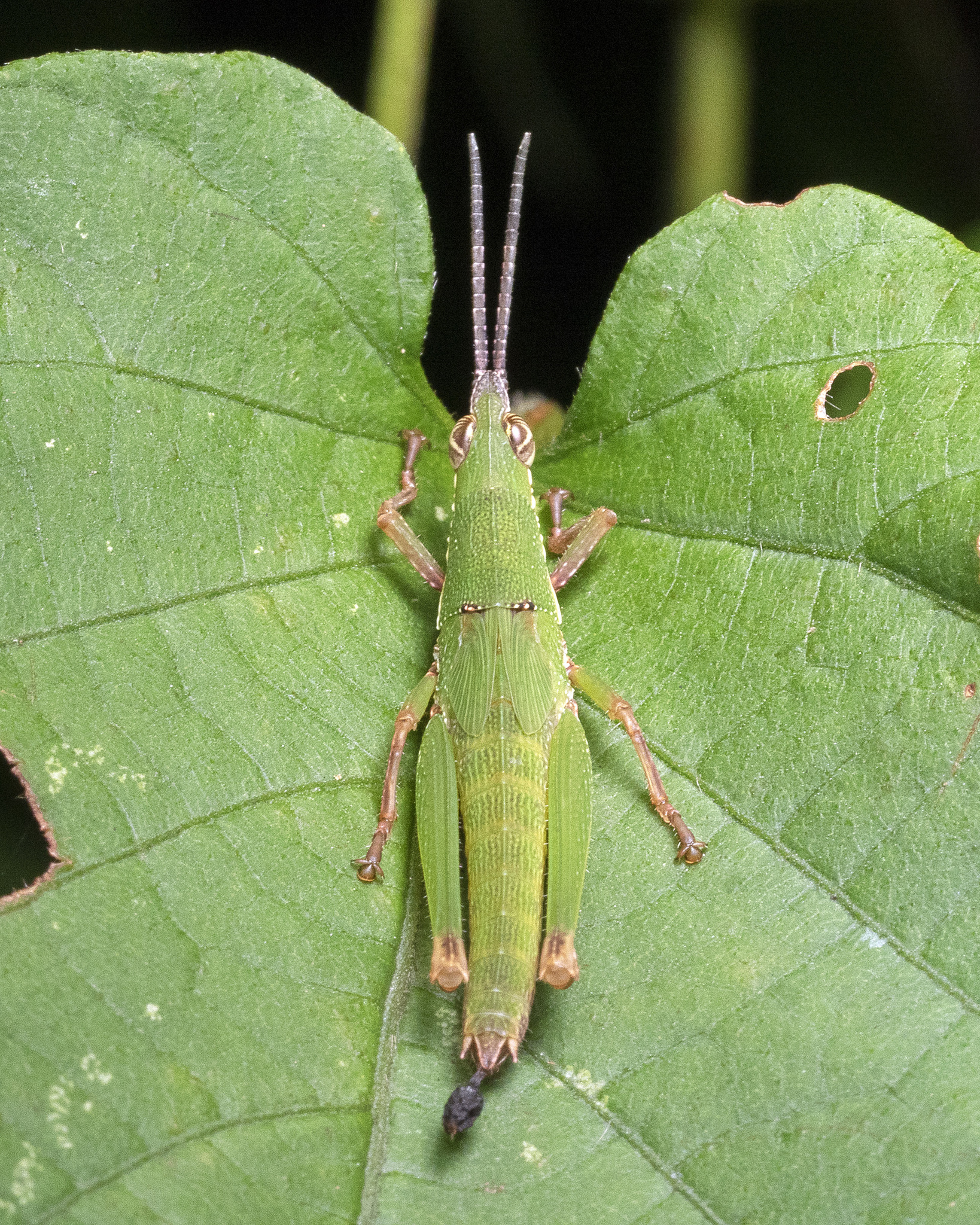
- Tagasta marginella in Kuala Lumpur, Malaysia

Scientific classification
- Domain: Eukaryota
- Kingdom: Animalia
- Phylum: Arthropoda
- Class: Insecta
- Order: Orthoptera
- Suborder: Caelifera
- Family: Pyrgomorphidae
- Subfamily: Pyrgomorphinae
- Tribe: Tagastini
- Genus: Tagasta; Bolívar, 1905

Type species
- Mestra hoplosterna Stål, 1877

= Tagasta =

Genus of grasshoppers

Tagasta is a genus of grasshoppers in the family Pyrgomorphidae, subfamily Pyrgomorphinae and tribe Tagastini. Species can be found around the Himalayan mountains, southern China, Indo-China and Malesia (including the Philippines). It was described in 1905.

== Species ==
The Orthoptera Species File lists:

1. Tagasta anoplosterna Stål, 1877
2. Tagasta brachyptera Liang, 1988
3. Tagasta celebesica Karsch, 1888
4. Tagasta gui Yin, Ye & Yin, 2009
5. Tagasta hoplosterna Stål, 1877
6. Tagasta indica Bolívar, 1905
7. Tagasta inornata Walker, 1870
8. Tagasta insularis Bolívar, 1905
9. Tagasta longipenne Balderson & Yin, 1987
10. Tagasta marginella Thunberg, 1815
11. Tagasta mizoramensis Gupta, Chandra & Yin, 2020
12. Tagasta nigritibia Mao & Li, 2015
13. Tagasta rufomaculata Bi, 1983
14. Tagasta striatipennis Ramme, 1941
15. Tagasta tonkinensis Bolívar, 1905
16. Tagasta yunnana Bi, 1983
