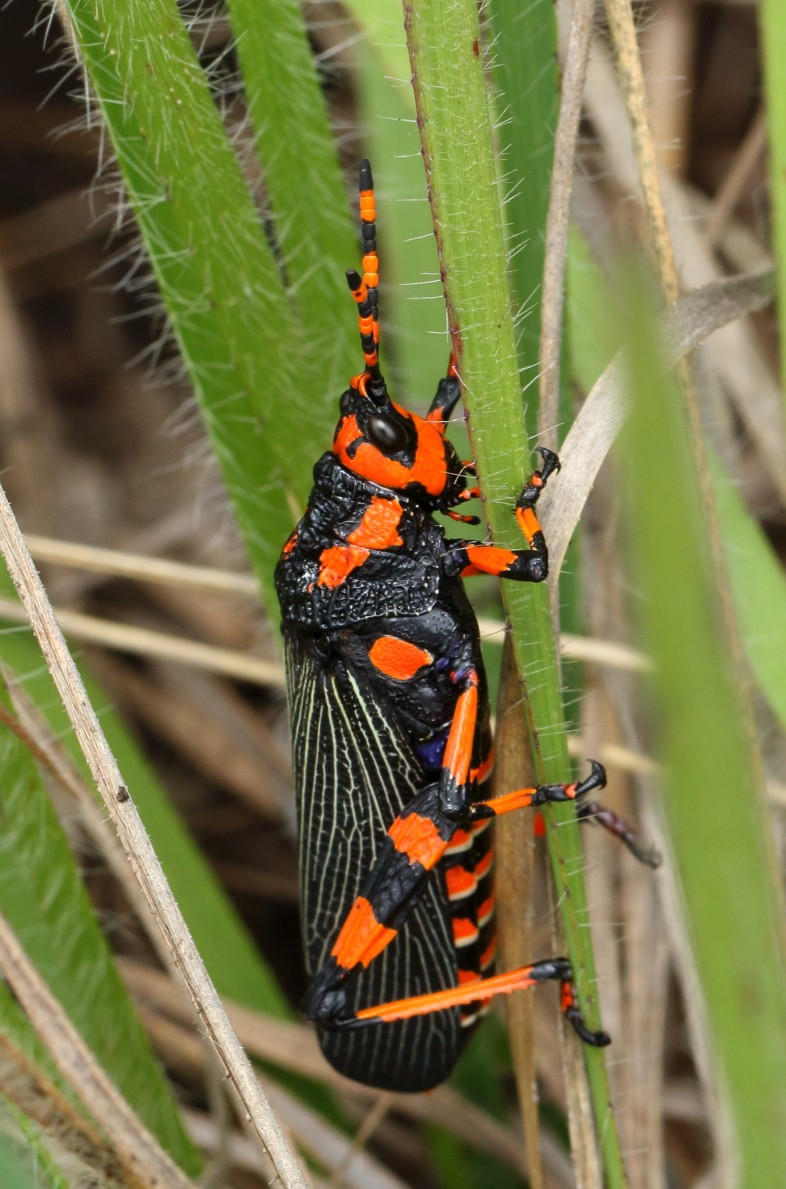
- Maura rubroornata

Scientific classification
- Kingdom: Animalia
- Phylum: Arthropoda
- Clade: Pancrustacea
- Class: Insecta
- Order: Orthoptera
- Suborder: Caelifera
- Family: Pyrgomorphidae
- Subfamily: Pyrgomorphinae
- Tribe: Dictyophorini
- Genus: Maura; Stål, 1873

= Maura (insect) =

Genus of grasshoppers

Maura is a genus of grasshoppers in the tribe Dictyophorini and the family Pyrgomorphidae; it is native to sub-Saharan Africa.

== Species ==
The Orthoptera Species File lists:

1. Maura bolivari Kirby, 1902
2. Maura lurida (Fabricius, 1781)
3. Maura marshalli Bolívar, 1904
4. Maura rubroornata (Stål, 1855) - type species (as Petasia rubroornata Stål)
