= Annandalea =

Scientific classification
- Domain: Eukaryota
- Kingdom: Animalia
- Phylum: Arthropoda
- Class: Insecta
- Order: Orthoptera
- Suborder: Caelifera
- Family: Pyrgomorphidae
- Subfamily: Pyrgomorphinae
- Tribe: Tagastini
- Genus: Annandalea; Bolívar, 1905

Genus of insects

Annandalea is a genus of Malesian, pyrgomorph grasshoppers in the tribe Tagastini; described by I. Bolívar in 1905.

== Species ==
- Annandalea haematoptera (Haan, 1842)
- Annandalea robinsoni Bolívar, 1905 - type species
