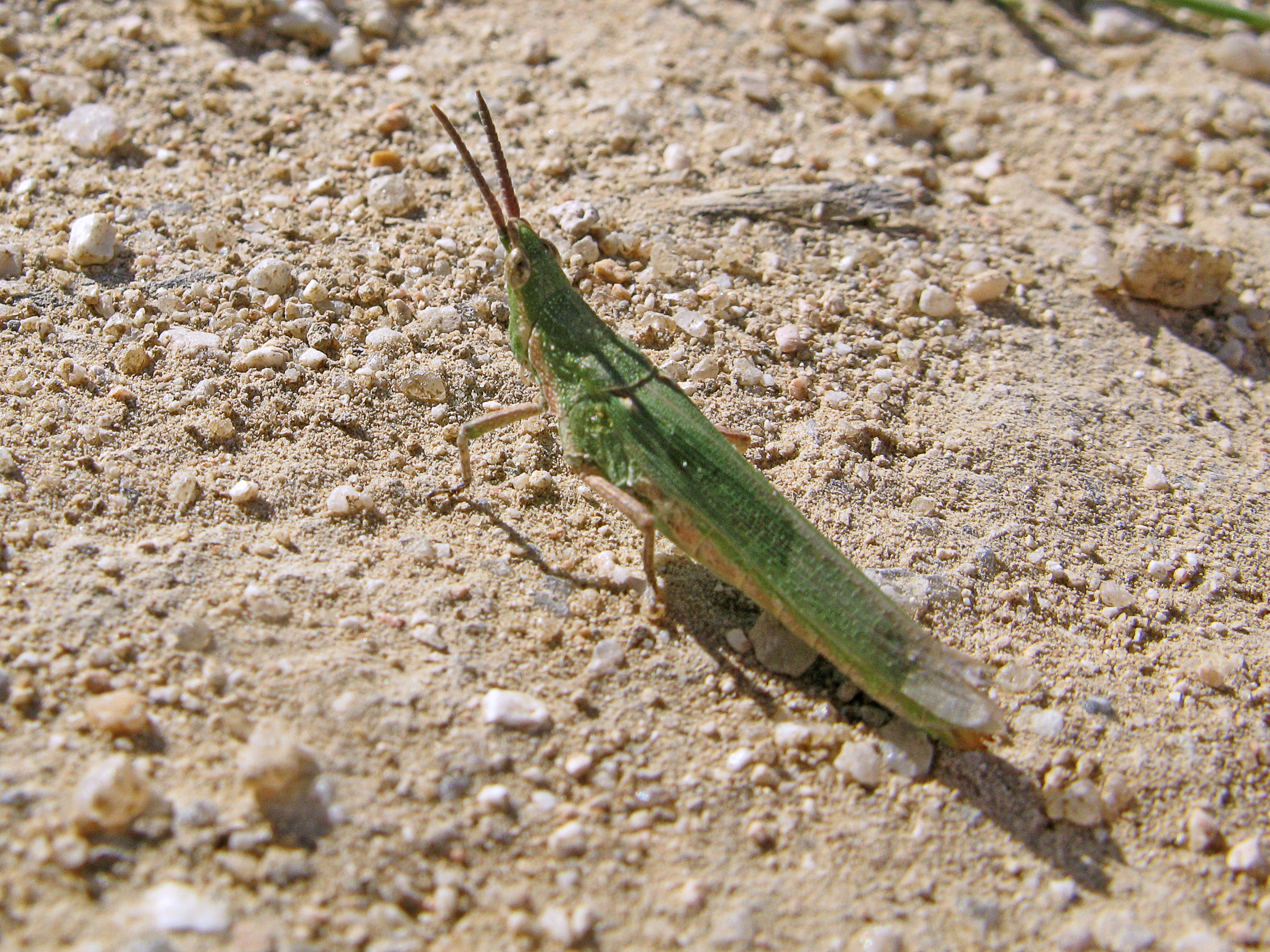

Scientific classification
- Kingdom: Animalia
- Phylum: Arthropoda
- Class: Insecta
- Order: Orthoptera
- Suborder: Caelifera
- Family: Pyrgomorphidae
- Genus: Pyrgomorpha
- Species: P. conica

Binomial name
- Pyrgomorpha conica (Olivier, 1791)

= Pyrgomorpha conica =

Species of grasshopper

Pyrgomorpha conica is a species of pyrgomorph (gaudy grasshoppers) native to Africa, Western Asia and Southern Europe.
