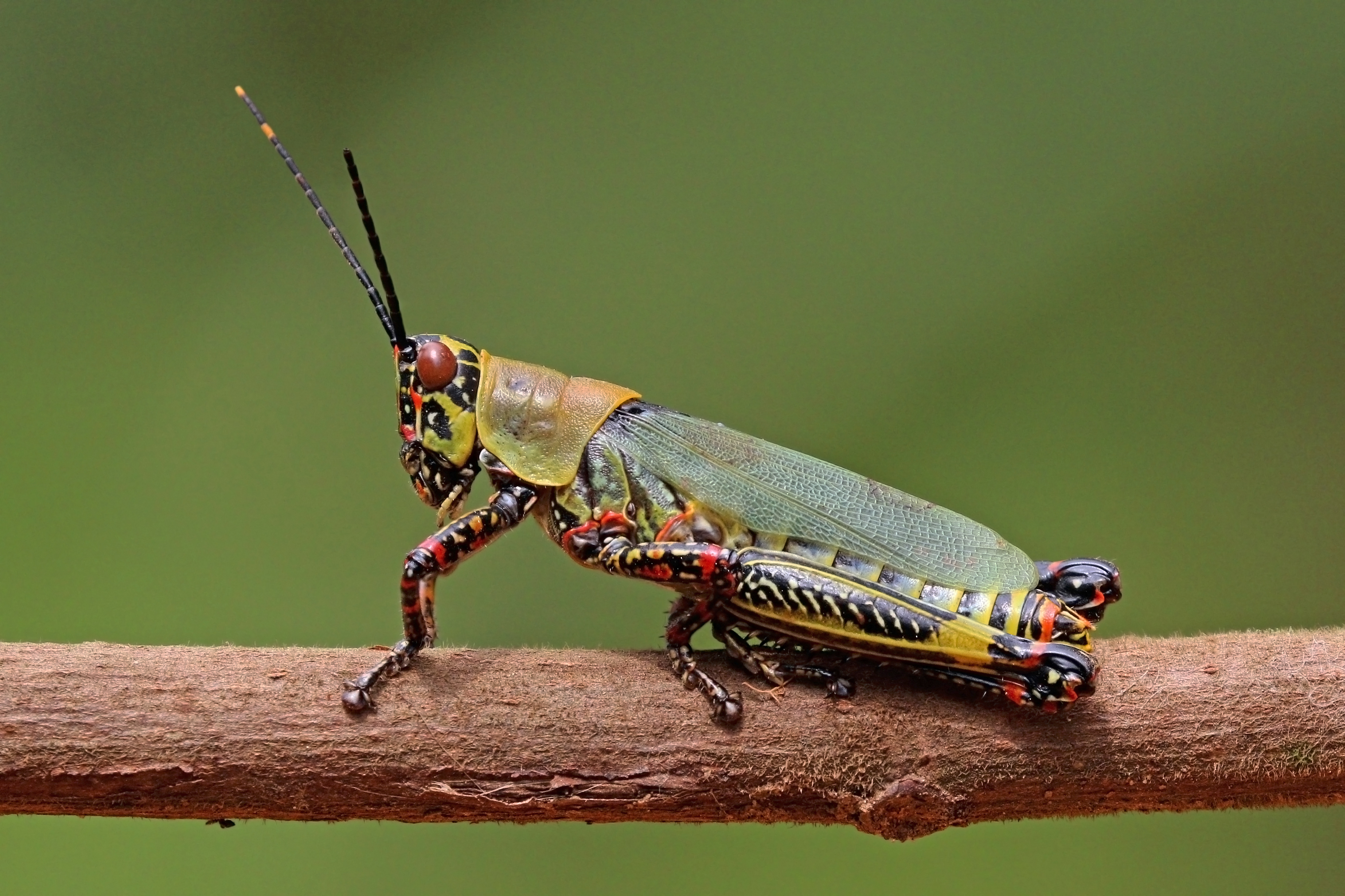

Scientific classification
- Kingdom: Animalia
- Phylum: Arthropoda
- Class: Insecta
- Order: Orthoptera
- Suborder: Caelifera
- Family: Pyrgomorphidae
- Genus: Zonocerus
- Species: Z. variegatus

Binomial name
- Zonocerus variegatus (Linnaeus, 1758)

= Zonocerus variegatus =

Species of grasshopper

Zonocerus variegatus, the painted grasshopper or variegated grasshopper, is a species of insect belonging to the family Pyrgomorphidae. It is native to tropical Africa, and is considered a crop pest in much of Western and Central Africa.

== Description ==
The adult grasshopper is extremely colourful, having large red compound eyes, a boldly patterned black, white, red and yellow body and legs, and greenish membranous wings. The nymphs also have red eyes, but lack wings and are black, with yellow and white markings.

== Distribution and habitat ==
Zonocerus variegatus is native to tropical West and Central Africa. It is an important agricultural pest in Ghana, Togo, Ivory Coast, Nigeria, Congo Brazzaville, Southern Benin, and the Sahel region. It is a polyphagous insect, feeding on numerous different plants.

== Ecology ==
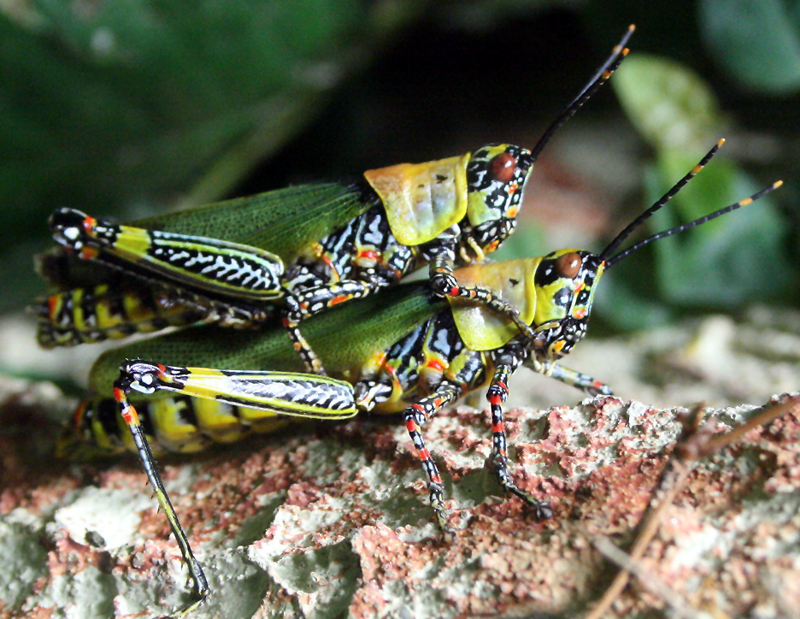
Mating pair; male above, female below

Both nymphs and mature Zonocerus variegatus cause damage to crops, particularly cassava, groundnuts and vegetables, and it has been implicated in transmitting mosaic viruses of cowpea and okra. The worst crop damage occurs in humid areas, on the edges of forests and near recently cleared, fallow ground with herbaceous plants. When forests are cleared, the plant Chromolaena odorata often invades the cleared area; it is a favoured food plant of Zonocerus variegatus, the populations of which swell as a result and spread to nearby cultivated areas. Perennial crops are less affected than annuals.

== Uses ==
There is a long tradition in Africa and Asia of eating insects, and these provide a high quality source of animal protein, nutritionally superior to beef and chicken. Grasshoppers are the most widely eaten insect and Zonocerus variegatus is a common species that has been eaten traditionally for centuries. In the dry season in northern Nigeria, the grasshoppers are gathered from grasses and bushes before dawn, when the insects are quiescent. They are then de-winged, salted and fried.

The insects contain about 10% chitin, the derivatives of which are of interest in medical research, in industry and agriculture, for the manufacture of biodegradable plastics, in wound repair, as a crop booster, and as a nematicide and fungicide.
