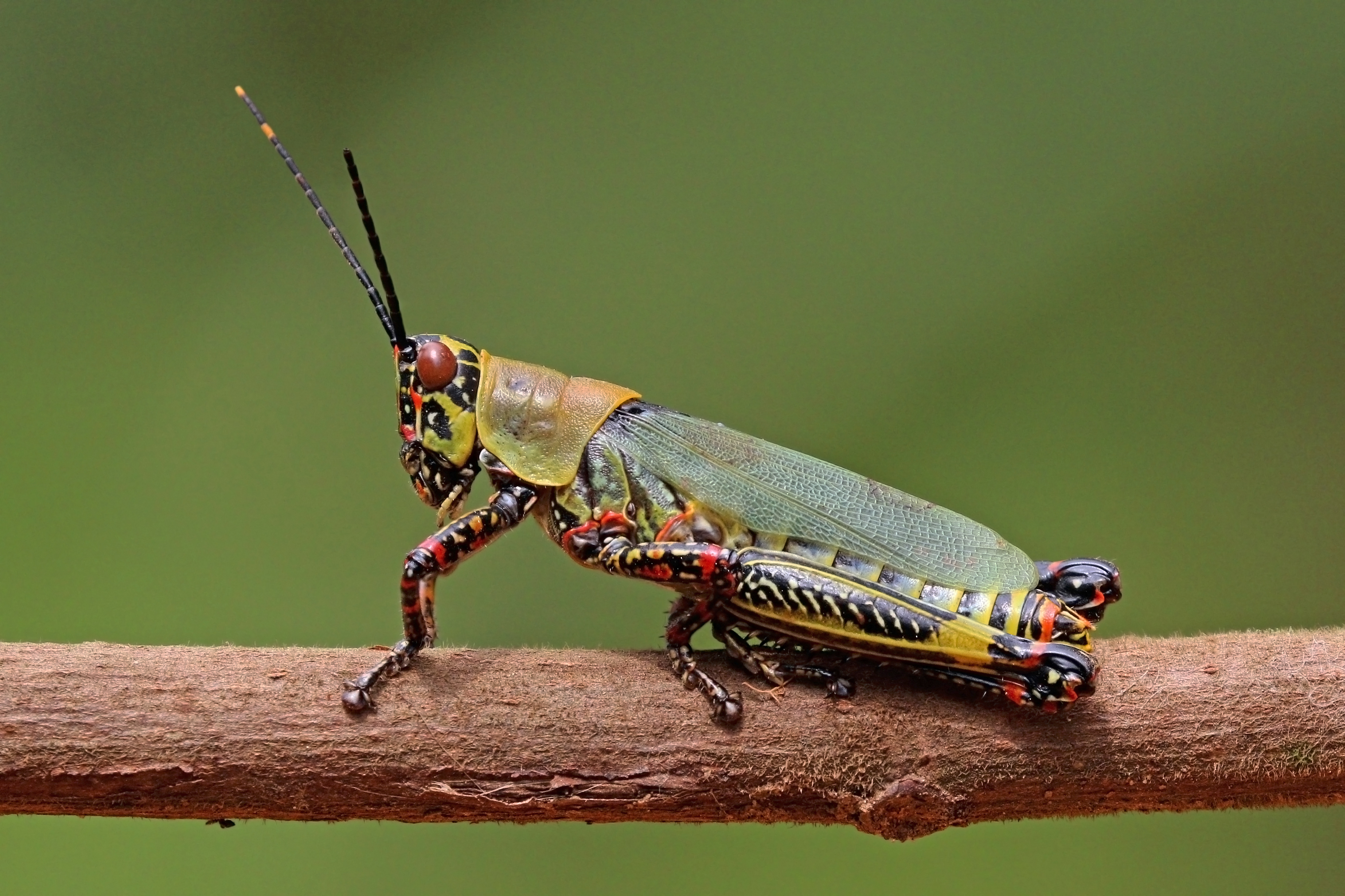
- Zonocerus variegatus

Scientific classification
- Domain: Eukaryota
- Kingdom: Animalia
- Phylum: Arthropoda
- Class: Insecta
- Order: Orthoptera
- Suborder: Caelifera
- Family: Pyrgomorphidae
- Subfamily: Pyrgomorphinae
- Tribe: Phymateini
- Genus: Zonocerus; Stål, 1873

Species
- See text

= Zonocerus =

Genus of grasshoppers

Zonocerus is a genus of African grasshoppers (Caelifera) in the family Pyrgomorphidae and the tribe Phymateini. Zonocerus elegans is found in central, eastern and southern regions, including Madagascar, and Z. variegatus found in western regions.

== Description ==
Both species are significant agricultural pests, defoliating crops of African smallholder farmers. Both adults and nymphs have relatively bright, aposematic colours, and adults typically are about 3–5 cm (1.2–2.0 in) long.

== Species ==
The Orthoptera Species File and Catalogue of Life list the following:

- Zonocerus elegans (Thunberg, 1815) – type species (as "Gryllus elegans" Thunberg)
- Zonocerus variegatus (Linnaeus, 1758)

== Gallery ==
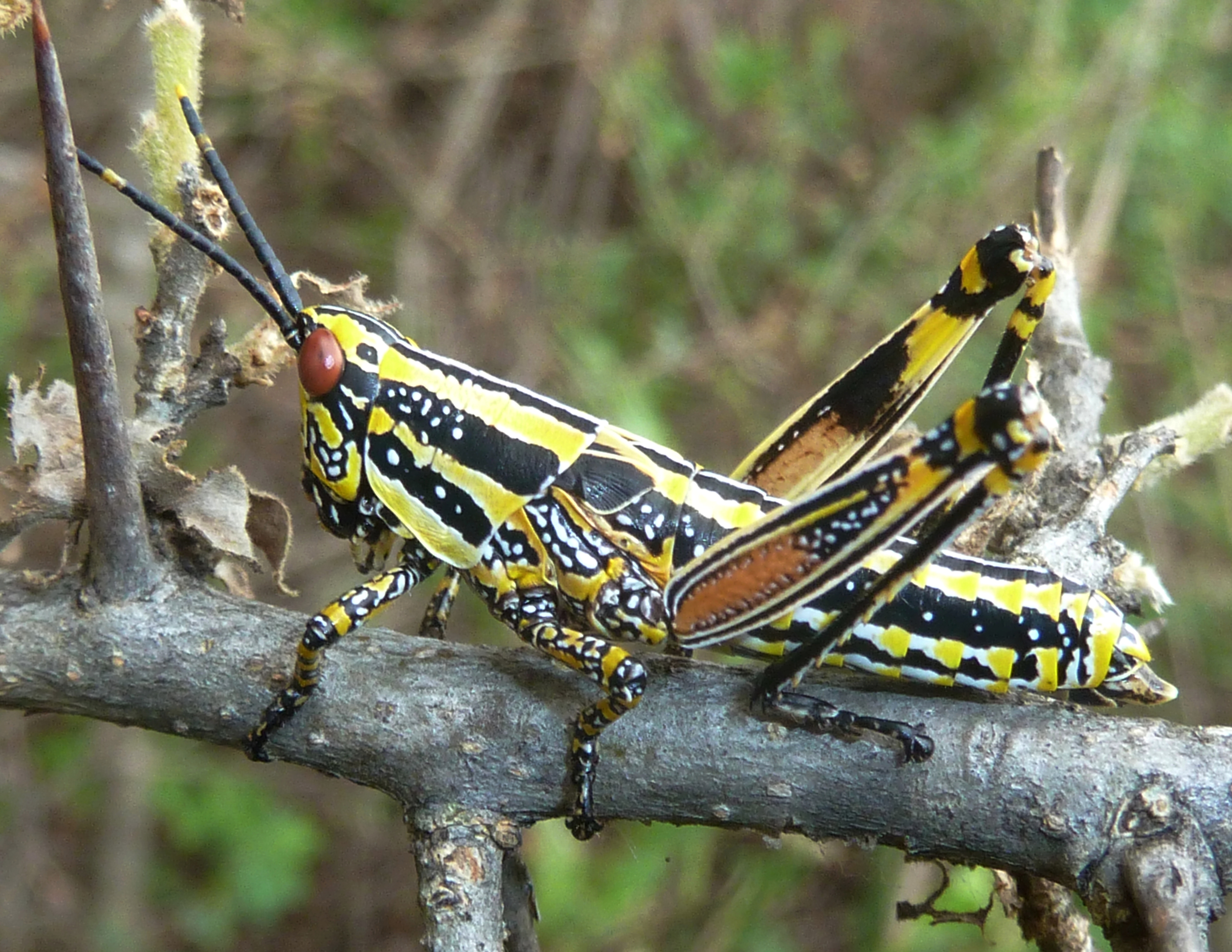
Z. elegans nymph

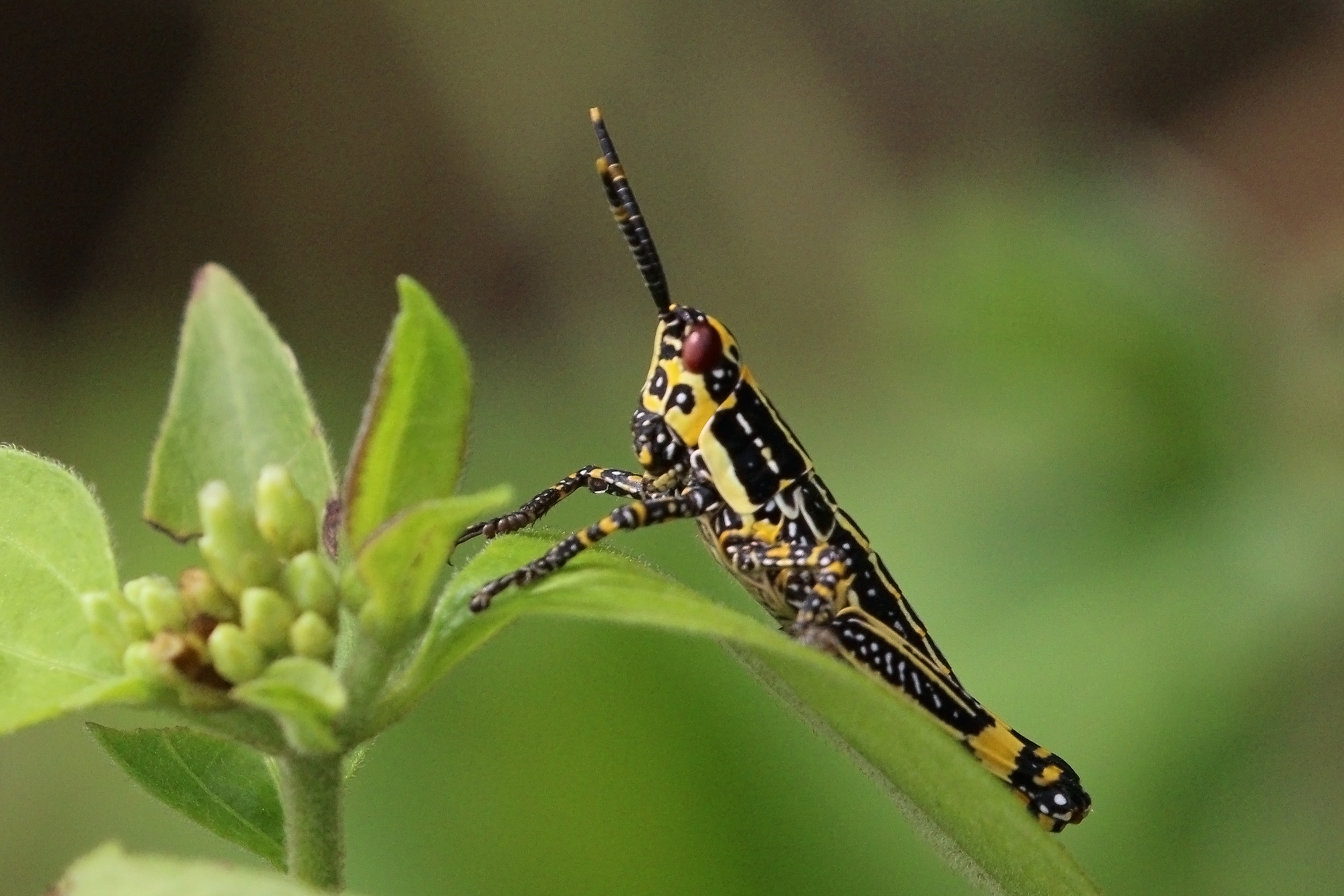
Z. variegatus nymph

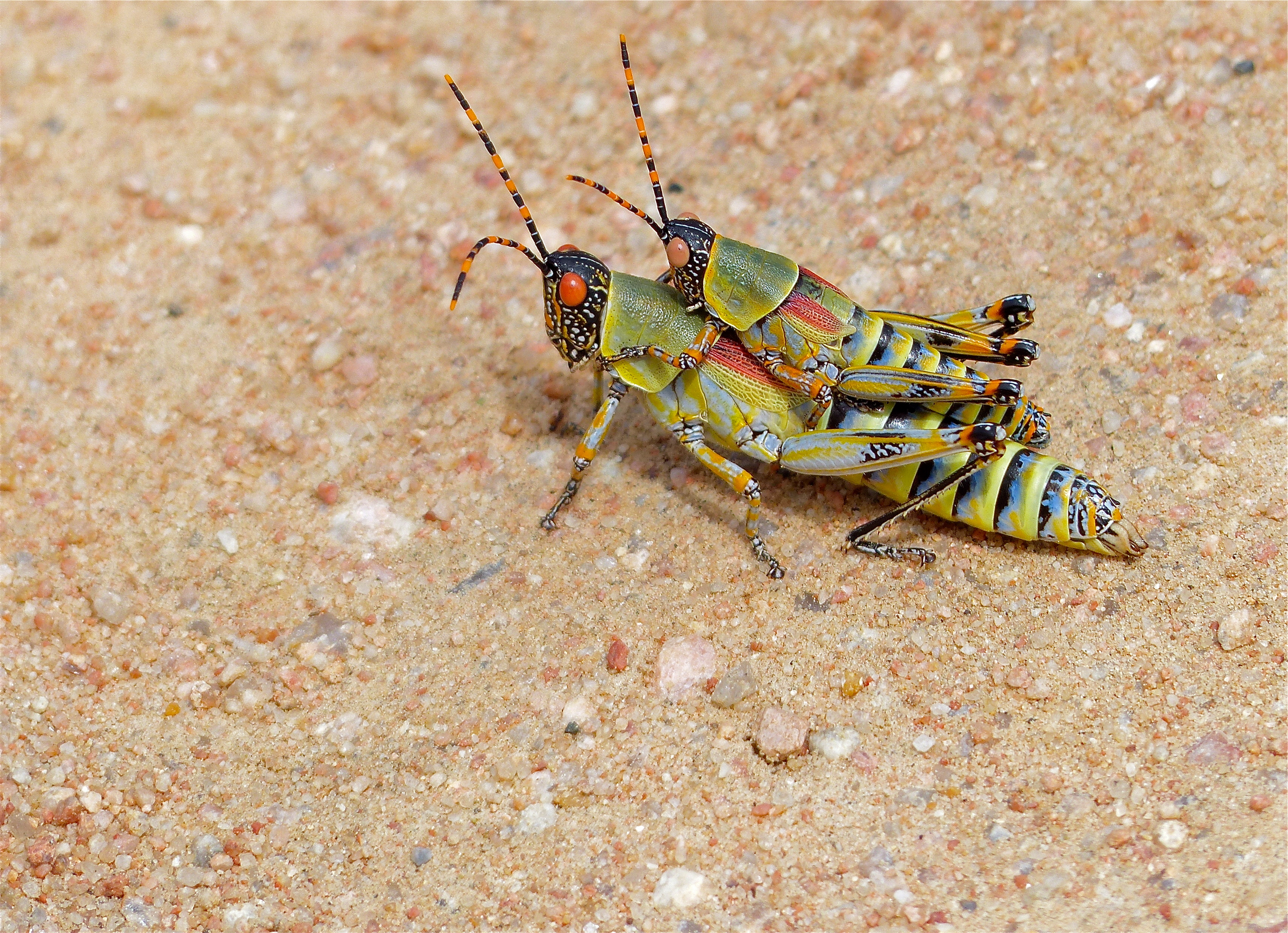
Z. elegans, mating pair
