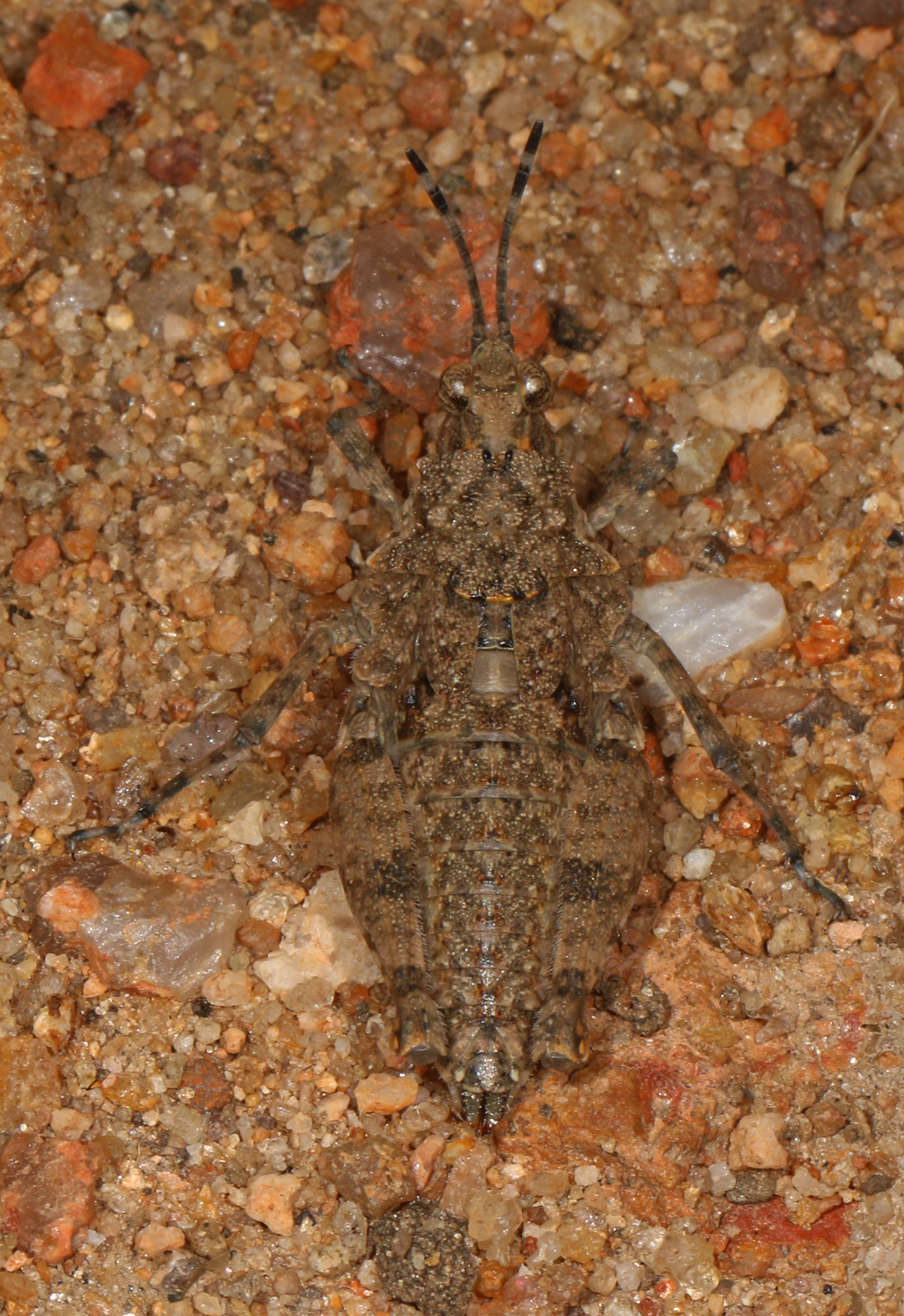

Scientific classification
- Kingdom: Animalia
- Phylum: Arthropoda
- Class: Insecta
- Order: Orthoptera
- Suborder: Caelifera
- Family: Pyrgomorphidae
- Genus: Chrotogonus
- Species: C. hemipterus

Binomial name
- Chrotogonus hemipterus Schaum, 1853

= Chrotogonus hemipterus =

Species of grasshopper

Chrotogonus hemipterus is a species of grasshopper in the family Pyrgomorphidae. It is a pest of millets in India.
