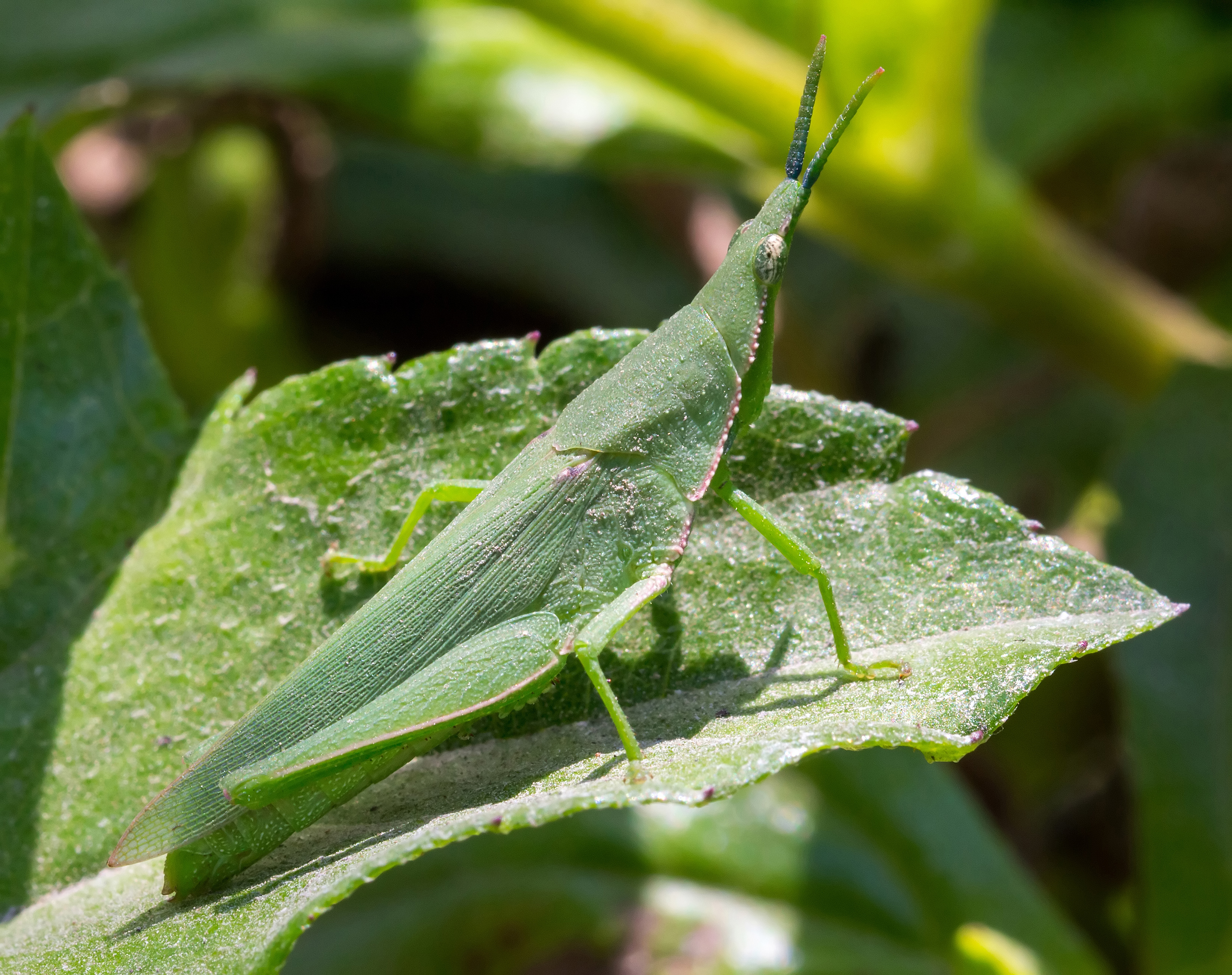
- Atractomorpha crenulata

Scientific classification
- Kingdom: Animalia
- Phylum: Arthropoda
- Clade: Pancrustacea
- Class: Insecta
- Order: Orthoptera
- Suborder: Caelifera
- Family: Pyrgomorphidae
- Subfamily: Pyrgomorphinae
- Tribe: Atractomorphini
- Genus: Atractomorpha; Saussure, 1862

Species
- See text

= Atractomorpha (grasshopper) =

Genus of grasshoppers

Atractomorpha is a genus in the Pyrgomorphidae, a family of grasshoppers, found in Africa, Asia, and Australia.

== Biology ==
Not much is written about the biology of the Atractomorpha, but they are herbivores typical of the Orthoptera, so it is understandable that some species seem to be minor pests in gardens and that some, such as Atractomorpha psittacina and Atractomorpha bedeli, are significant pests in rice.

As with many grasshoppers in various families, the males are smaller than the females and ride on them long before copulation. They remain there during the period in which the female achieves sexual receptiveness. Similar strategies are common in vertebrates such as some amphibians, as well as various invertebrates, where the males attempt to keep rivals from mating with the female.

At least some Atractomorpha species also share a habit with various generally sedentary Orthoptera such as some Pamphagidae, of producing their excreta in the form of relatively few, large, elongated faecal pellets, one at a time. As each pellet emerges, they kick it a considerable distance away, using the tibia of one rear leg. This apparently is a strategy for avoiding the attentions of parasitoids and predators that otherwise might have been attracted to the smell of a host midden.

Atractomorpha are active during the day, and their usual habitat is reeds and grasses close to rivers or streams.

== Taxonomy ==
The genus name Atractomorpha is derived from the Greek language and means "spindle-shaped" or "arrow-shaped". Various families of Orthoptera (including the Acrididae and Lentulidae) include genera whose species have similarly cone-shaped heads, and there are genera within the family Pyrgomorphidae (such as Phymateus and Dictyophorus) that do not have cone-shaped heads, so their superficial appearance may be misleading even for professionals not specifically active in that field.

=== Species ===
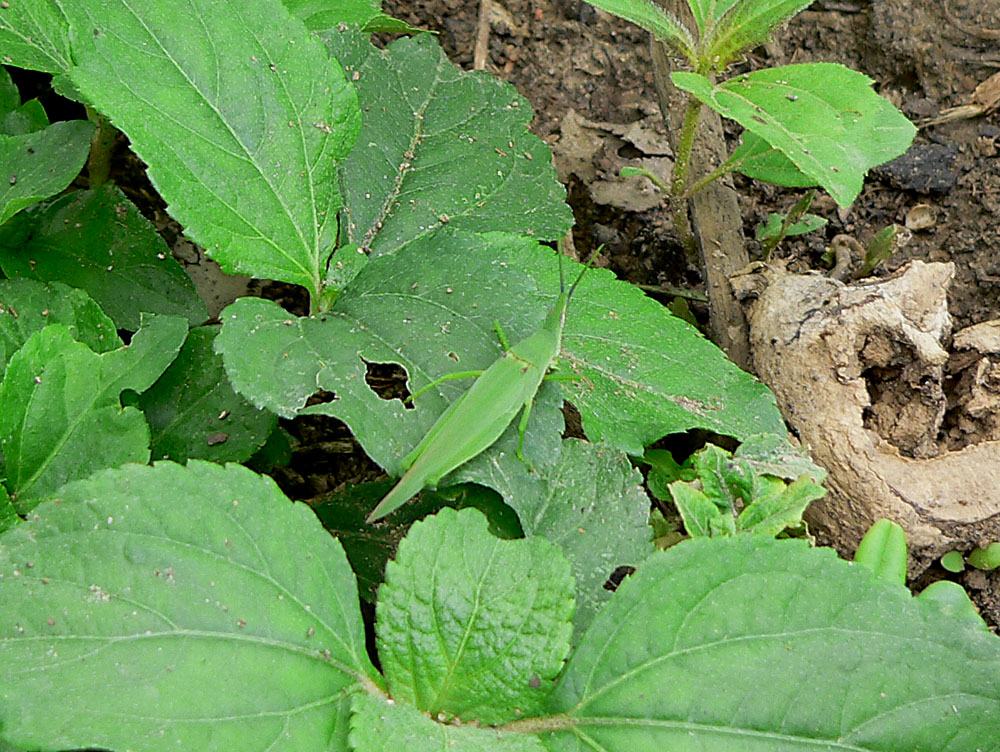
Atractomorpha acutipennis female: Cameroon

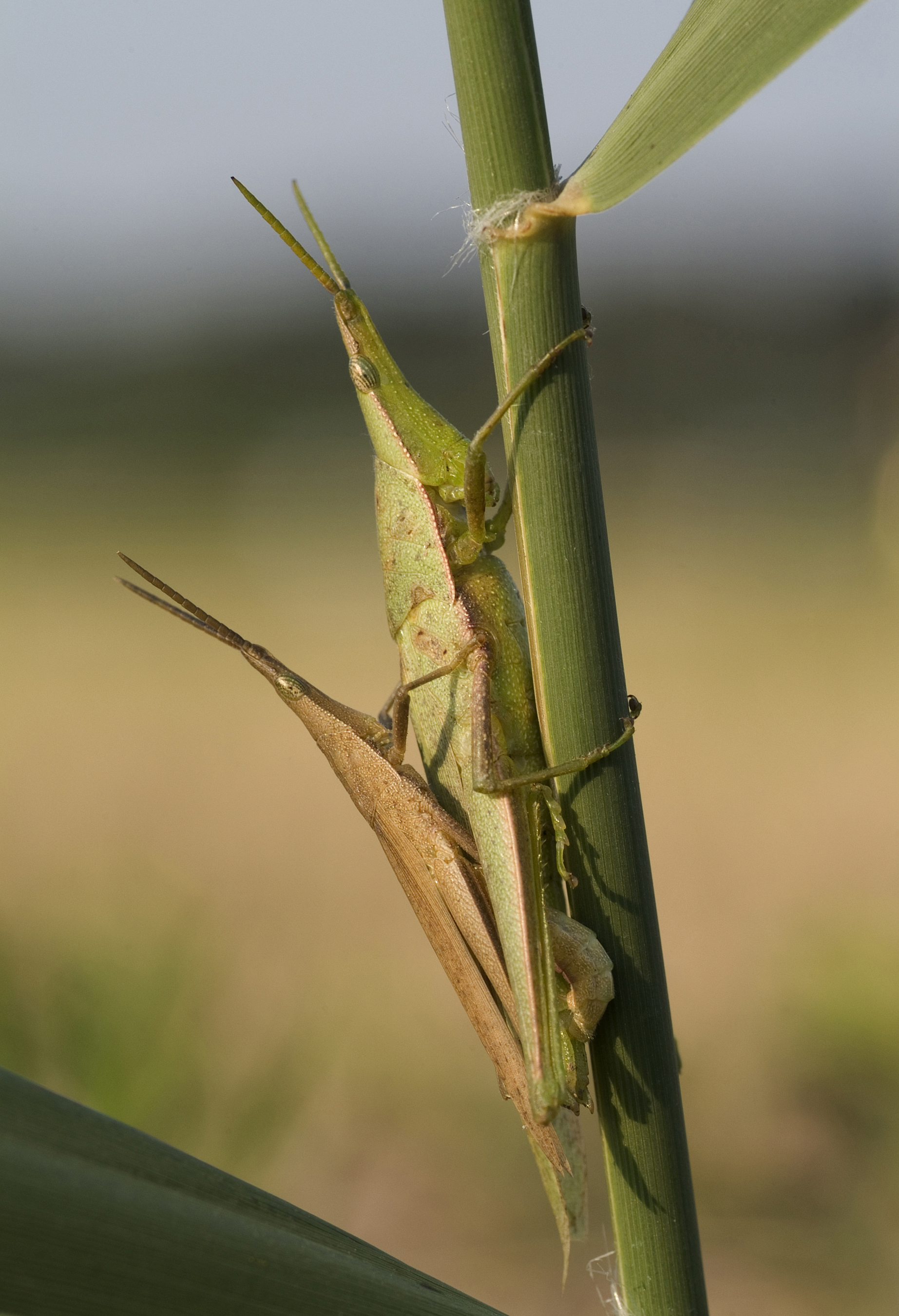
Atractomorpha lata male (left) and female (right) in full copulation

The Orthoptera Species File includes:

1. Atractomorpha aberrans Karsch, 1888
2. Atractomorpha acutipennis (Guérin-Méneville, 1844)
3. Atractomorpha angusta Karsch, 1888
4. Atractomorpha australis Rehn, 1907
5. Atractomorpha burri Bolívar, 1905
6. Atractomorpha crenaticeps (Blanchard, 1853)
7. Atractomorpha crenulata (Fabricius, 1793) - type species (as Truxalis crenulatus Fabricius)
8. Atractomorpha dubia Wang, Xiangyu, He & Mu, 1995
9. Atractomorpha fuscipennis Liang, 1988
10. Atractomorpha himalayica Bolívar, 1905
11. Atractomorpha hypoestes Key & Kevan, 1980
12. Atractomorpha lata (Mochulsky, 1866)
13. Atractomorpha melanostriga Bi, 1981
14. Atractomorpha micropenna Zheng, 1992
15. Atractomorpha nigripennis Zheng, 2000
16. Atractomorpha occidentalis Kevan & Chen, 1969
17. Atractomorpha orientalis Kevan & Chen, 1969
18. Atractomorpha peregrina Bi & Xia, 1981
19. Atractomorpha psittacina (Haan, 1842)
20. Atractomorpha rhodoptera Karsch, 1888
21. Atractomorpha rufopunctata Bolívar, 1894
22. Atractomorpha sagittaris Bi & Xia, 1981
23. Atractomorpha similis Bolívar, 1884
24. Atractomorpha sinensis Bolívar, 1905
25. Atractomorpha suzhouensis Bi & Xia, 1981
26. Atractomorpha taiwanensis Yin & Shi, 2007
27. Atractomorpha yunnanensis Bi & Xia, 1981
