= Chrotogonus =

Scientific classification
- Domain: Eukaryota
- Kingdom: Animalia
- Phylum: Arthropoda
- Class: Insecta
- Order: Orthoptera
- Suborder: Caelifera
- Family: Pyrgomorphidae
- Tribe: Chrotogonini
- Genus: Chrotogonus; Serville, 1838

Genus of insects

Chrotogonus is a genus of grasshoppers belonging to the family Pyrgomorphidae.

The species of this genus are found in Africa and Southern Asia.

Species:

- Chrotogonus arenicola Kevan, 1952
- Chrotogonus armatus Steinmann, 1965
- Chrotogonus brachypterus Bolívar, 1902
- Chrotogonus hemipterus Schaum, 1853
- Chrotogonus homalodemus (Blanchard, 1836)
- Chrotogonus oxypterus (Blanchard, 1836)
- Chrotogonus senegalensis Krauss, 1877
- Chrotogonus trachypterus (Blanchard, 1836)
- Chrotogonus tuberculatus Kevan, 1959
- Chrotogonus turanicus Kuthy, 1905
