= Rubellia =

Scientific classification
- Kingdom: Animalia
- Phylum: Arthropoda
- Clade: Pancrustacea
- Class: Insecta
- Order: Orthoptera
- Suborder: Caelifera
- Family: Pyrgomorphidae
- Subfamily: Pyrgomorphinae
- Tribe: Sphenariini
- Subtribe: Rubelliina; Kevan & Akbar, 1964
- Genus: Rubellia; Stål, 1875
- Species: R. nigrosignata

Binomial name
- Rubellia nigrosignata Stål, 1875

Genus of grasshoppers

Rubellia is a genus of grasshoppers described by Carl Stål in 1875, in the tribe Sphenariini and monotypic subtribe Rubelliina. It appears to be monotypic, containing Rubellia nigrosignata (Stål, 1875). It is endemic to the island of Madagascar.
