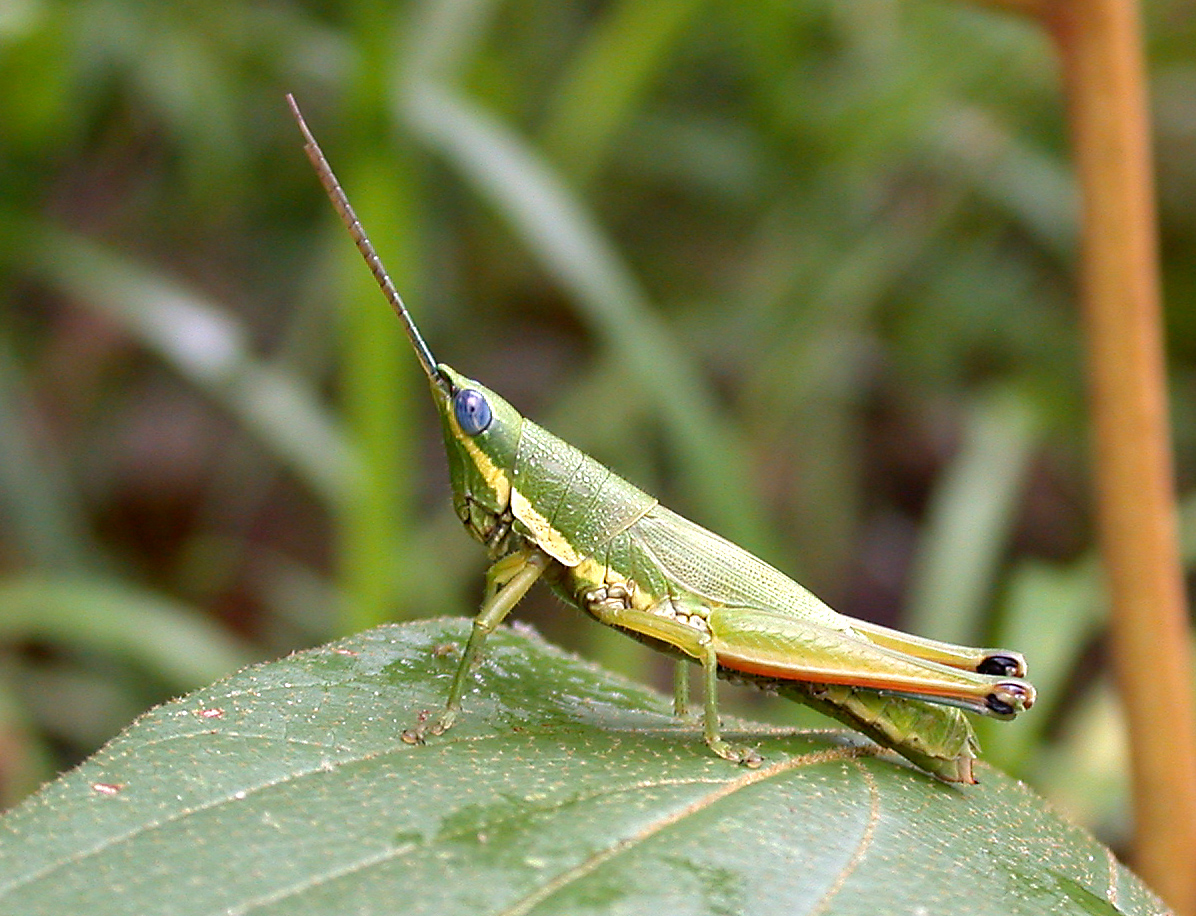
- Chlorizeina feae

Scientific classification
- Domain: Eukaryota
- Kingdom: Animalia
- Phylum: Arthropoda
- Class: Insecta
- Order: Orthoptera
- Suborder: Caelifera
- Family: Pyrgomorphidae
- Subfamily: Pyrgomorphinae
- Tribe: Chlorizeinini
- Subtribe: Chlorizeinina
- Genus: Chlorizeina; Brunner von Wattenwyl, 1893

Species
- Chlorizeina feae Kevan, 1969; Chlorizeina togulata Rehn, 1951; Chlorizeina unicolor Brunner von Wattenwyl, 1893 (type); Chlorizeina yunnana Mao & Li, 2015

= Chlorizeina =

Genus of grasshoppers

Chlorizeina is a genus of grasshoppers in the subfamily Pyrgomorphinae.
