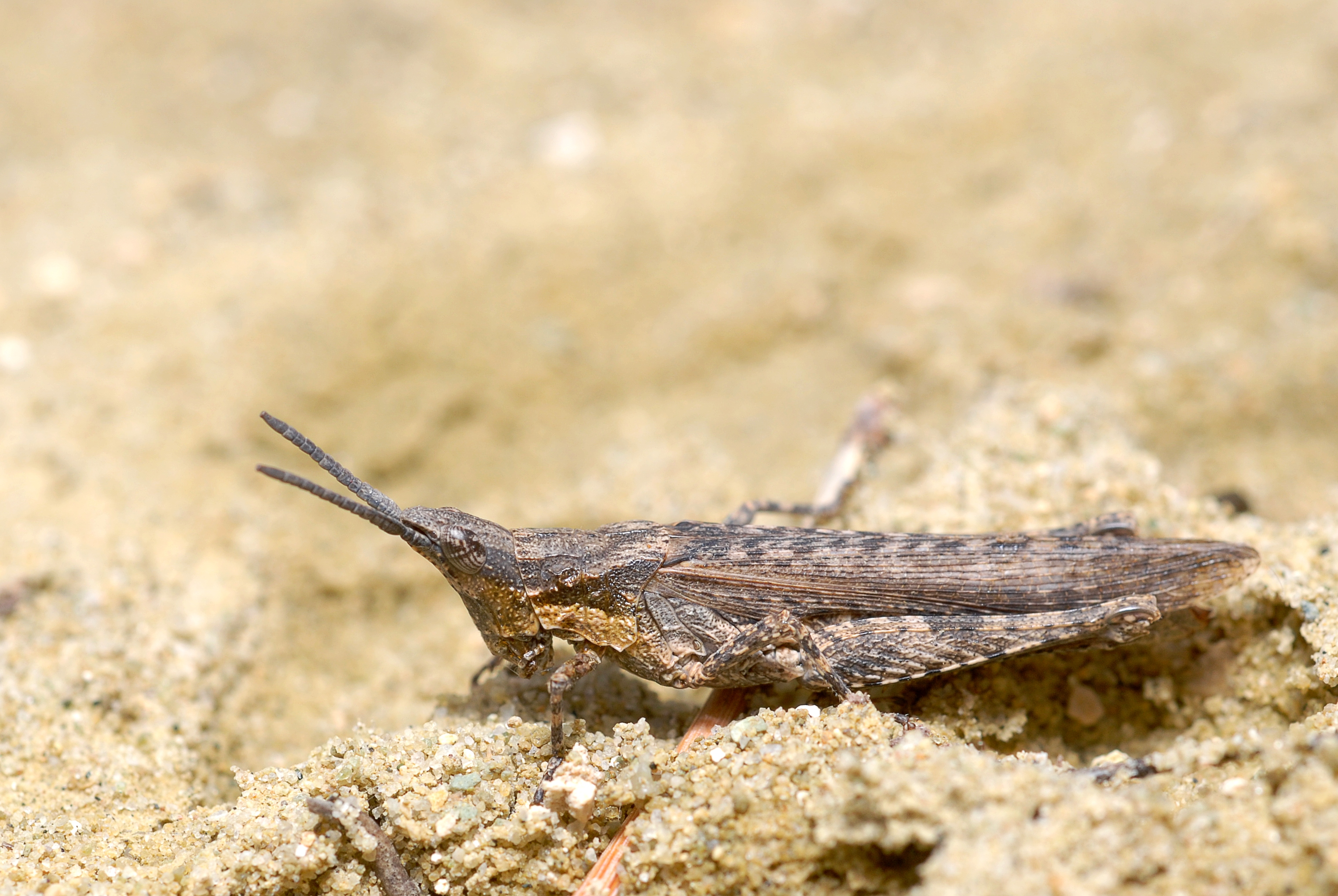
- Pyrgomorpha conica

Scientific classification
- Domain: Eukaryota
- Kingdom: Animalia
- Phylum: Arthropoda
- Class: Insecta
- Order: Orthoptera
- Suborder: Caelifera
- Family: Pyrgomorphidae
- Subfamily: Pyrgomorphinae
- Tribe: Pyrgomorphini
- Genus: Pyrgomorpha; Serville, 1838

= Pyrgomorpha =

Genus of grasshoppers

Pyrgomorpha is the type genus of grasshoppers in the family Pyrgomorphidae and the tribe Pyrgomorphini. Species are found in Southern Europe, Africa and the middle East, through to India and Mongolia.

== Species ==
The Orthoptera Species File lists the following:

subgenus Phymelloides Kevan & Akbar, 1963

1. Pyrgomorpha angolensis Bolívar, 1889
2. Pyrgomorpha granulata Stål, 1875
3. Pyrgomorpha johnseni Schmidt, 1999
4. Pyrgomorpha rugosa Key, 1937 (a.k.a. Pyrgomorpha (Phymelloides) rugosus)
5. Pyrgomorpha vignaudi Guérin-Méneville, 1849

subgenus Pyrgomorpha Serville, 1838

1. Pyrgomorpha agarena Bolívar, 1894
2. Pyrgomorpha albotaeniata Werner, 1908
3. Pyrgomorpha bispinosa Walker, 1870
4. Pyrgomorpha brachycera Kirby, 1914
5. Pyrgomorpha cognata Krauss, 1877
6. Pyrgomorpha conica Olivier, 1791 - type species (as Acrydium conicum Olivier)
7. Pyrgomorpha cypria Bolívar, 1901
8. Pyrgomorpha granosa Stål, 1876
9. Pyrgomorpha granulata Stål, 1875
10. Pyrgomorpha guentheri Burr, 1899
11. Pyrgomorpha hemiptera Uvarov, 1938
12. Pyrgomorpha inaequalipennis Bolívar, 1904
13. Pyrgomorpha lepineyi Chopard, 1943
14. Pyrgomorpha minuta Kevan, 1963
15. Pyrgomorpha tricarinata Bolívar, 1884
16. Pyrgomorpha vignaudi Guérin-Méneville, 1849
17. Pyrgomorpha vosseleri Uvarov, 1923

== Gallery ==
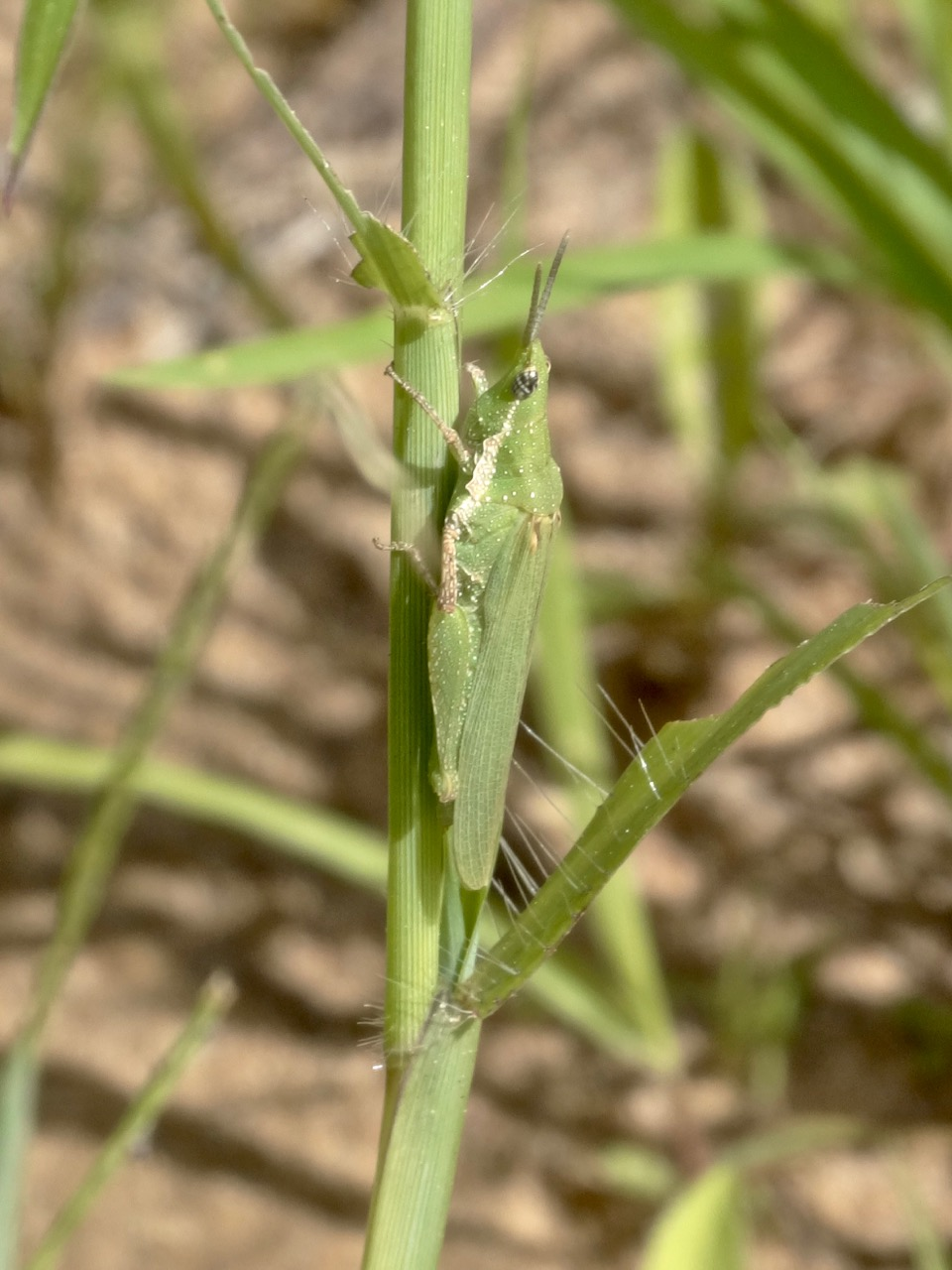
P. cognata female

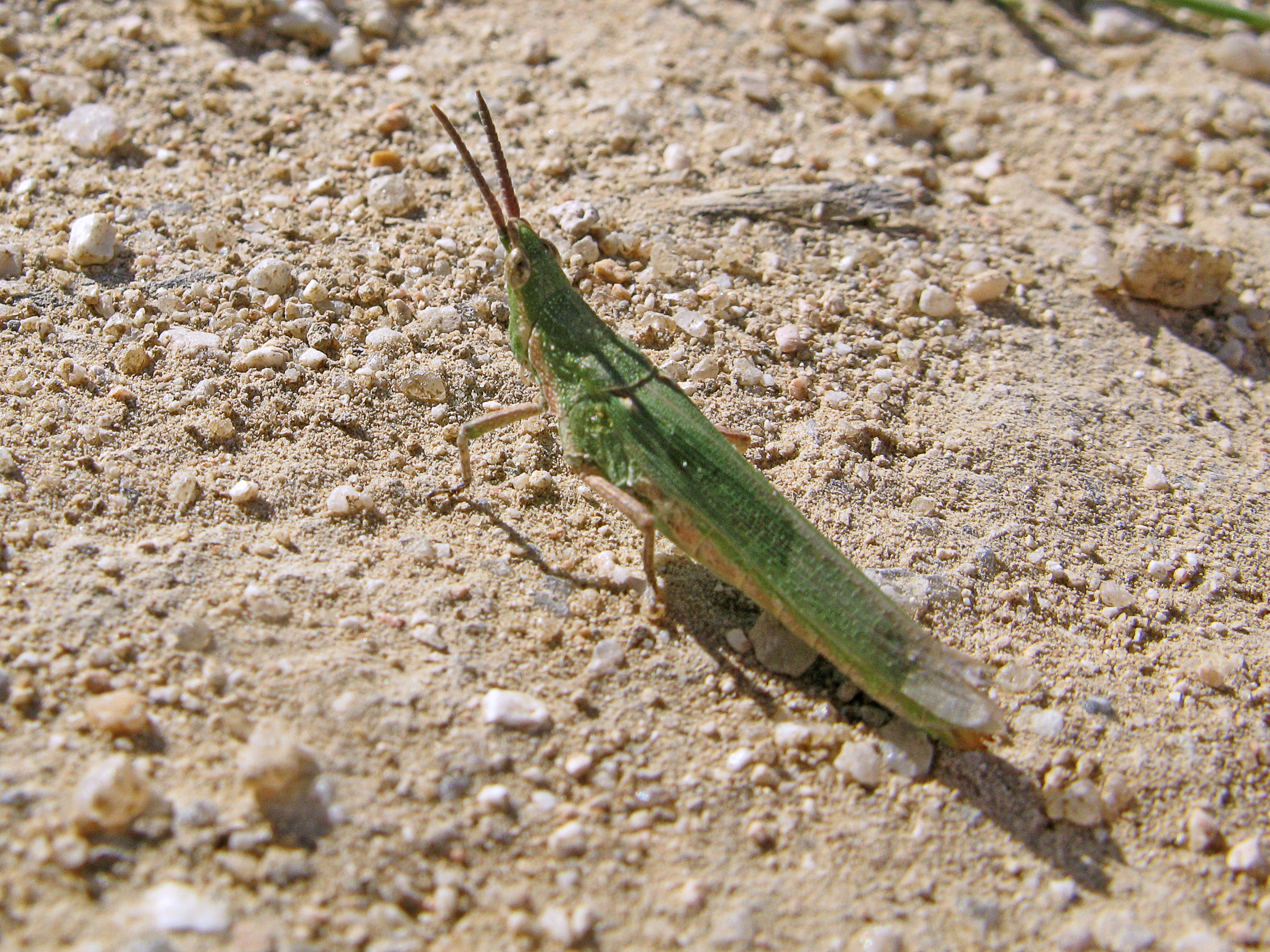
P. conica

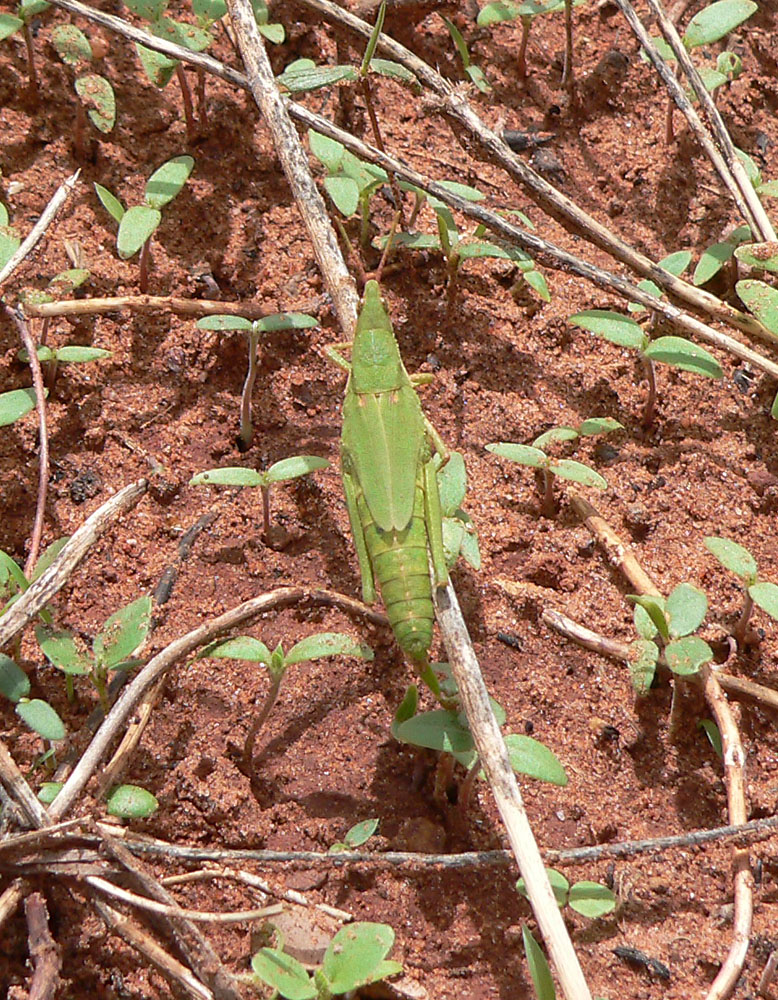
P. vignaudi female
