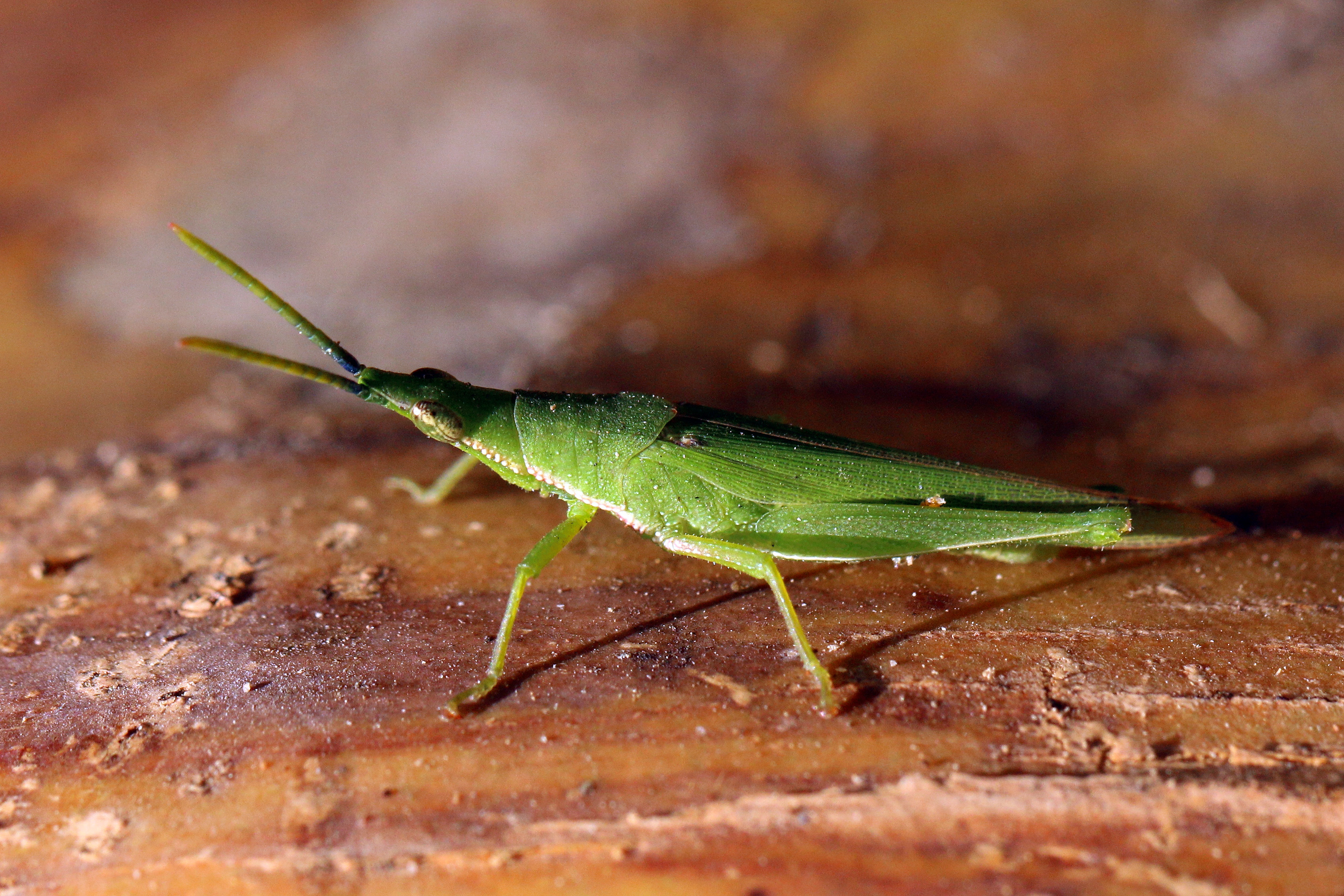
- Bali, Indonesia

Scientific classification
- Domain: Eukaryota
- Kingdom: Animalia
- Phylum: Arthropoda
- Class: Insecta
- Order: Orthoptera
- Suborder: Caelifera
- Family: Pyrgomorphidae
- Genus: Atractomorpha
- Species: A. similis

Binomial name
- Atractomorpha similis Bolívar, 1884

= Atractomorpha similis =

Species of grasshopper

Atractomorpha similis, commonly known as the northern grass pyrgomorph, is a species of grasshopper in the genus Atractomorpha. It occurs in Australia.

== Taxonomy ==
Atractomorpha similis is a member of the genus Atractomorpha, which is part of family Pyrgomorphidae. First described by Bolívar in 1884, it was long classified as a southern variant of A. crenaticeps. However, in 1960 Banerjee and Kevan distinguished it on morphological grounds. Synonyms include A. australiana and A. dentifrons.

== Description ==
Atractomorpha similis averages 40 millimetres (1.6 in) in length. The species' compact body is tapered at the head and abdomen. This grasshopper relies on camouflage to avoid predators, rarely attempting escape.

Atractomorpha similis (as with other members of its genus) is depauperate in heterochromatin, though the total amount of that DNA varies between populations. The species is highly polymorphic in its chromosomes, each of which exists in 10 to 50 morphs. Males from Australia carry between one and ten extra copies of chromosome A9, with one being the most common in natural populations.

== Range and habitat ==
Atractomorpha similis is a tropical and temperate grasshopper. It can be found in northern and eastern Australia, mostly in coastal areas, although it may be found inland if there is enough humidity. The species has been recorded in New South Wales, Fraser Island, Western Australia, and northern Queensland. It is the most common of three members of its genus found in Australia, the others being A. australis (which favours cooler environments) and A. hypoestes (which is limited to the Arnhem Land escarpment).

The species has also been found in the southern New Guinea and the Moluccas, as well as Timor. It has been reported in the Lesser Sunda Islands, although Keith McE. Kevan argues that these are most likely specimens of A. crenulata.

Atractomorpha similis is found in well-watered areas, such as gardens. It is associated with semi-permanent or permanent standing water. Populations are generally small and discrete. The species is considered a pest in Australia, because it feeds on leaves in gardens.
