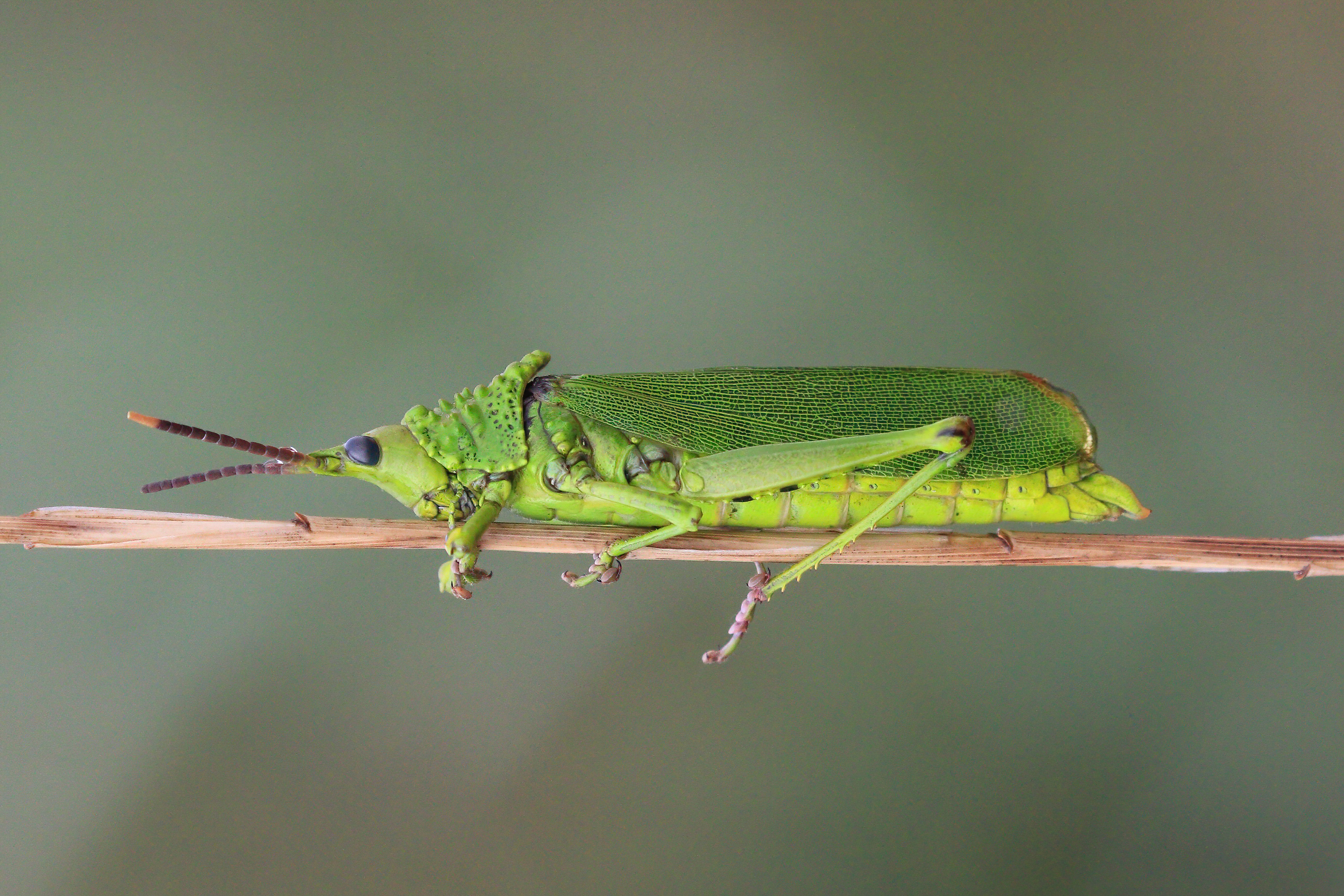
- Taphronota calliparea, Uganda

Scientific classification
- Kingdom: Animalia
- Phylum: Arthropoda
- Clade: Pancrustacea
- Class: Insecta
- Order: Orthoptera
- Suborder: Caelifera
- Family: Pyrgomorphidae
- Subfamily: Pyrgomorphinae; Brunner von Wattenwyl, 1874

= Pyrgomorphinae =

Subfamily of grasshoppers

The Pyrgomorphinae are a subfamily of grasshoppers (Orthoptera : Caelifera) in the family Pyrgomorphidae. Species are found in, predominantly in the warmer regions of: Central and South America, southern Europe, Africa, Asia, Australia and Pacific Islands. The type genus is Pyrgomorpha and names dates from "Pyrgomorphiden" by Brunner von Wattenwyl, 1874. The first use of Pyrgomorphinae was by Krauss in 1890.

== Tribes and genera ==
The Orthoptera Species File lists the following:

=== Atractomorphini ===
Bolívar, 1905

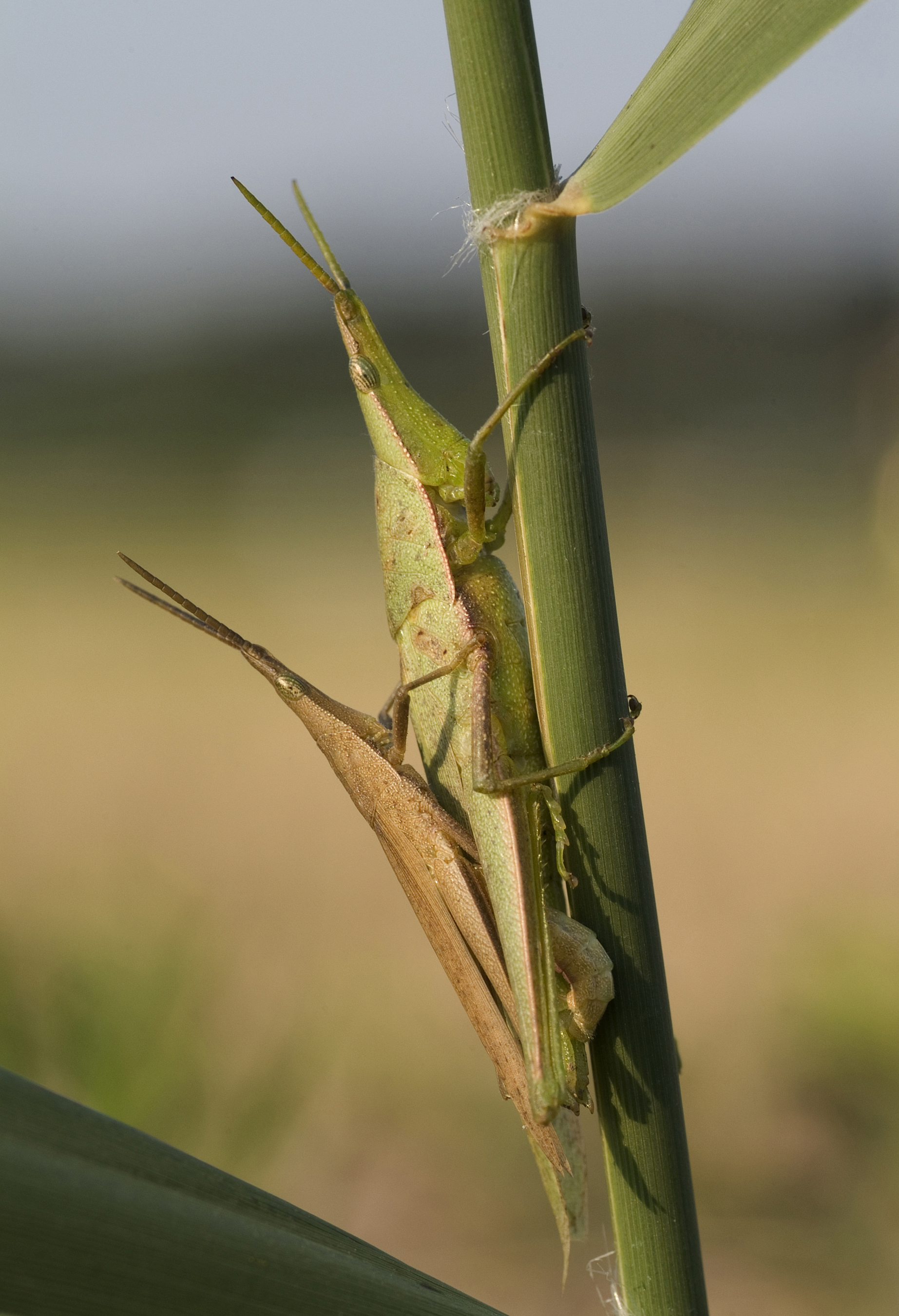
Atractomorpha lata

1. Atractomorpha Saussure, 1862 - Asia, Australia
2. Occidentosphena Kevan, 1956 - Africa
  1. Occidentosphena ruandensis
  2. Occidentosphena uvarovi

=== Chlorizeinini ===
Kevan & Akbar, 1964; Distribution: Africa, Asia

- Subtribe Chlorizeinina Kevan & Akbar, 1964
1. Chlorizeina Brunner von Wattenwyl, 1893
2. Feacris Kevan, 1969
3. Pterorthacris Uvarov, 1921
- Subtribe Humpatellina Kevan & Akbar, 1964
1. Cawendia Karsch, 1888
2. Humpatella Karsch, 1896
3. Pseudorubellia Dirsh, 1963
- Subtribe Marsabitacridina Kevan & Akbar, 1964
1. Katangacris Kevan & Akbar, 1964
2. Marsabitacris Kevan, 1957

=== Chrotogonini ===
Bolívar, 1904; Distribution: Africa to central Asia

1. Caconda Bolívar, 1884
2. Chrotogonus Serville, 1838
3. Micropterellus Braun, 2024
4. Shoacris Kevan, 1952
5. Stibarosterna Uvarov, 1953
6. Tenuitarsus Bolívar, 1904

=== Desmopterini ===
Bolívar, 1905; Distribution: SE Asia, Australia

1. Apodesmoptera Rehn, 1951
2. Desmoptera Bolívar, 1884
  1. Desmoptera truncatipennis
3. Desmopterella Ramme, 1941
4. Doriaella Bolívar, 1898
5. Menesesia Willemse, 1922
6. Menesesiella Kevan, 1963
7. Paradoriaella Willemse, 1961
8. Stenoxyphellus Ramme, 1941
9. Stenoxyphula Kevan, 1963
10. Stenoxyphus Blanchard, 1853

=== Dictyophorini ===
Kirby, 1902; Distribution: Africa

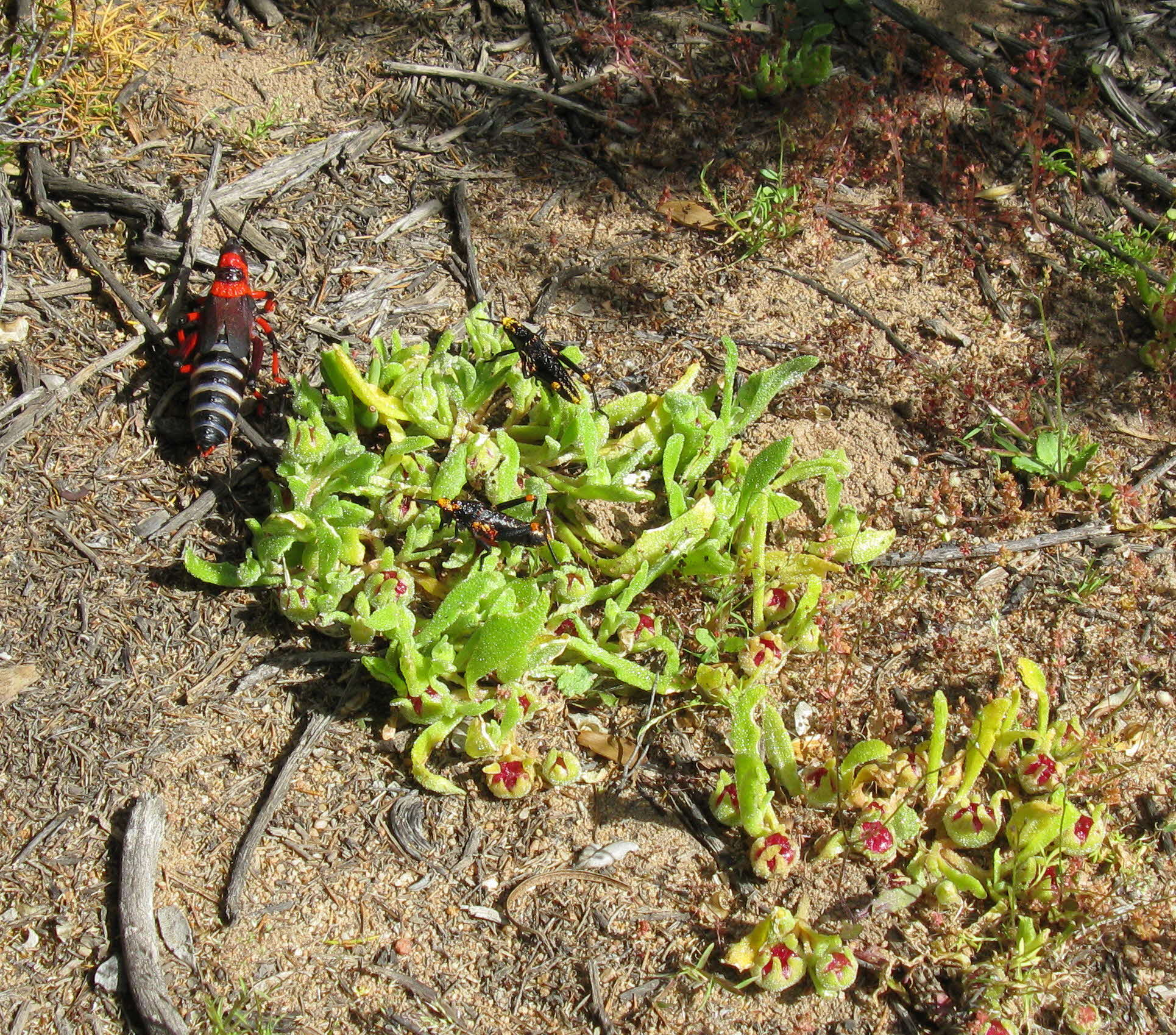
Mature and immature Dictyophorus spumans photographed in the Cedarberg in South Africa

1. Camoensia
2. Dictyophorus: including Dictyophorus spumans
3. Loveridgacris
4. Maura
5. Parapetasia

=== Monistriini ===
Kevan & Akbar, 1964; Distribution: Australia

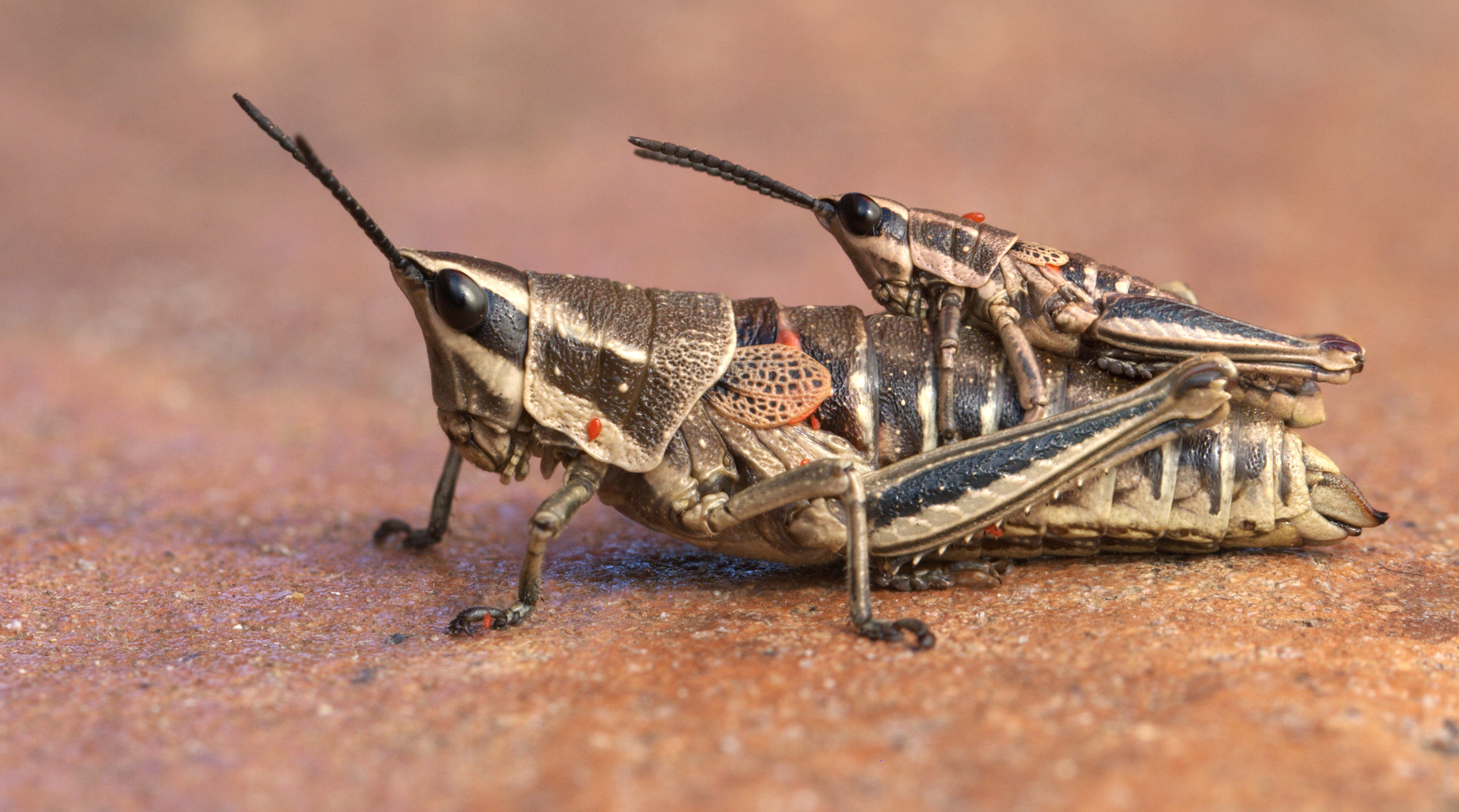
Monistria concinna

1. Greyacris
  1. Greyacris profundesulcata
2. Monistria
3. Parastria
  1. Parastria reticulata
4. Pileolum
  1. Pileolum kirbyi
5. Yeelanna
  1. Yeelanna argus
  2. Yeelanna pavonina

=== Omurini ===
Kevan, 1961; Distribution: South America

1. Algete Bolívar, 1905
2. Minorissa Walker, 1870
3. Omura Walker, 1870

=== Petasidini ===
Key, 1985; Distribution: Australia

1. Petasida: monotypic P. ephippigera (Leichhardt's grasshopper)
2. Scutillya: monotypic S. verrucosa (Giant spotted pyrgomorph)

=== Phymateini ===
Bolívar, 1884; Distribution: Africa (incl. Madagascar), China

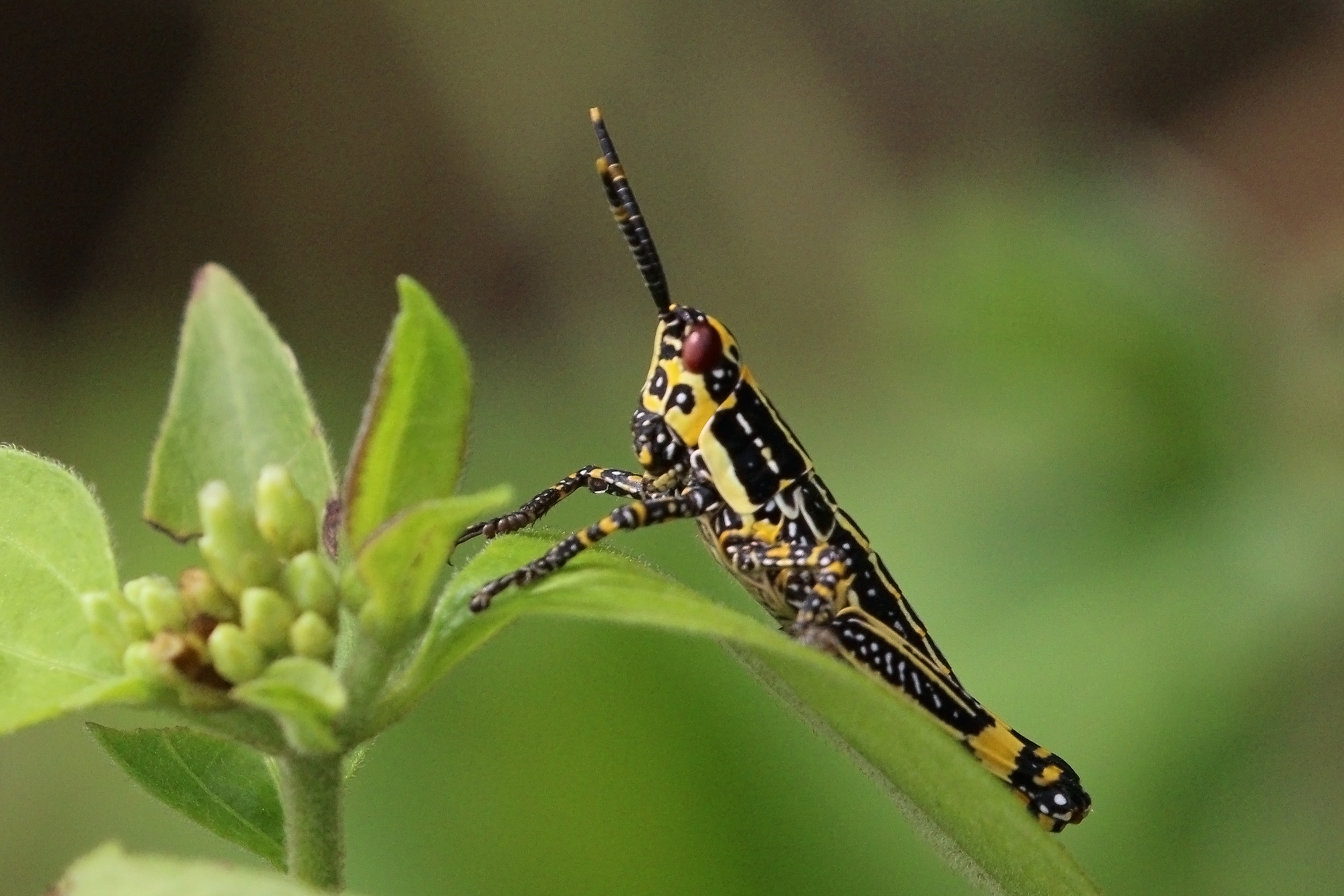
Variegated grasshopper (Zonocerus variegatus) nymph, Ghana

1. Paraphymateus
2. Phymateus
3. Physemophorus
4. Phyteumas
5. Rutidoderes
6. Zonocerus

=== Poekilocerini ===
Burmeister, 1840; Distribution: Africa, India, Indo-China, Malesia, PNG

1. Poekilocerus Serville, 1831

=== Psednurini ===
Burr, 1904; Distribution: Australia

1. Propsednura
  1. Propsednura eyrei
  2. Propsednura peninsularis
2. Psedna
  1. Psedna nana
3. Psednura
  1. Psednura longicornis
  2. Psednura musgravei
  3. Psednura pedestris

=== Pseudomorphacridini ===
Kevan & Akbar, 1964; Distribution: Indo-China

1. Pseudomorphacris Carl, 1916

=== Pyrgomorphini ===
Brunner von Wattenwyl, 1874; distribution: Africa, Southern Europe, W. Asia through to Indochina

subtribe Arbusculina Kevan, Akbar & Chang, 1975 (Cambodia)

1. Arbuscula Bolívar, 1905 monotypic Arbuscula cambodjiana Bolívar, 1905

subtribe Geloiodina Kevan, Akbar & Chang, 1975 (W African islands)

1. Geloiodes Chopard, 1958

subtribe Parasphenina Kevan & Akbar, 1964 (Africa)

1. Afrosphena Kevan, 1956
2. Afrosphenella Kevan & Akbar, 1963
3. Chirindites Ramme, 1929
4. Parasphena Bolívar, 1884
5. Parasphenella Kevan, 1956
6. Parasphenula Kevan, 1956
7. Pezotagasta Uvarov, 1953
8. Stenoscepa Karsch, 1896

subtribe Pyrgomorphina Brunner von Wattenwyl, 1874

1. Anarchita Bolívar, 1904
2. Carinisphena Kevan, 1966
3. Laufferia Bolívar, 1904
4. Leptea Bolívar, 1904
5. Macroleptea Kevan, 1962
6. †Miopyrgomorpha Kevan, 1964
7. Ochrophlebia Stål, 1873
8. Ochrophlegma Bolívar, 1904
9. Phymella Uvarov, 1922
10. Plerisca Bolívar, 1904
11. Protanita Kevan, 1962
12. Punctisphena Kevan, 1961
13. Pyrgomorpha Serville, 1838
14. Pyrgomorphella Bolívar, 1904
15. Pyrgomorphellula Kevan & Hsiung, 1988
16. Pyrgomorphula Kevan & Akbar, 1963
17. Scabropyrgus Kevan, 1962
18. Somalopyrgus Kevan & Akbar, 1964
19. Tanita Bolívar, 1904
20. Tanitella Kevan, 1962
21. Zarytes Bolívar, 1904

=== Schulthessiini ===
Kevan & Akbar, 1964; Distribution: Madagascar

1. Buyssoniella Bolívar, 1905
2. Schulthessia Bolívar, 1905

=== Sphenariini ===
Bolívar, 1884 - Central America, Africa, China

- Subtribe Mekongianina Kevan & Akbar, 1964
1. Mekongiana Uvarov, 1940
2. Mekongiella Kevan, 1966
3. Yunnanites Uvarov, 1925
- Subtribe Rubelliina Kevan & Akbar, 1964
1. Rubellia Stål, 1875
- Subtribe Sphenariina Bolívar, 1884
1. Jaragua Perez-Gelabert, Dominici & Hierro, 1995
2. Prosphena Bolívar, 1884
3. Sphenarium Charpentier, 1845
- Subtribe Sphenexiina Kevan & Akbar, 1964
1. Sphenexia Karsch, 1896
2. Xenephias Kevan, 1973

=== Tagastini ===
Bolívar, 1905; Distribution: SE Asia

1. Annandalea Bolívar, 1905
2. Tagasta Bolívar, 1905

=== Taphronotini ===
Bolívar, 1904; Distribution: Africa, India, Indo-China

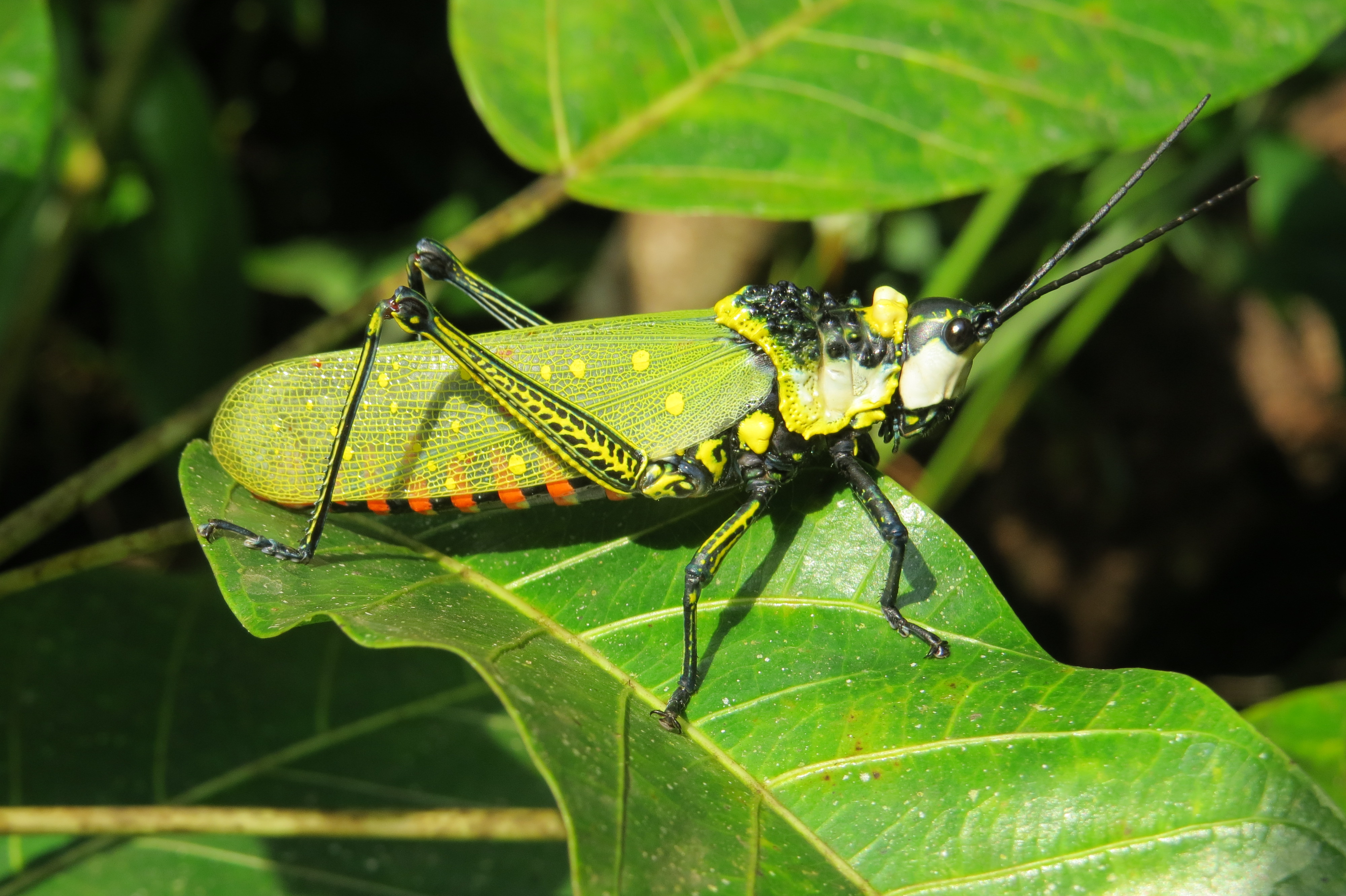
Aularches miliaris

1. Aularches Stål, 1873; monotypic: A. miliaris
2. Taphronota Stål, 1873

=== Tribe not assigned ===
All genera are monotypic:

- Eilenbergia: E. sagitta Mason, 1979
- Megalopyrga: M. monochroma Baccetti, 1985
- Paramekongiella: P. zhongdianensis Huang, 1990
- Xiphipyrgus: X. tunstalli Kevan, 1982
