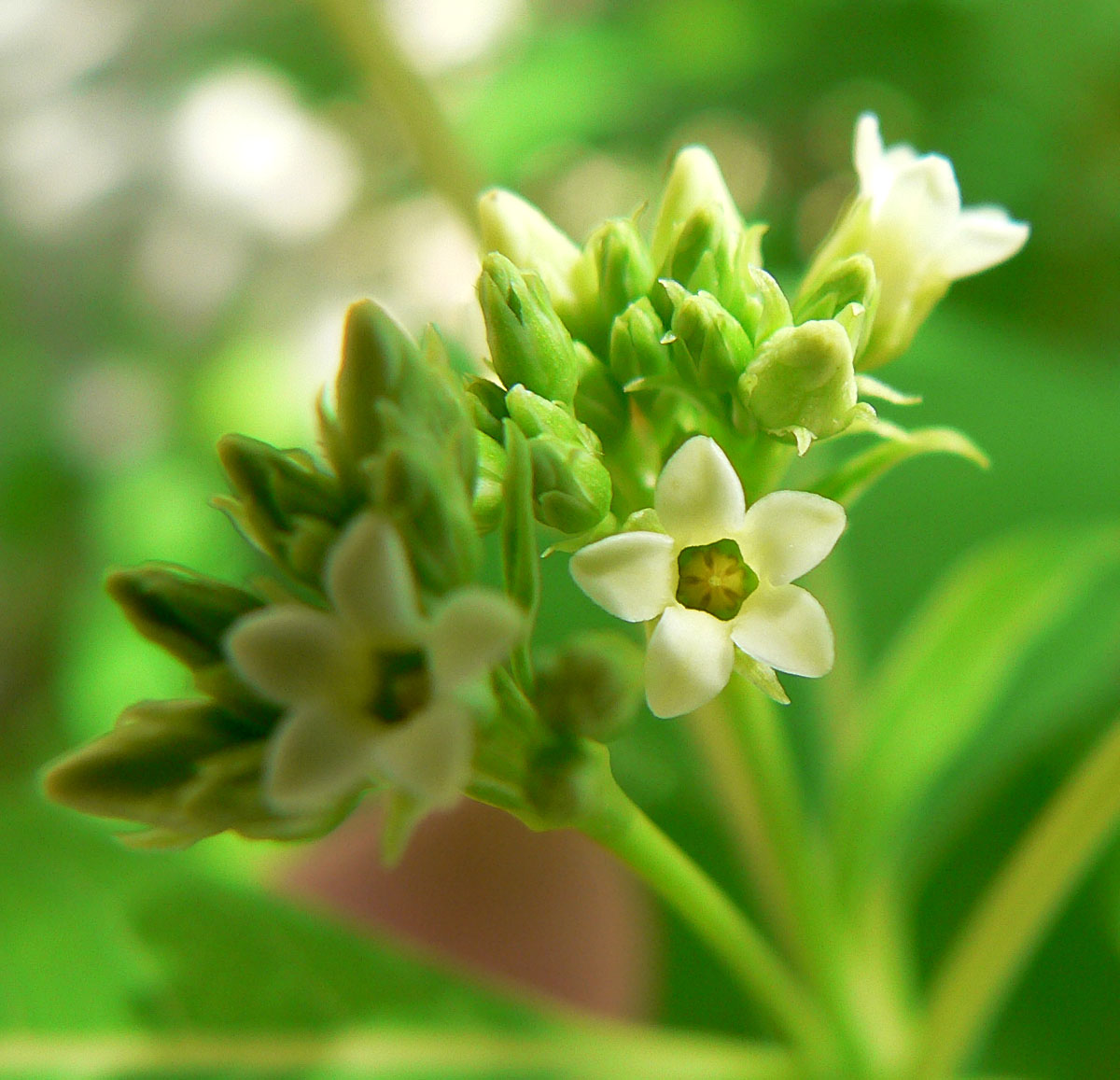
- Apocynum cannabinum

Scientific classification
- Kingdom: Plantae
- Clade: Tracheophytes
- Clade: Angiosperms
- Clade: Eudicots
- Clade: Asterids
- Order: Gentianales
- Family: Apocynaceae; Juss.

Type genus
- Apocynum L.

Synonyms
- Asclepiadaceae Borkh. (nom. cons.); Periplocaceae Schltr. (nom. cons.); Plumeriaceae Horan.; Stapeliaceae Horan.; Vincaceae Vest; Willughbeiaceae J. Agardh

= Apocynaceae =

Dogbane and oleander family of flowering plants

Apocynaceae (/əˌpɑːsəˈneɪsiˌaɪ, -siːˌiː/, from Apocynum, literally "away-dog" in Greek, i.e. "[that which takes] away [the life of a] dog") is a family of flowering plants that includes trees, shrubs, herbs, stem succulents, and vines, commonly known as the dogbane family, because some taxa were used as dog poison. Notable members of the family include oleander, dogbanes, milkweeds, wax plants and periwinkles. The family is native to the European, Asian, African, Australian, and American tropics or subtropics, with some temperate members as well. The former family Asclepiadaceae (now known as Asclepiadoideae) is considered a subfamily of Apocynaceae and contains 348 genera. A list of Apocynaceae genera may be found here.

Many species are tall trees found in tropical forests, but some grow in tropical dry (xeric) environments. Perennial herbs also occur in temperate zones. Many of these plants have milky latex, and many species are poisonous if ingested, the family being rich in genera containing alkaloids and cardiac glycosides, those containing the latter often finding use as arrow poisons. Some genera of Apocynaceae, such as Adenium, bleed clear sap without latex when damaged, and others, such as Pachypodium, have milky latex apart from their sap.

== Description ==
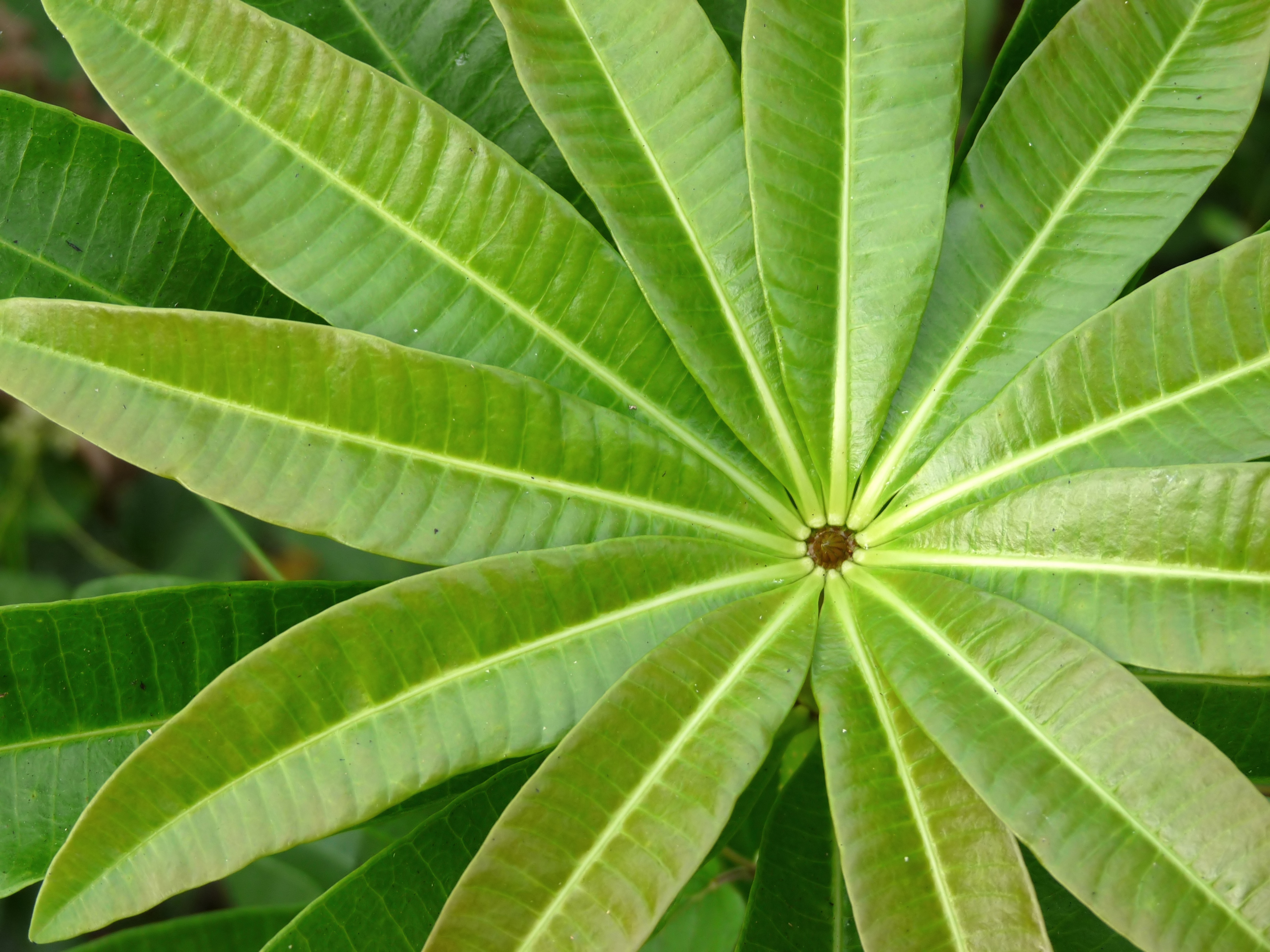
Alstonia scholaris, arrangement of leaves

=== Growth pattern ===
The dogbane family is morphologically diverse, with the highest diversity of forms in tropical and subtropical regions, and includes annual plants, perennial herbs, stem succulents, woody shrubs, trees, or vines. Most exude a milky latex when cut.

=== Leaves and stems ===
Leaves are simple. They may appear one at a time (singly) with each occurrence on alternating sides of the stem, but usually occur in pairs (and rarely in whorls). When paired, they occur on opposite sides of the stem (opposite), with each pair occurring at an angle rotated 90° to the pair below it (decussate).

There is no stipule (a small leaf-like structure at the base of the leaf stem), or stipules are small and sometimes finger-like.

=== Inflorescence and fruit ===
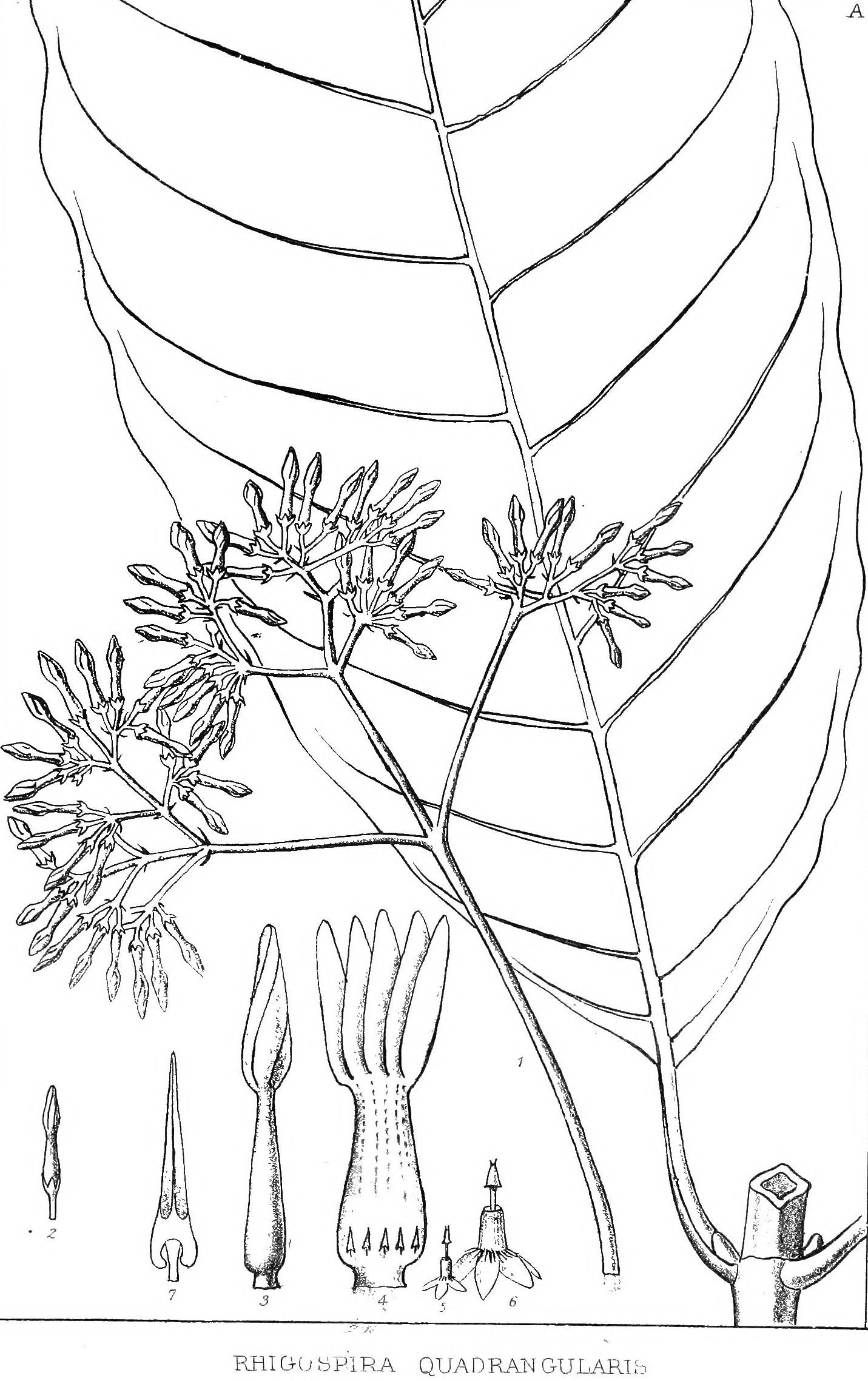
Rhigospira quadrangularis, portion of a plant. 1) the inflorescence and 2) a flower, to scale; 3) corolla in bud, showing the pyramidal form of the erect segments in aestivation and 4) the same cut open when expanded, showing their simple sinistrorse convolution and the nearly basal position of the stamens, both magnified; 5) the calyx, disk, very short style, clavuncle, and stigmata, to scale; 6) the same, magnified; 7) a stamen, much magnified.

Flowers of the Apocynaceae are complex and highly derived. Flowers have radial symmetry (actinomorphic), and are borne in heads that are cymes or racemes, or are solitary in axils. They are perfect (bisexual), with a synsepalous, five-lobed calyx united into a tube at the base. Inflorescences are terminal or axillary. Five petals are united into a tube with four or five epipetalous stamens. The style head is swollen. The pollen is transported in foam. The ovary is usually superior, bicarpellary, and apocarpous, with a common fused style and stigma. (Fig. 5. and Fig.6. in the illustration of Rhigospira quadrangularis show a typical tripartite style which divides into three zones (specialised for pollen deposition, viscin secretion, and the reception of pollen).

The fruit is a drupe, a berry, a capsule, or a (frequently paired) follicle. The seeds are often winged or have appendages of long silky hairs.

== Taxonomy ==
As of 2012, the family was described as comprising some 5,100 species, in five subfamilies:

- Apocynoideae Burnett, 1835
- Asclepiadoideae Burnett, 1835 (incorporating the Asclepiadaceae)
- Periplocoideae Endl., 1838
- Rauvolfioideae Kostel., 1834
- Secamonoideae Endl., 1838

The former family Asclepiadaceae is included in Apocynaceae according to the Angiosperm Phylogeny Group III (APG III) modern, largely molecular-based system of flowering plant taxonomy. An updated classification, including 366 genera, 25 tribes, and 49 subtribes, was published in 2014.

376 genera are currently accepted.

== Distribution and habitat ==
Species in this family are distributed mainly in tropical regions:

- In the tropical forests and swamps of Indomalaya: small to very tall evergreen trees up to 80 m (260 ft) tall, often with buttress roots, such as Alstonia and Dyera.
- In Australia: occurs in all habitats; about 46 genera and about 200 species, including about 20 naturalised; herbs, vines, shrubs and trees.
- In deciduous forests of Africa, India, and Indo-China: smaller trees such as Carissa, Wrightia, and Holarrhena
- In tropical America, India, Myanmar, and Malaya: evergreen trees and shrubs, such as Rauvolfia, Tabernaemontana, and Acokanthera.
- In Central America: Plumeria, or the frangipani, with its waxy white or pink flowers and a sweet scent.
- In South America, Africa, and Madagascar: many lianas, such as Landolphia
- In the Mediterranean region: Nerium, with the well-known oleander or be-still tree (Nerium oleander), and Apple of Sodom (Calotropis procera), with other (Calotropis) species extending into South Asia.
- The only genera found in temperate Europe away from the Mediterranean are Vinca (Rauvolfioideae) and Vincetoxicum (Asclepiadoideae). Also Asclepias syriaca is an invasive weed (e. g., in many areas of Ukraine).
- In North America: Apocynum, dogbane or Indian hemp, including Apocynum cannabinum, a traditional source of fiber. Also the bluestars, Amsonia, herbaceous perennials of upright habit, grown as ornamental plants for their attractive flowers.
- In continental southern Africa (Angola, Botswana, Eswatini, Mozambique, South Africa, and Zimbabwe) and Madagascar, except for the humid evergreen forest of the eastern side of Madagascar, and never above 2,000 m (6,600 ft) for the entire island: Pachypodium and Fockea.

== Ecology ==
Several genera are preferred larval host plants for the Queen Butterfly (Danaus gilippus).

== Toxicity ==
Many species of plants from the family Apocynaceae have some toxicity, with some being extremely poisonous if parts are ingested, or if they are not handled properly. Genera containing cardiac glycosides—Cerbera, Nerium, Asclepias, Cascabela, Strophanthus, Acokanthera, Apocynum, Thevetia, etc.—have therapeutic ranges, but are often associated with accidental poisonings, in many cases lethal (see below). Alkaloid-producing species like Rauvolfia serpentina, Catharanthus roseus, and Tabernanthe iboga are likewise the source of compounds with therapeutic ranges, but which have significant associated toxicities if not taken in appropriate doses and in controlled fashion. (See below)

== Uses ==
Several members of the family Apocynaceae have had economic uses in the past. Several are sources of important natural products—pharmacologic tool compounds and drug research candidates, and in some cases actual prescription drugs. Cardiac glycosides, which affect heart function, are a ready example. Genera studied and known to contain such glycosides include Acokanthera, Apocynum, Cerbera, Nerium, Thevetia and Strophanthus. Rauvolfia serpentina (Indian snakeroot) contains the alkaloid reserpine, which has been used as an antihypertensive and an antipsychotic drug but its adverse effects limit its clinical use. Catharanthus roseus yields alkaloids used in the treatment of cancer. Tabernanthe iboga, Voacanga africana, and Tabernaemontana undulata contain the alkaloid ibogaine, which is a psychedelic drug which may help with drug addiction, but which has significant adverse effects, with ibogaine being both cardiotoxic and neurotoxic. Ajmalicine, an alkaloid found in Rauvolfia spp., Catharanthus roseus, and Mitragyna speciosa, is an antihypertensive drug used in the treatment of high blood pressure.

Many genera are grown as ornamental plants, including Amsonia (bluestar), Nerium (oleander), Vinca (periwinkle), Carissa (Natal plum), Allamanda (golden trumpet), Plumeria (frangipani), Thevetia, Mandevilla (Savannah flower), and Adenium (desert-rose).

In addition, the genera Landolphia, Carpodinus, and Mascarenhasia have been used as commercial sources of inferior rubber. (See Congo rubber)

There are limited dietary uses of plants from this family. The flower of Echites panduratus (common name: loroco) is edible. Carissa (Natal plum) produces an edible fruit, but all other parts of the plant are poisonous. The genus Apocynum was reportedly used as a source of fiber by Native Americans. The aromatic fruit juice from Saba comorensis (syn. Landolphia comorensis, the Bungo or Mbungo fruit) is used as a drink.

Finally, ethnopharmacologic and ethnotoxicologic uses are also known. The roots of Tabernanthe iboga and certain Voacanga species have traditionally been used ceremonially as hallucinogens in Africa. The ibogaine-type alkaloids responsible for the psychoactivity of these plants have been studied with regard to the treatment of drug addiction. The juice of Acokanthera species such as A. venenata and the milky juice of the Namibian Pachypodium have been used as poison for arrow tips.

Many species are ornamental in gardens or as houseplants.

== Gallery ==
=== Flowers ===
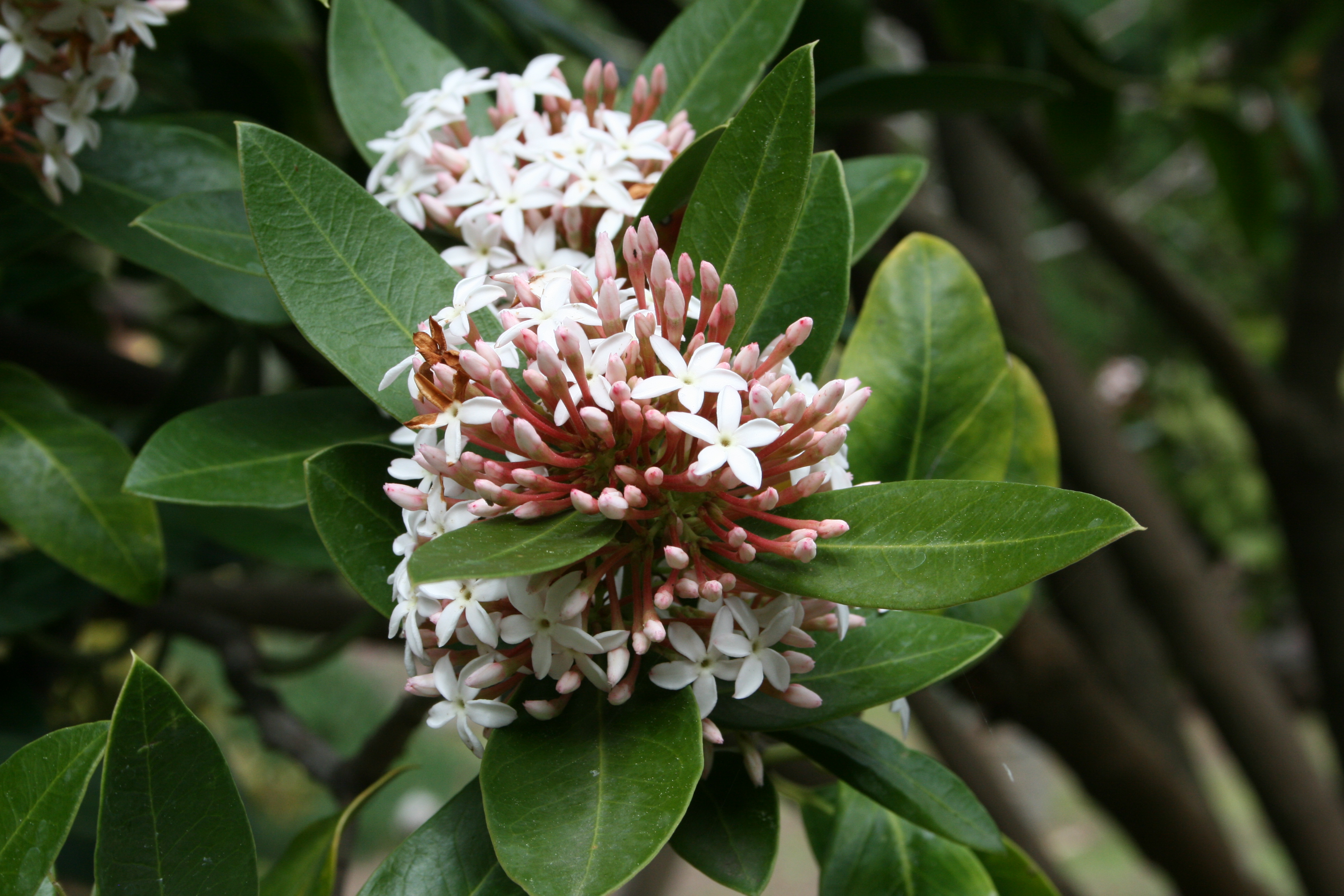
Acokanthera oblongifolia

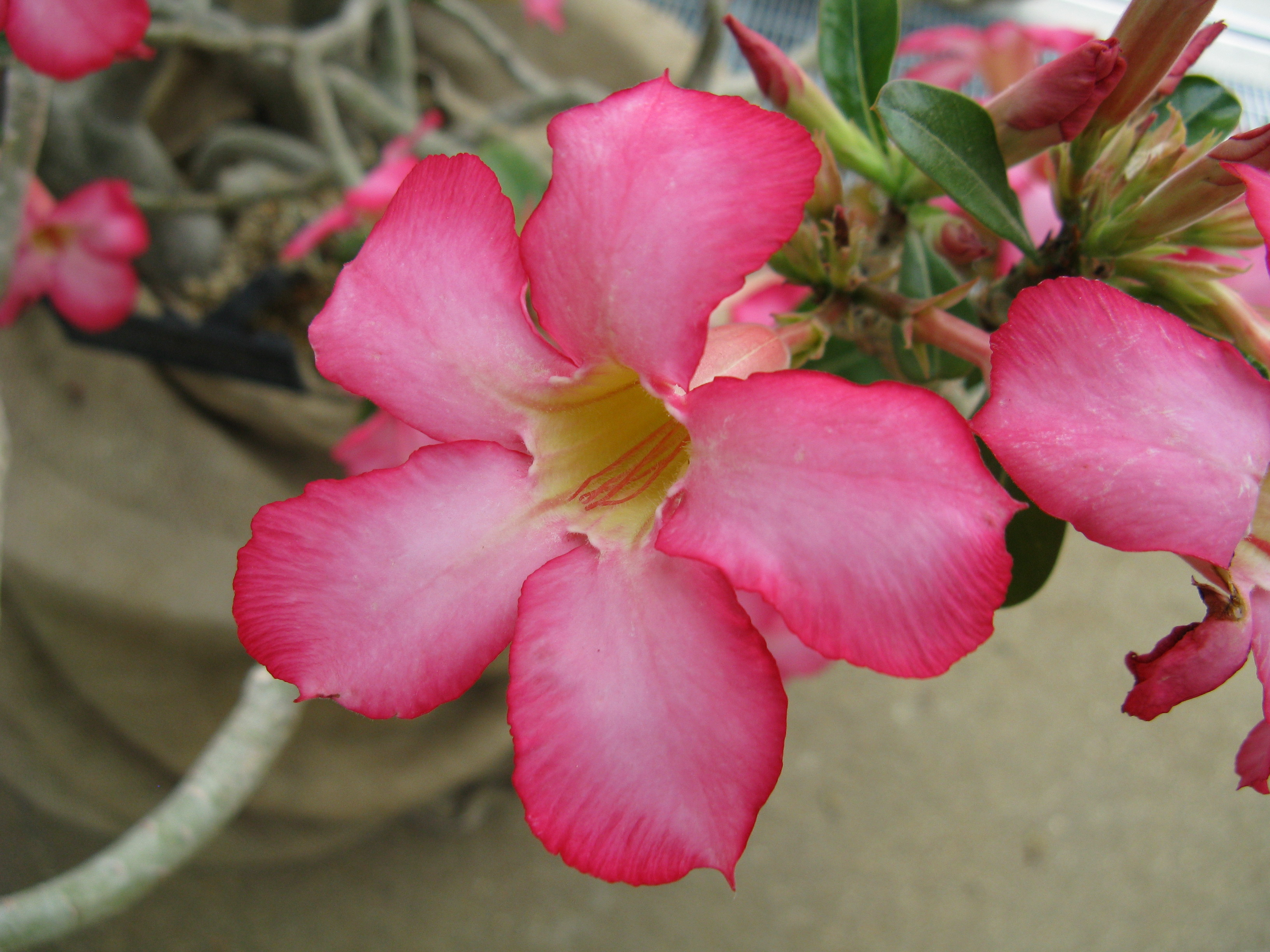
Adenium obesum

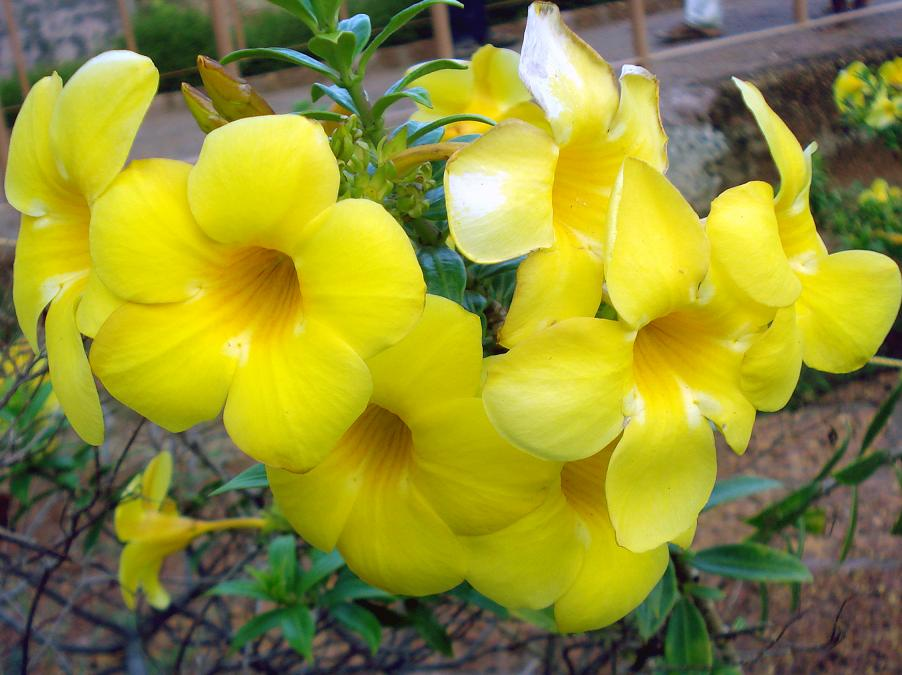
Allamanda cathartica

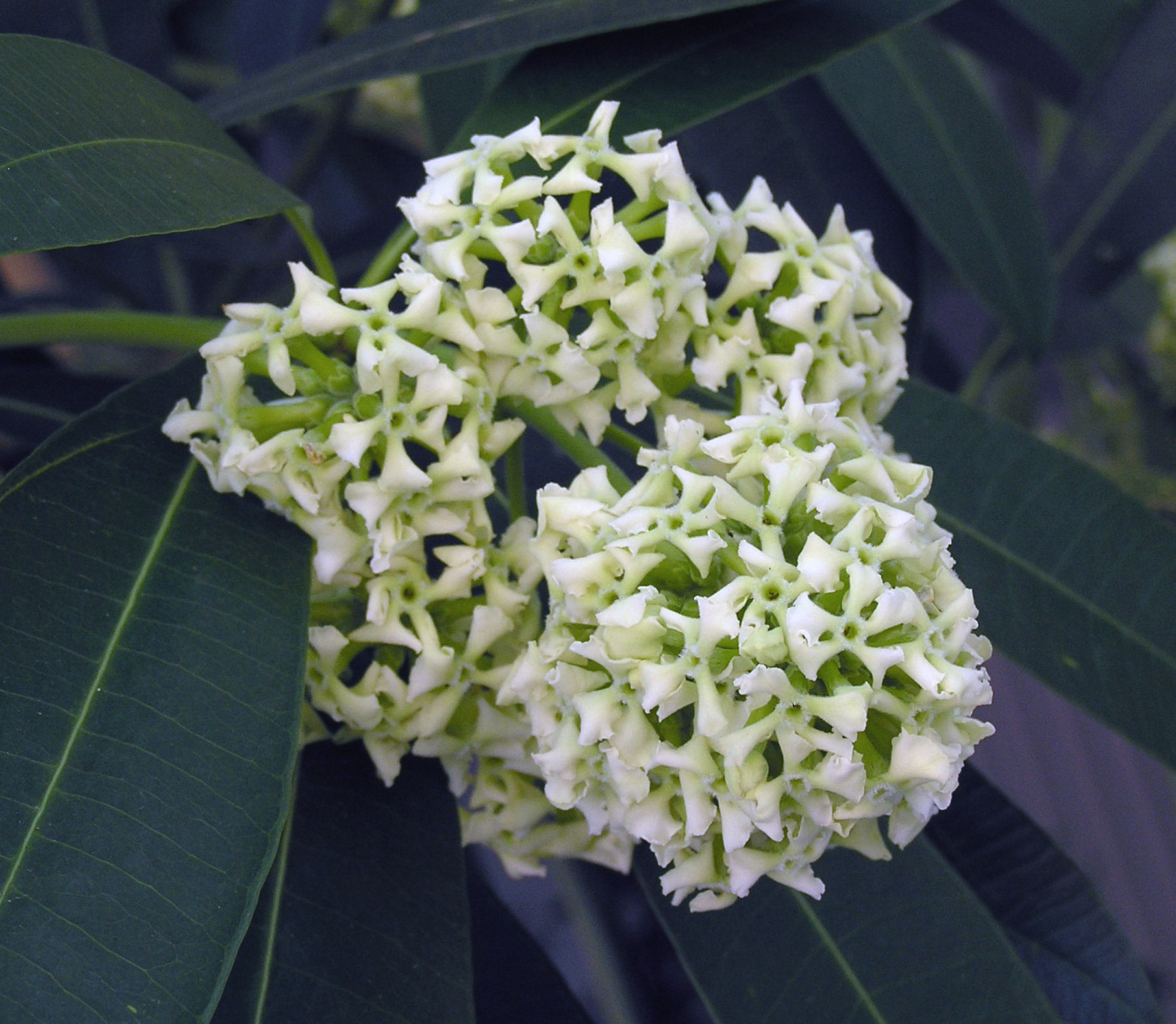
Alstonia scholaris

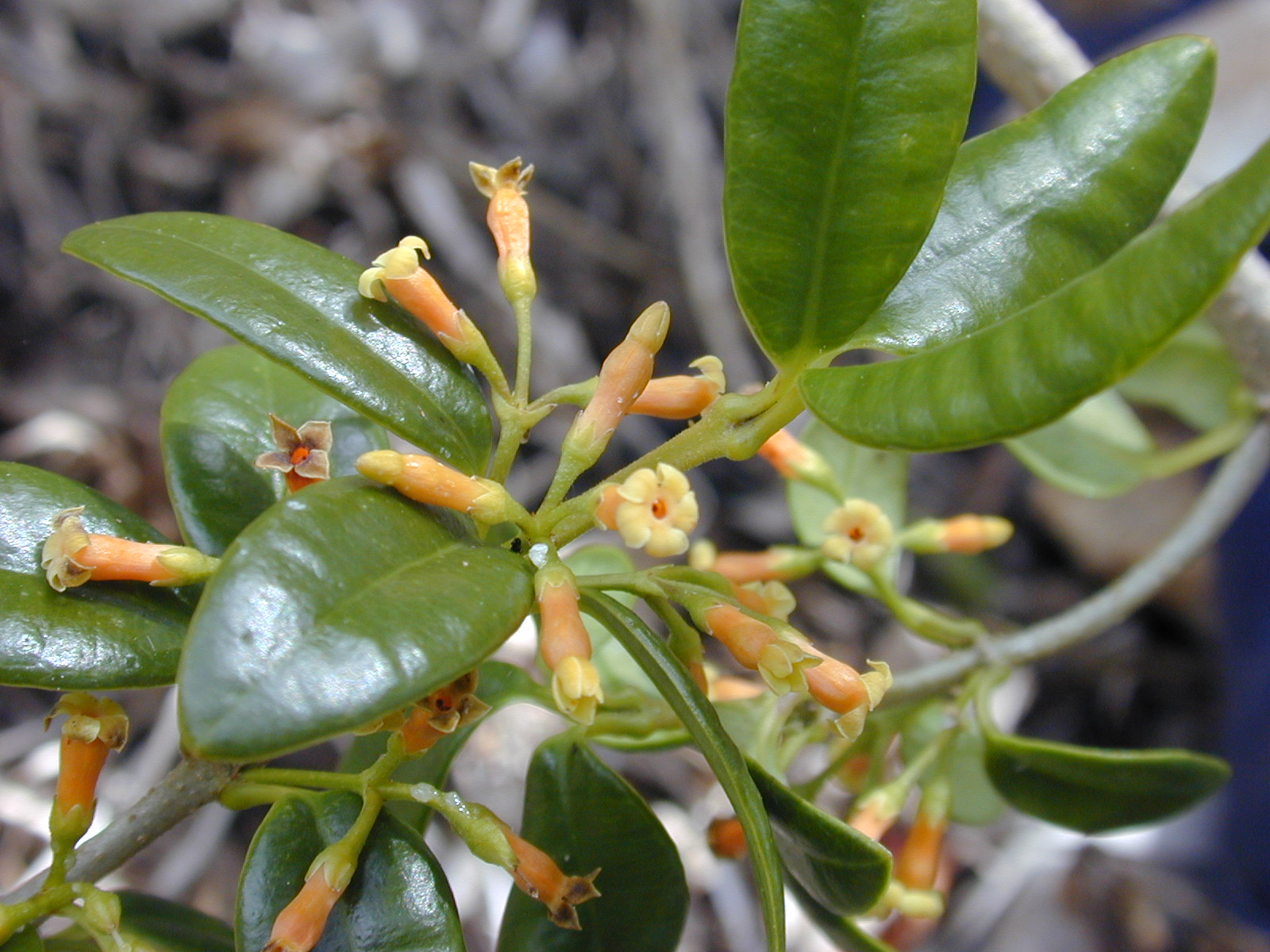
Alyxia oliviformis

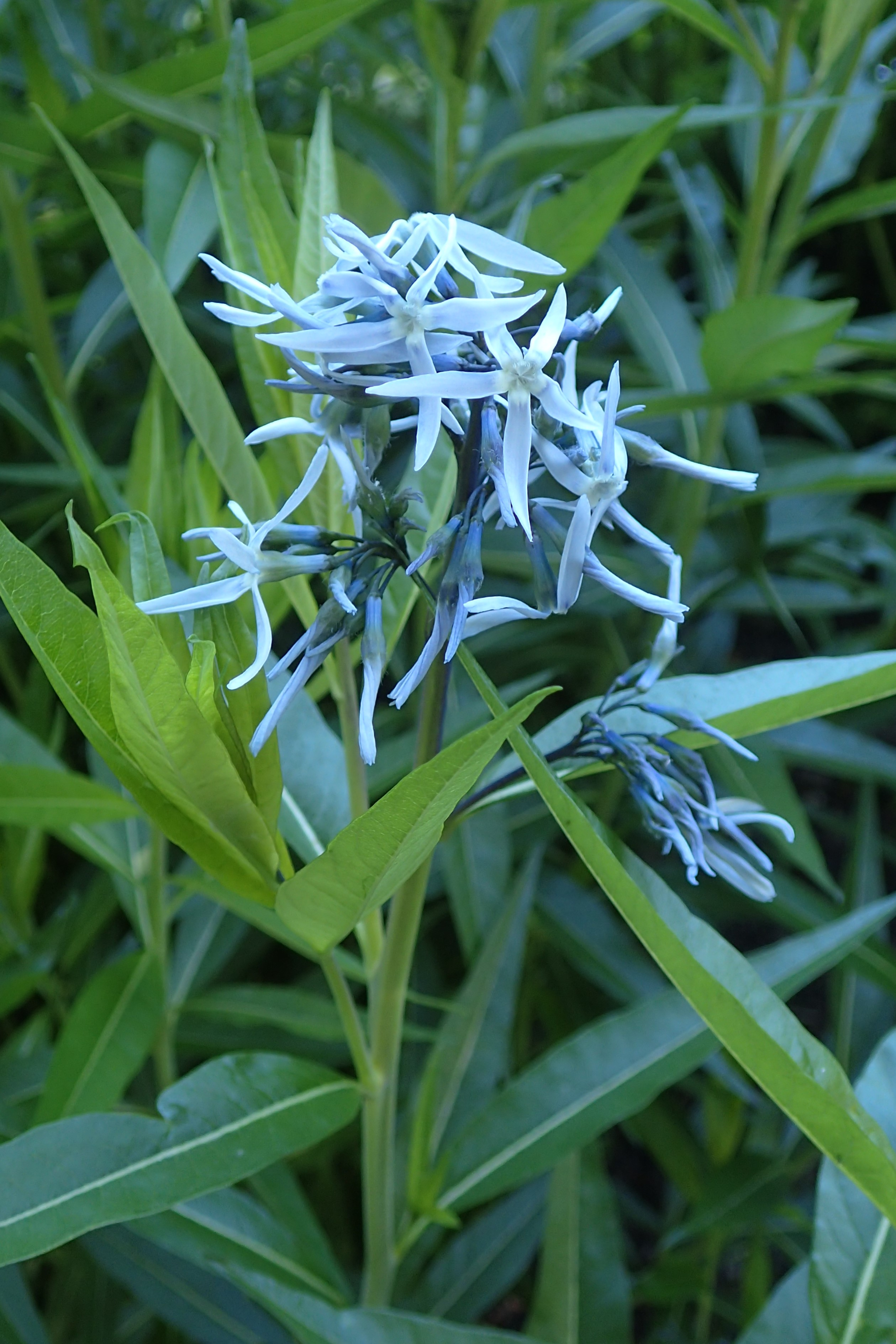
Amsonia tabernaemontana

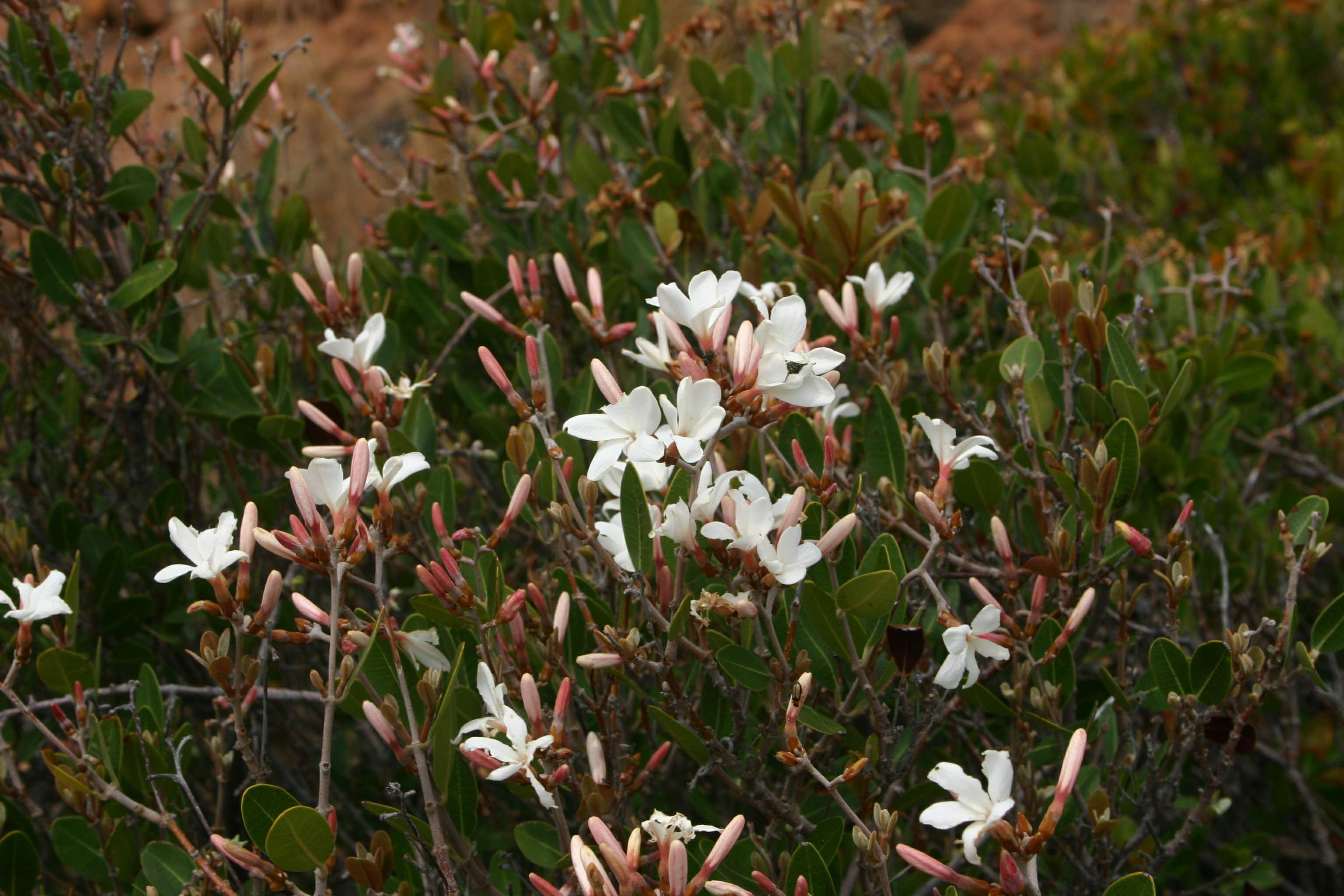
Ancylobothrys capensis

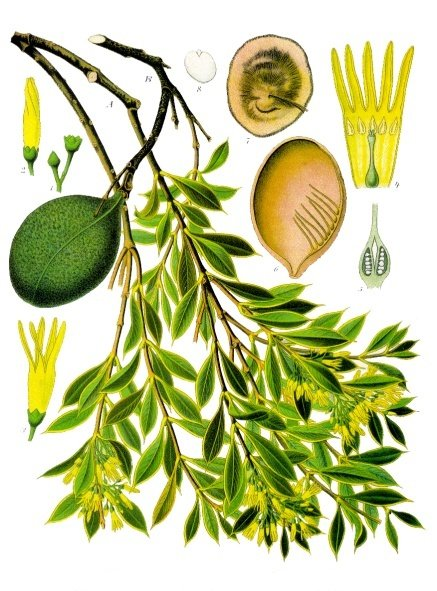
Aspidosperma quebracho-blanco illustration in Köhler's Medizinal-Pflanzen

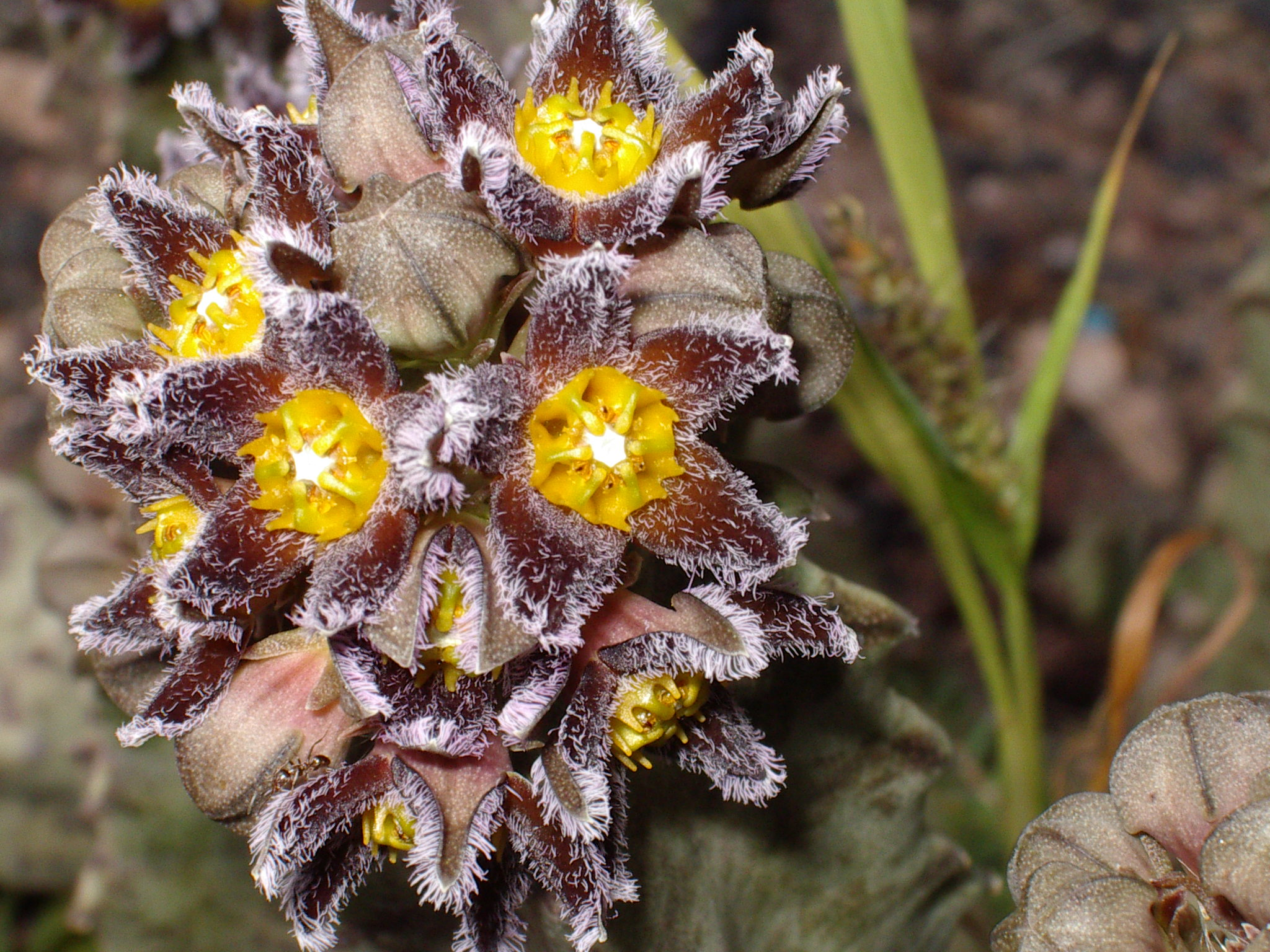
Apteranthes burchardii

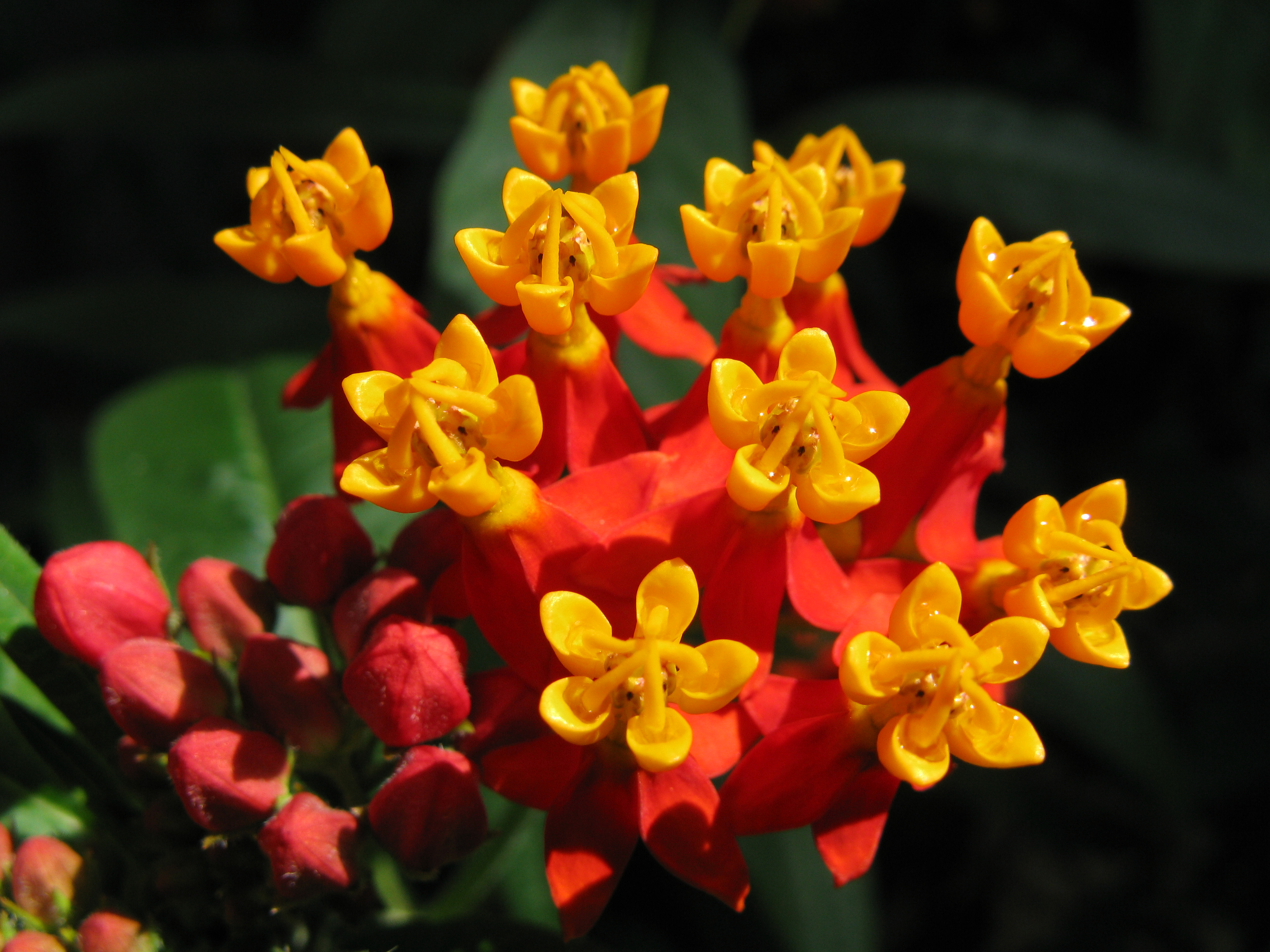
Asclepias curassavica

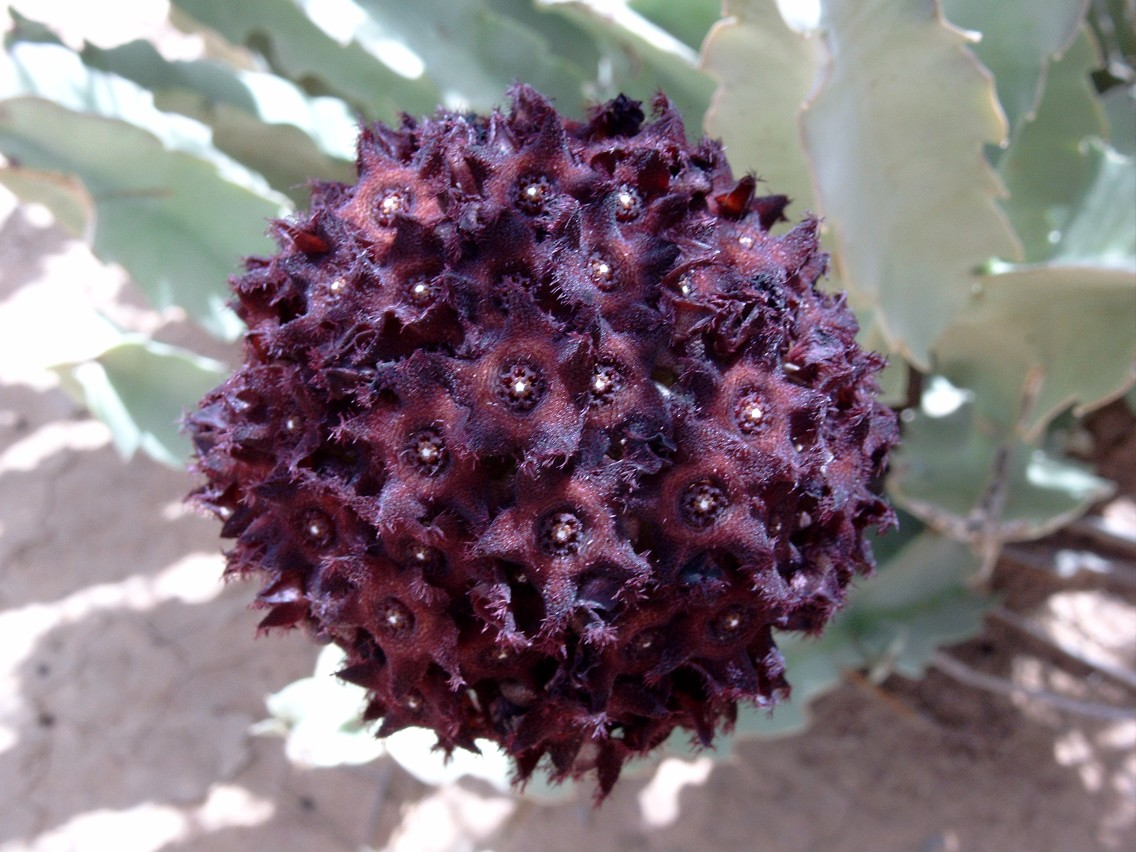
Caralluma acutangula

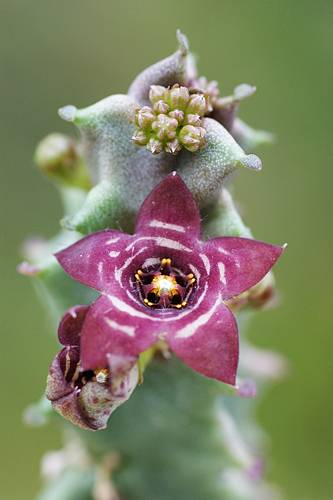
Caralluma europaea

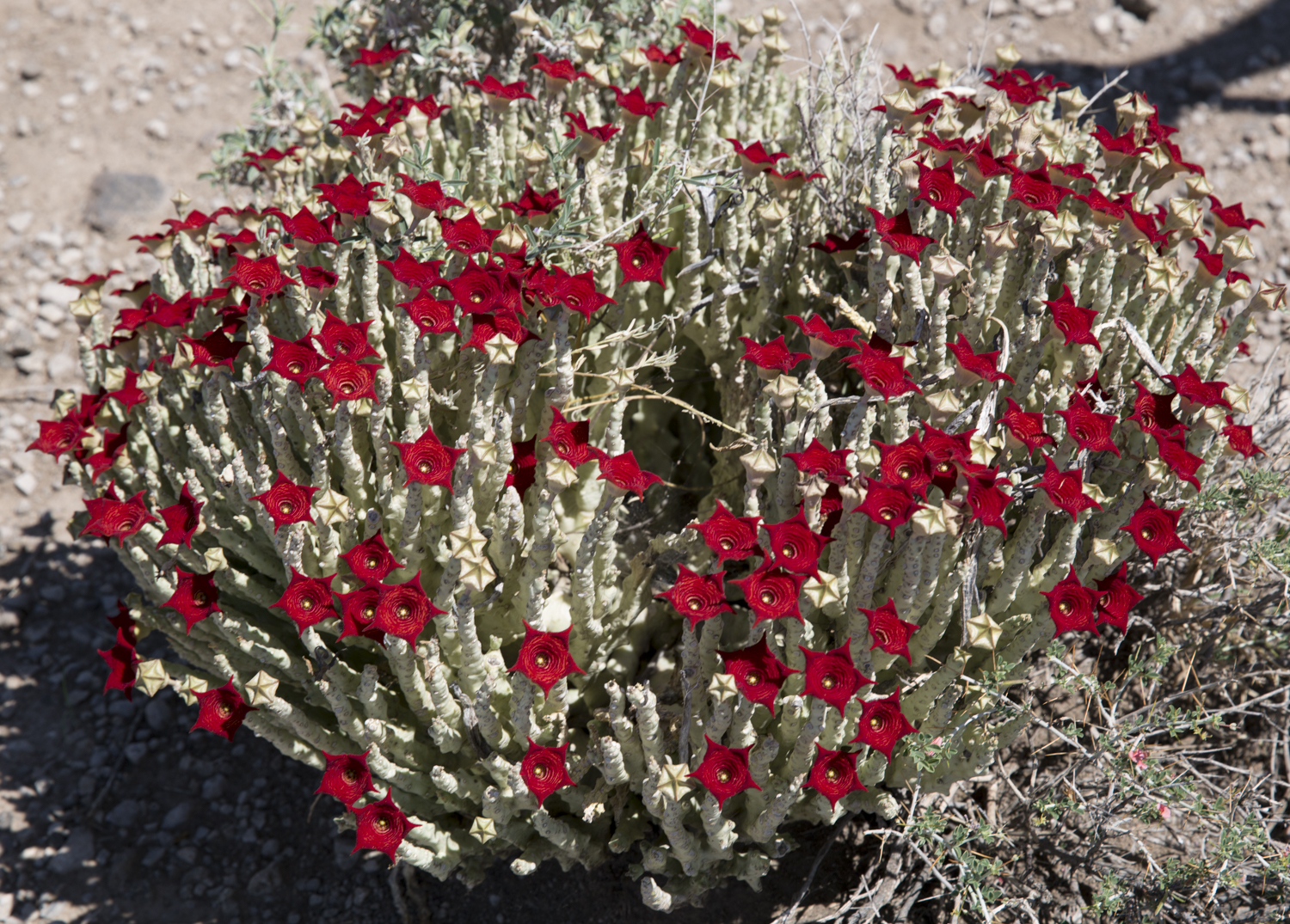
Caralluma socotrana

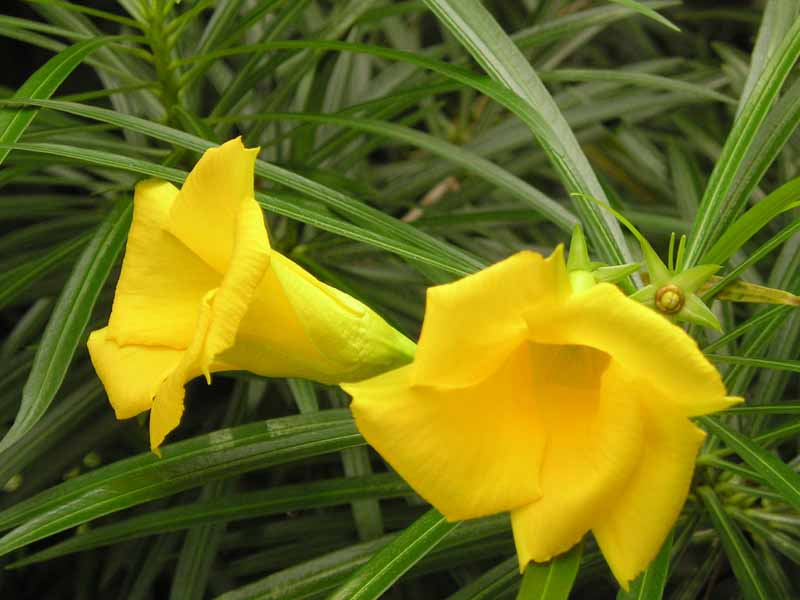
Cascabela thevetia (syn. Thevetia peruviana)

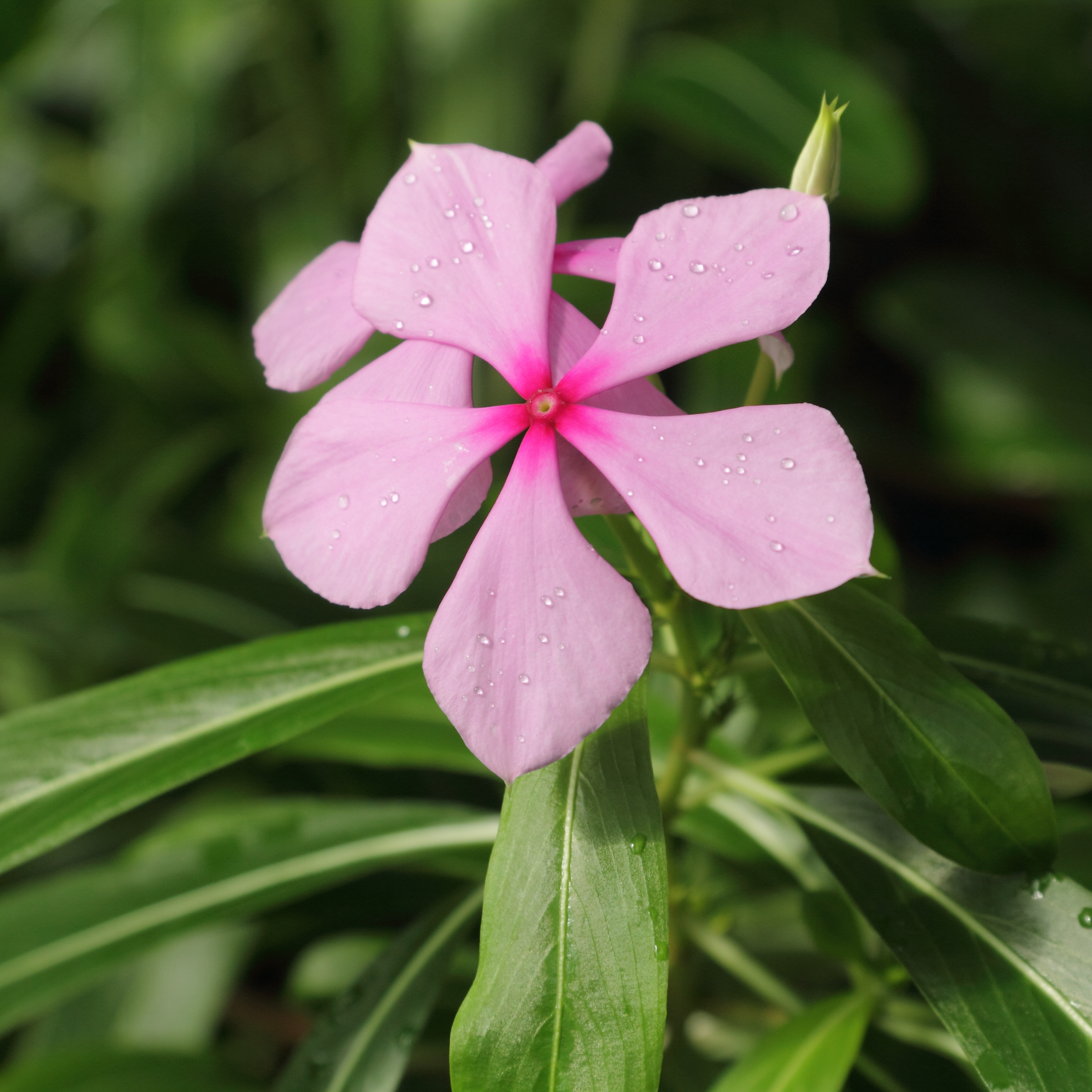
Catharanthus roseus

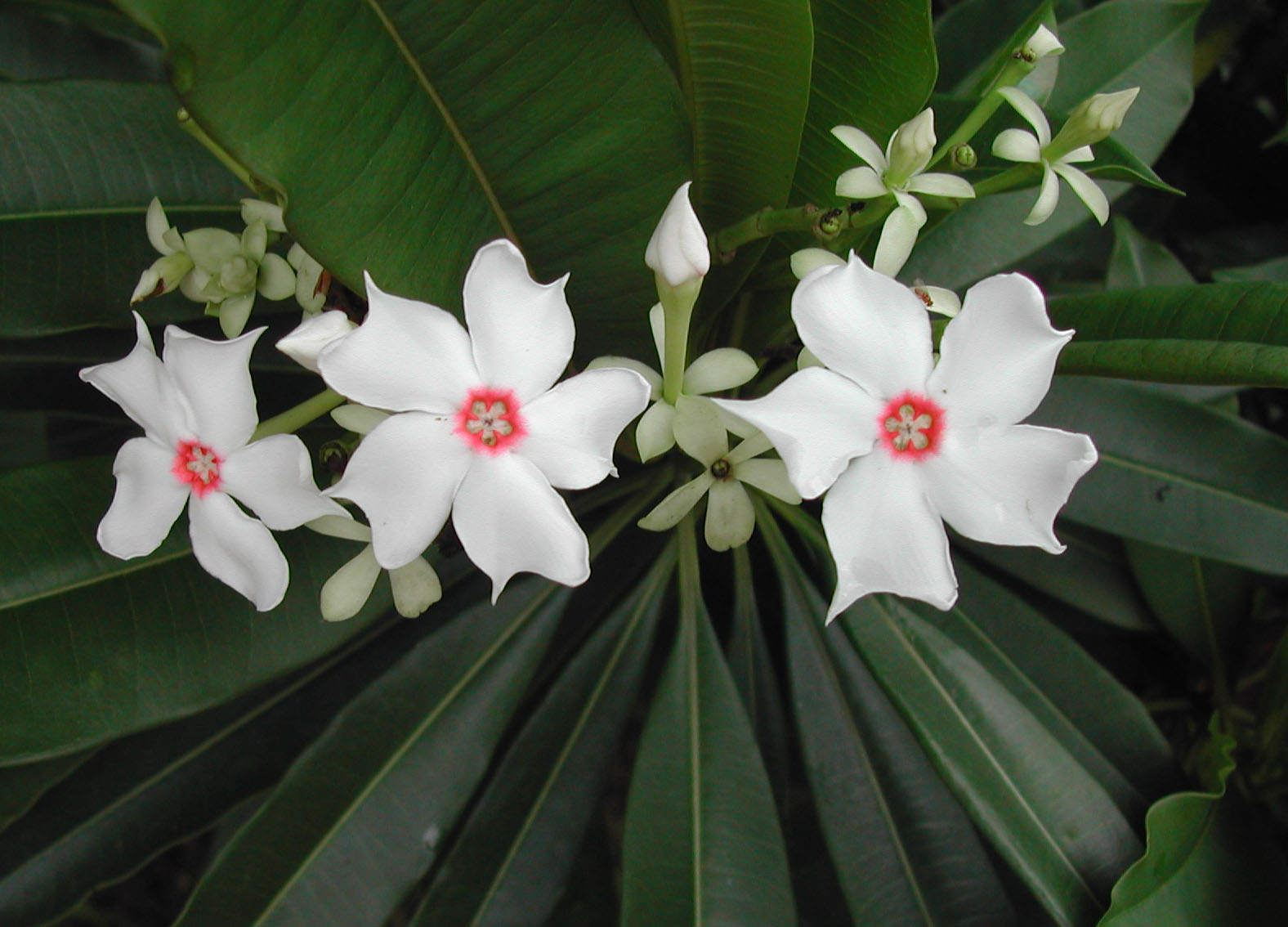
Cerbera manghas

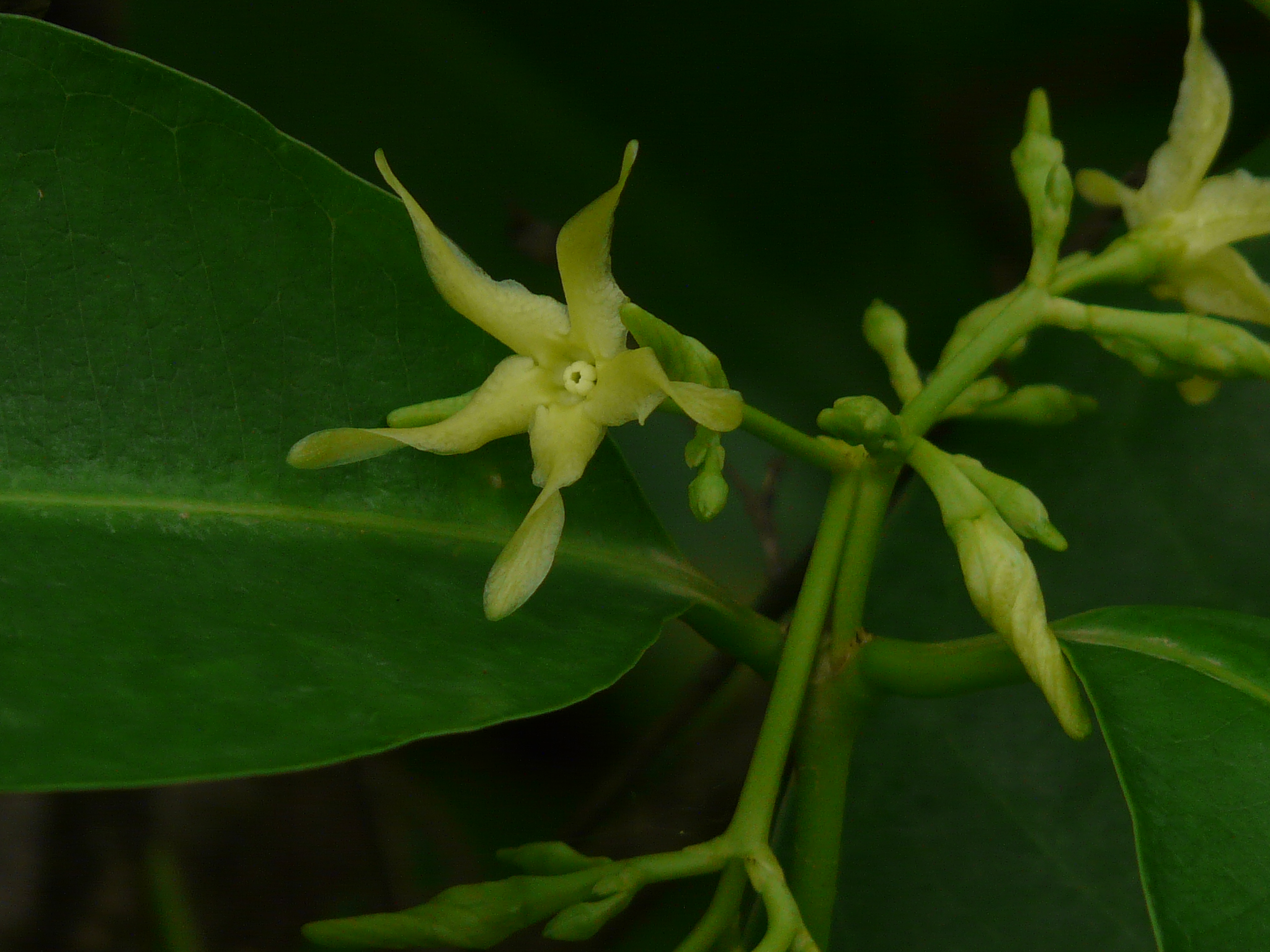
Cryptolepis dubia

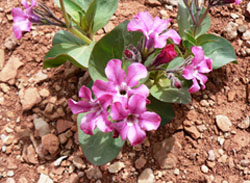
Cycladenia humilis var.jonesii

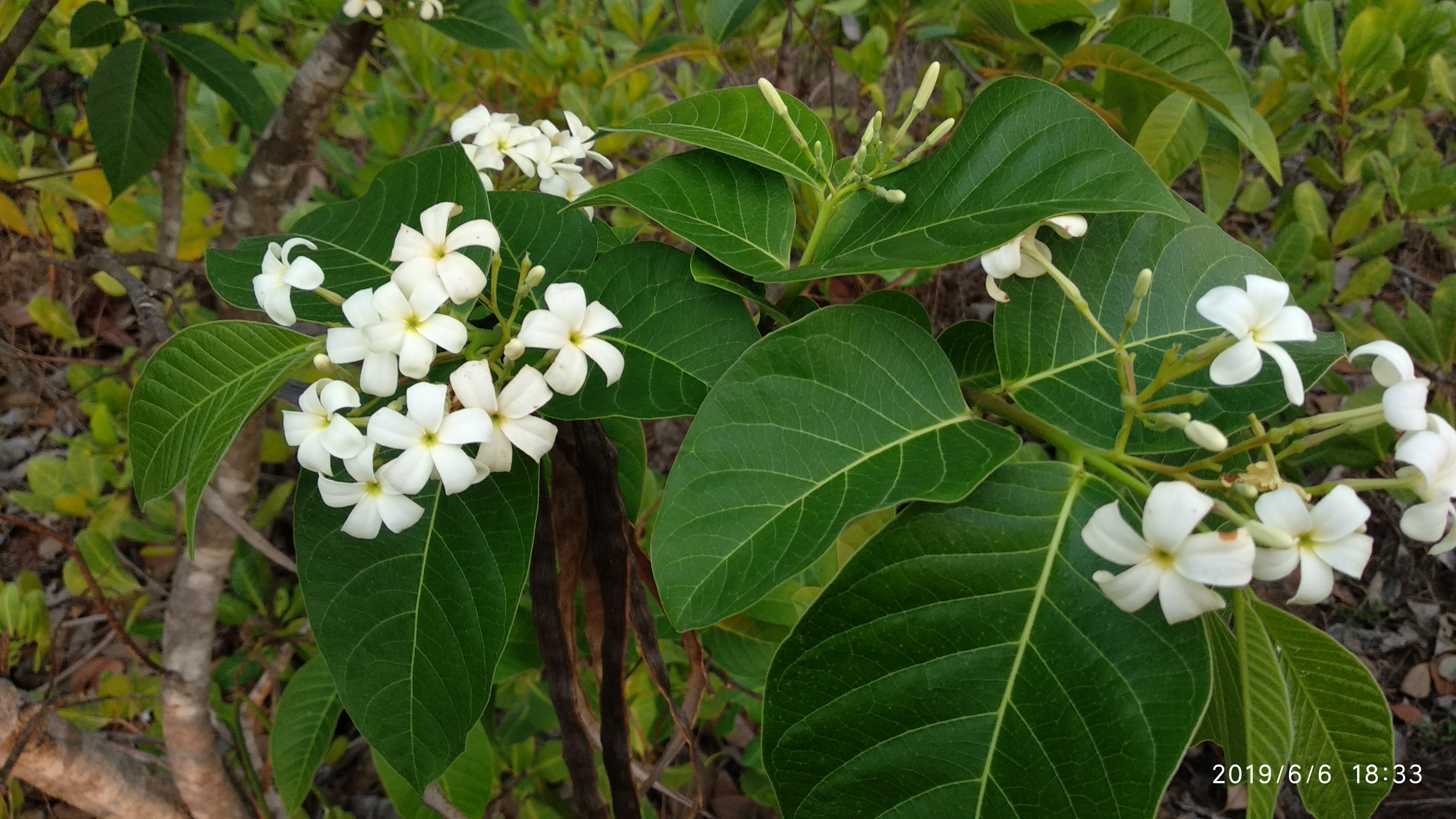
Holarrhena pubescens

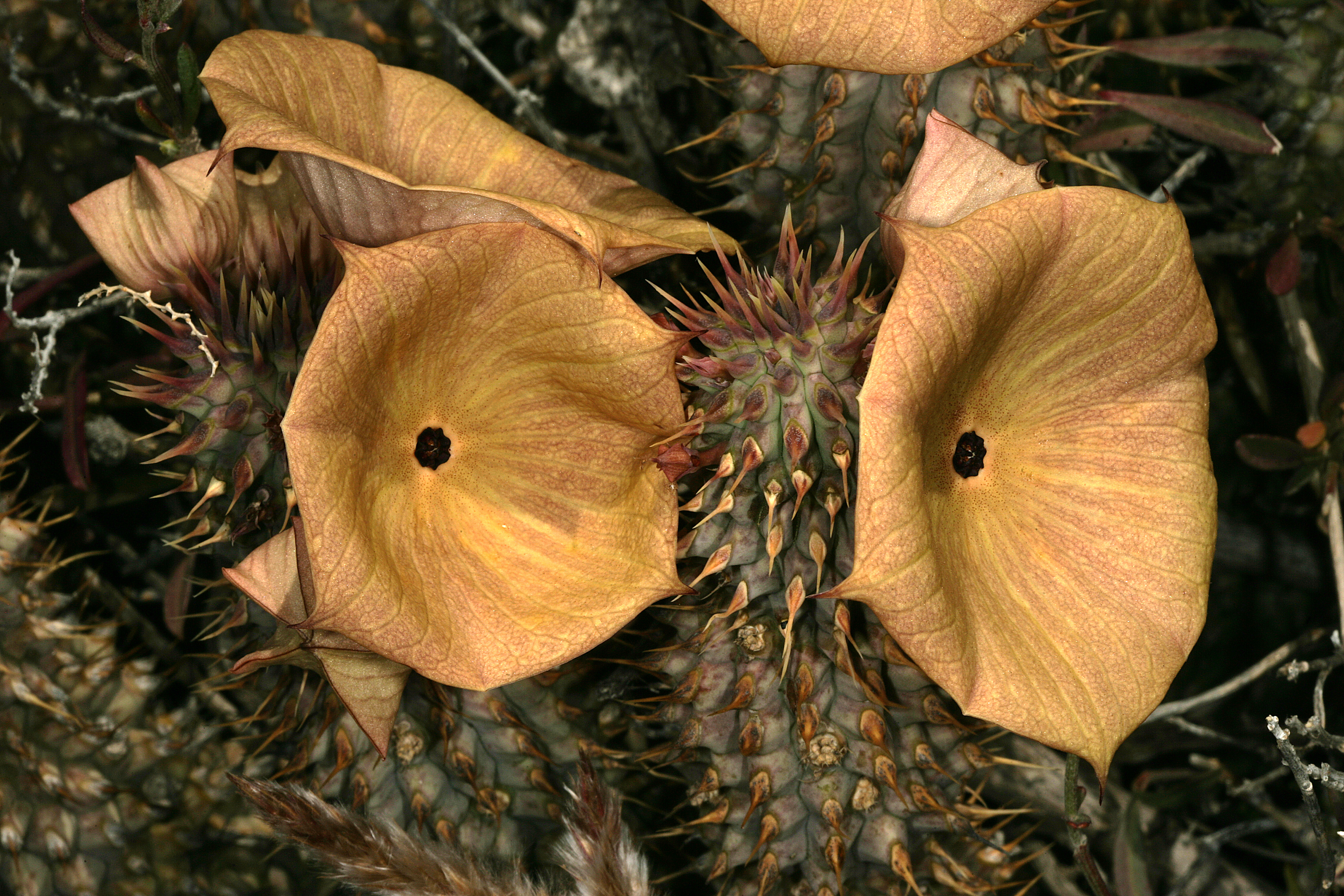
Hoodia gordonii

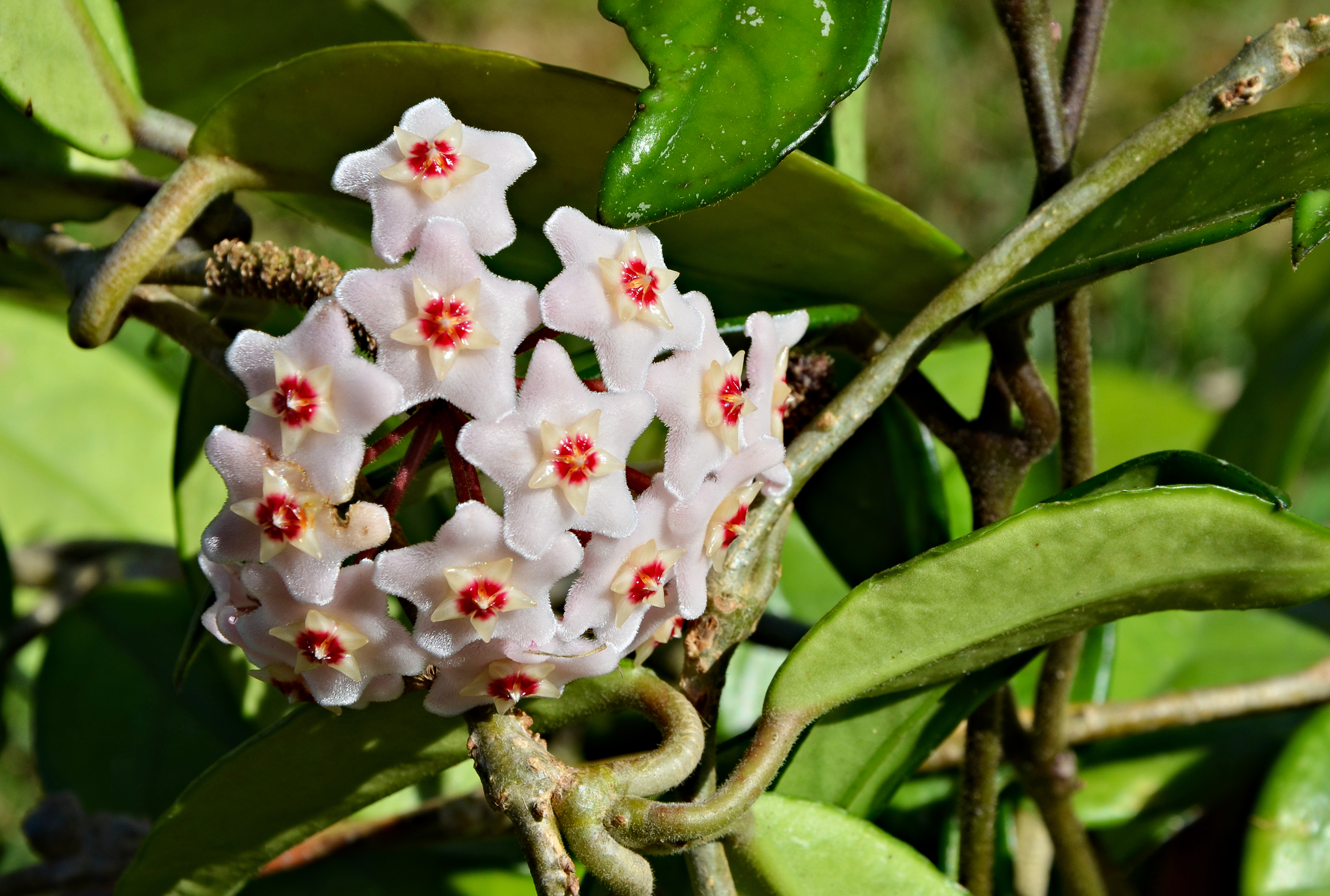
Hoya carnosa

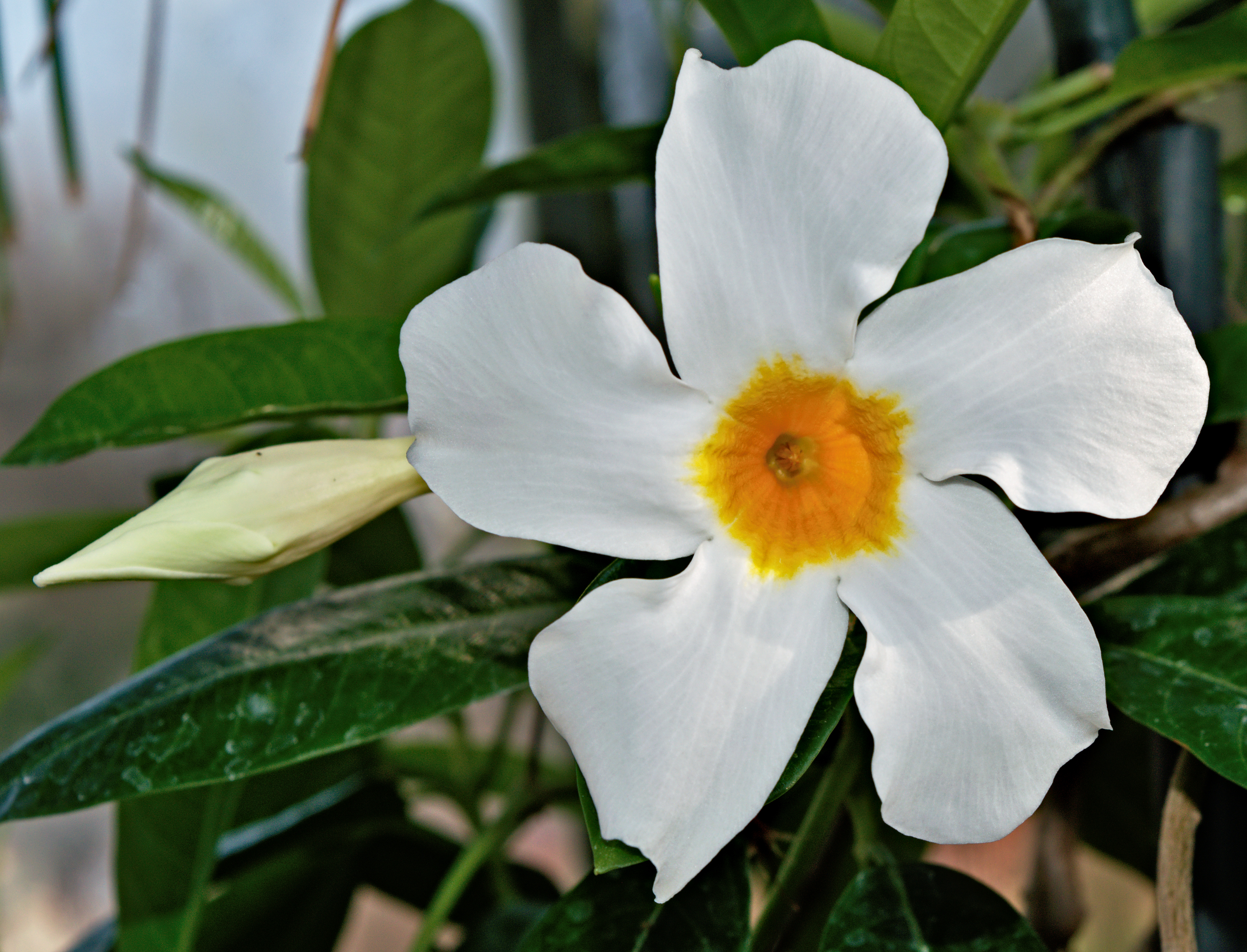
Mandevilla boliviensis

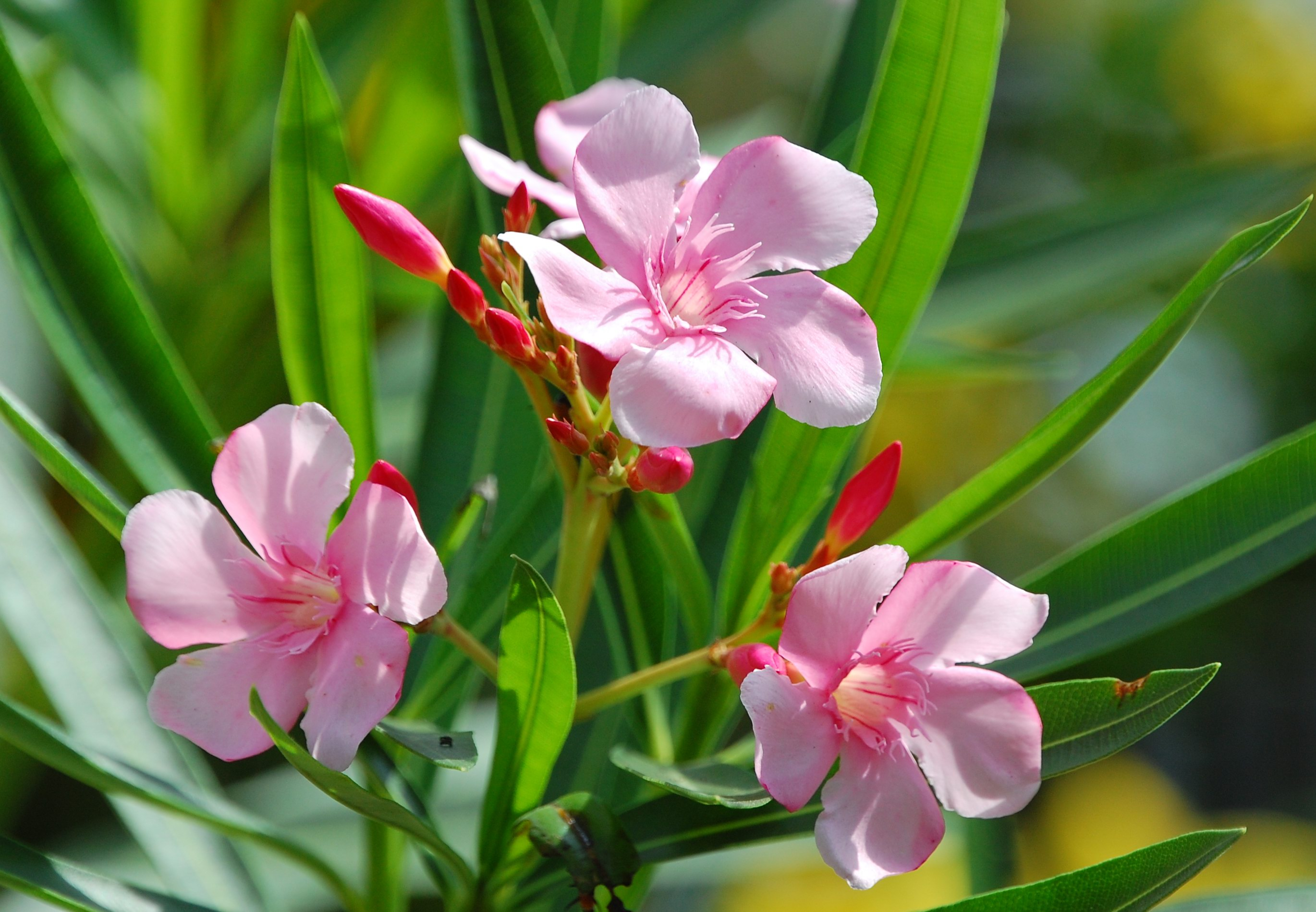
Nerium oleander

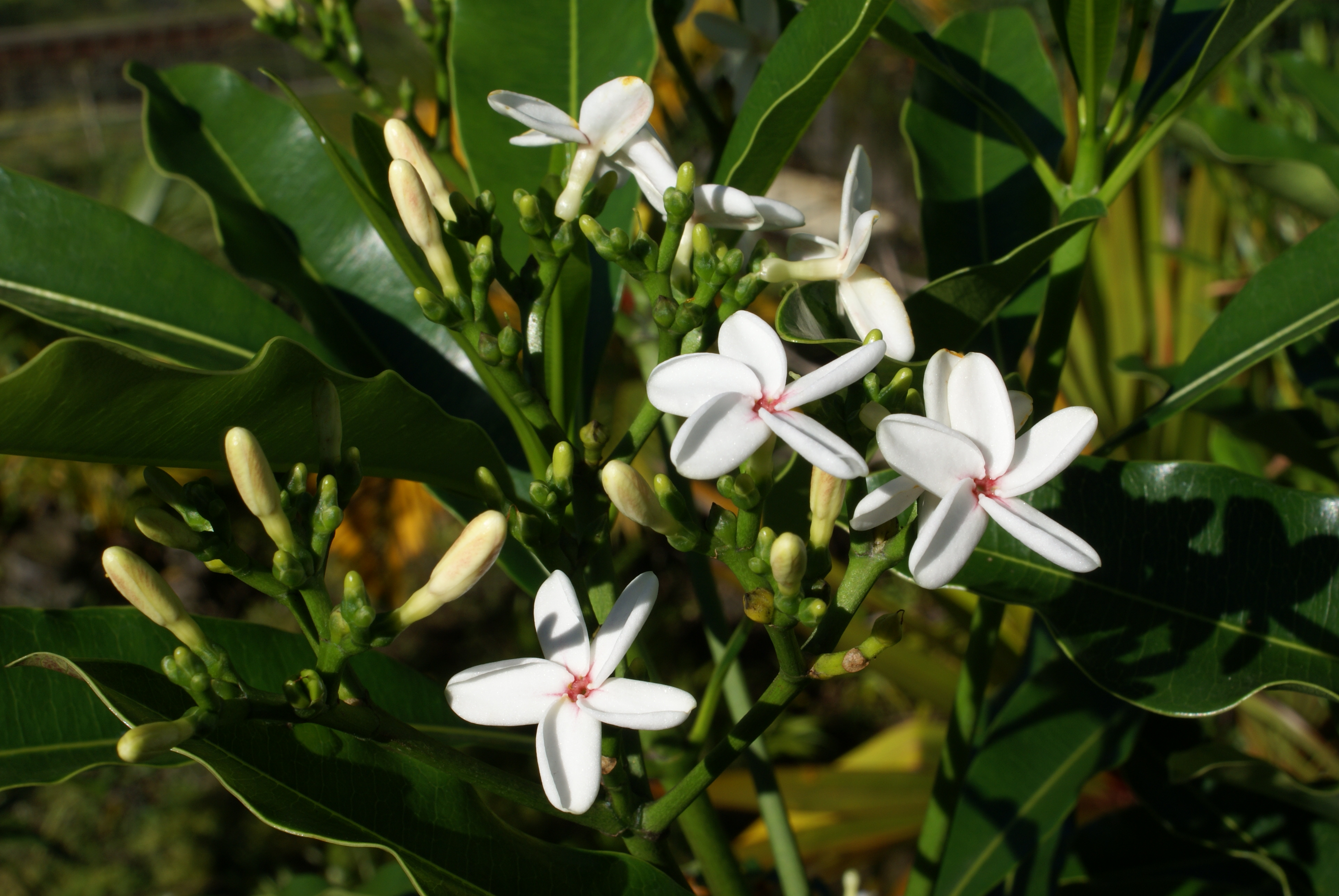
Ochrosia borbonica

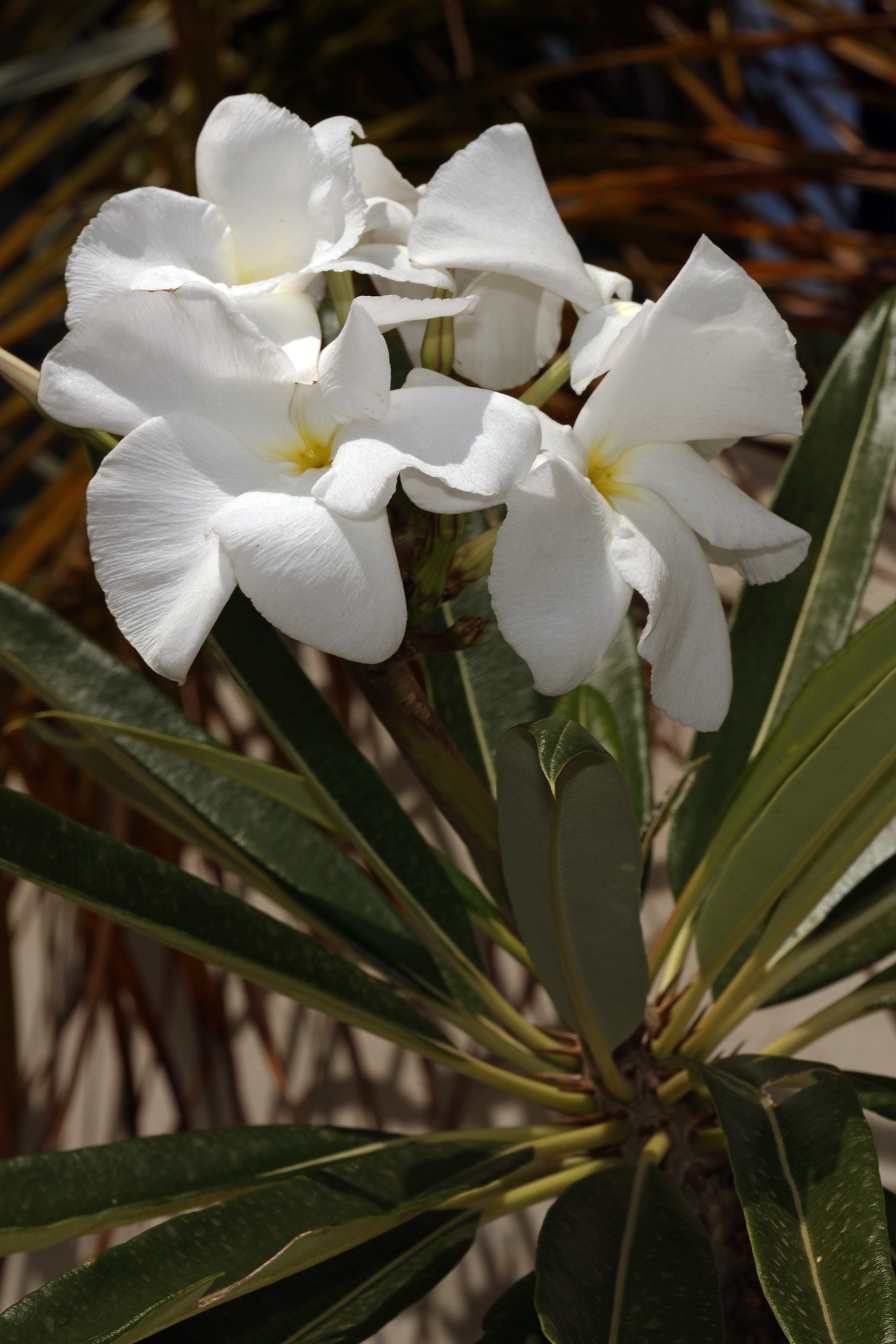
Pachypodium lamerei

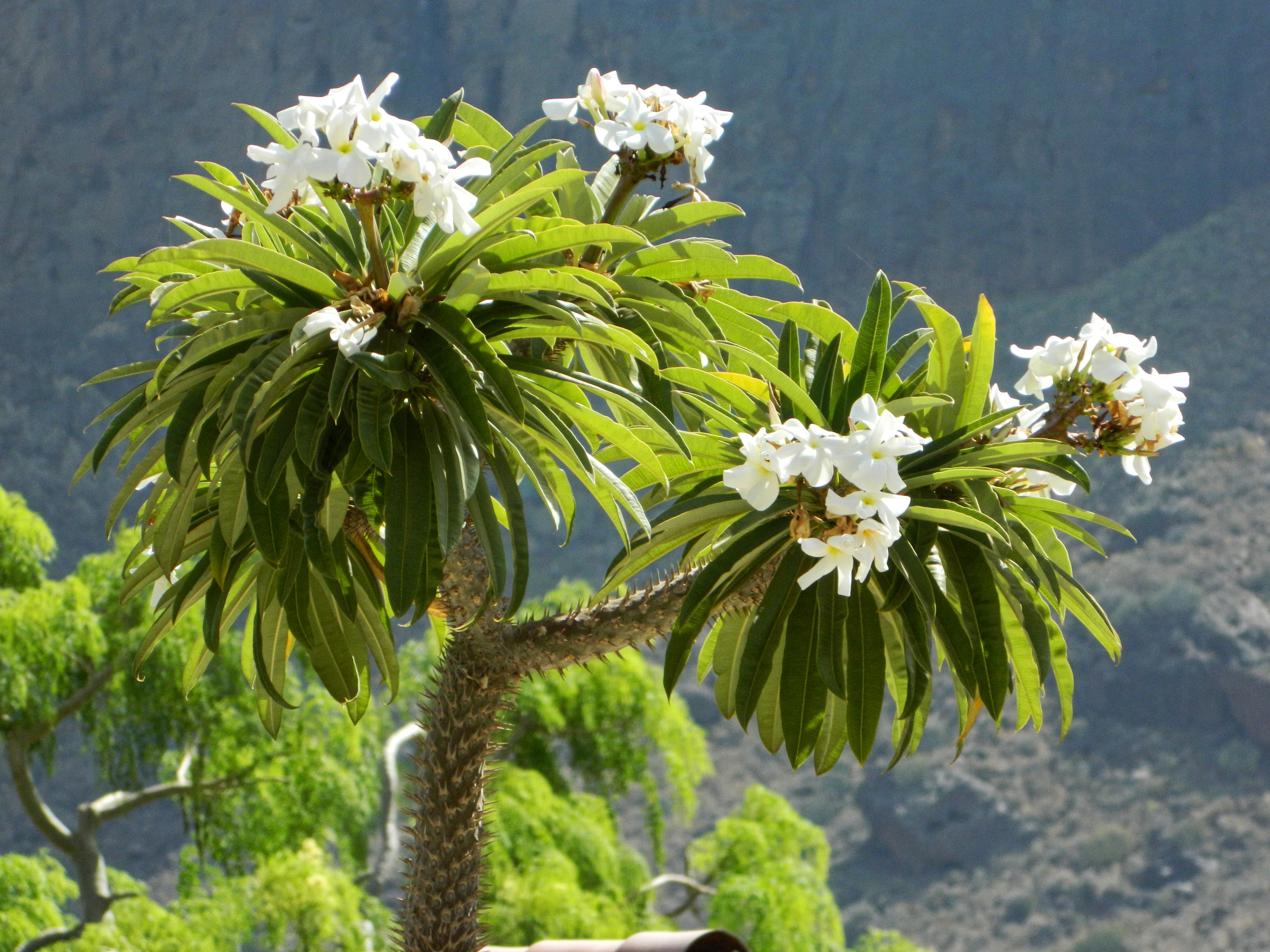
Pachypodium lamerei growth habit

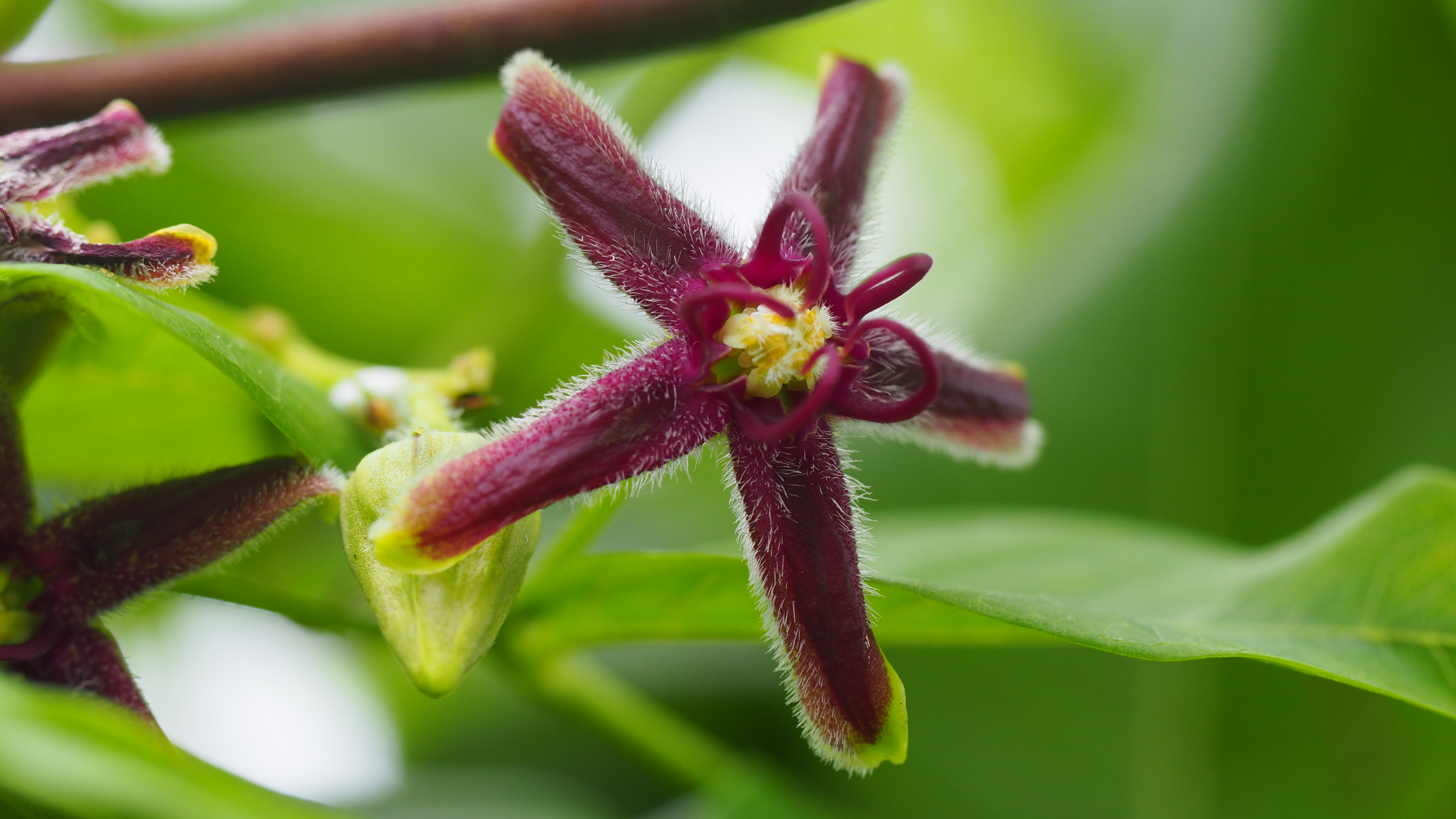
Periploca graeca

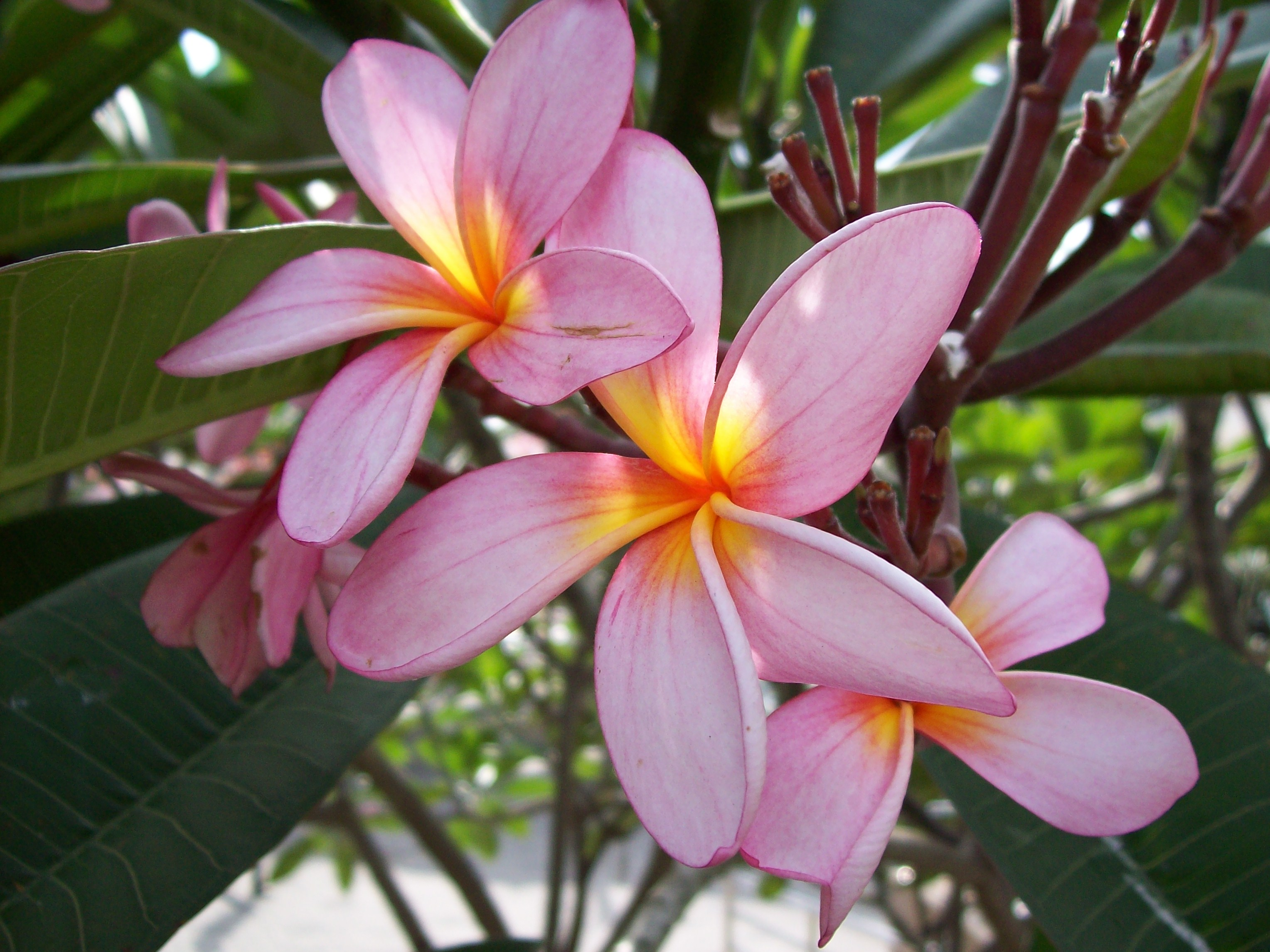
Plumeria rubra

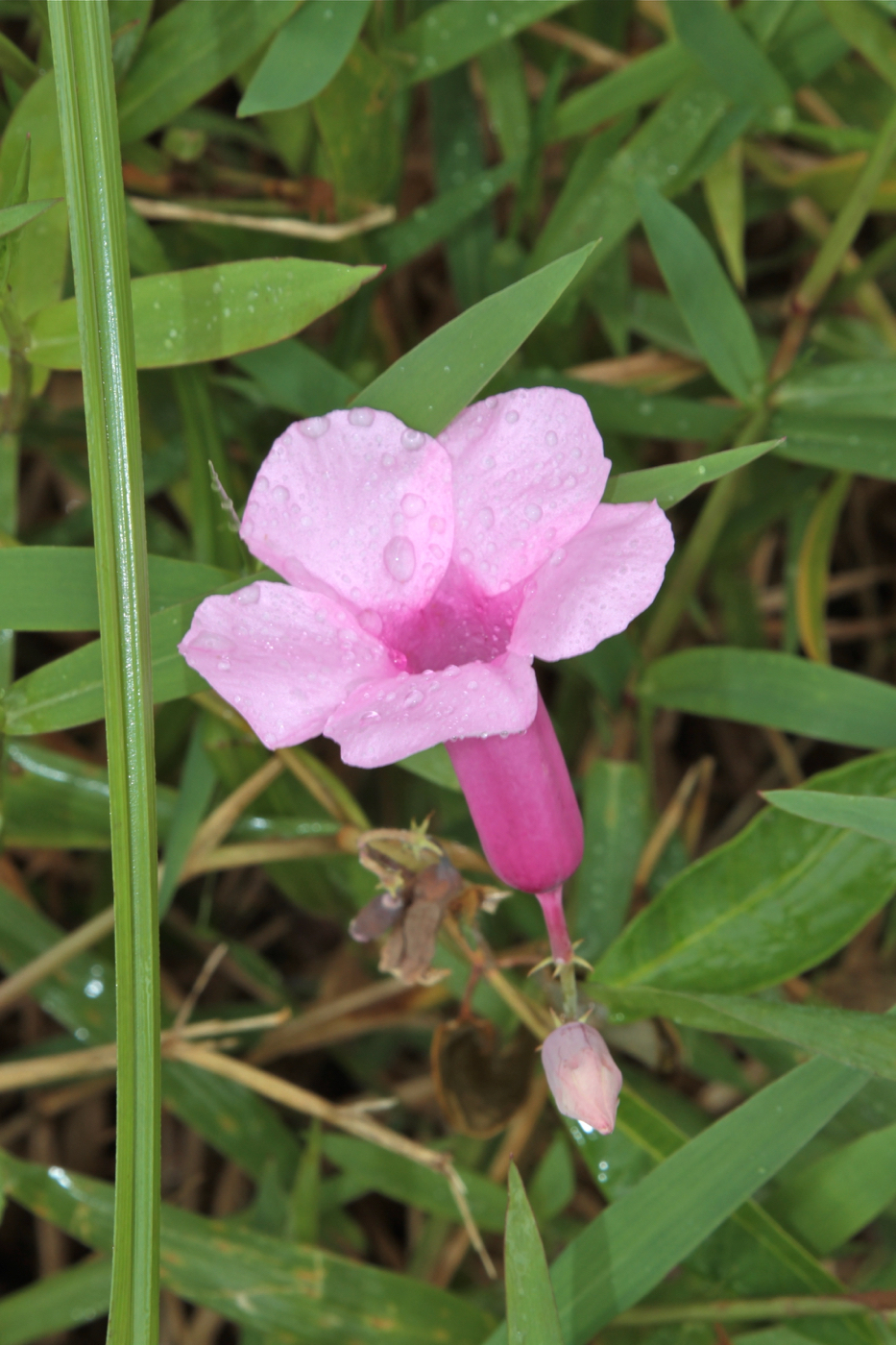
Rhabdadenia madida

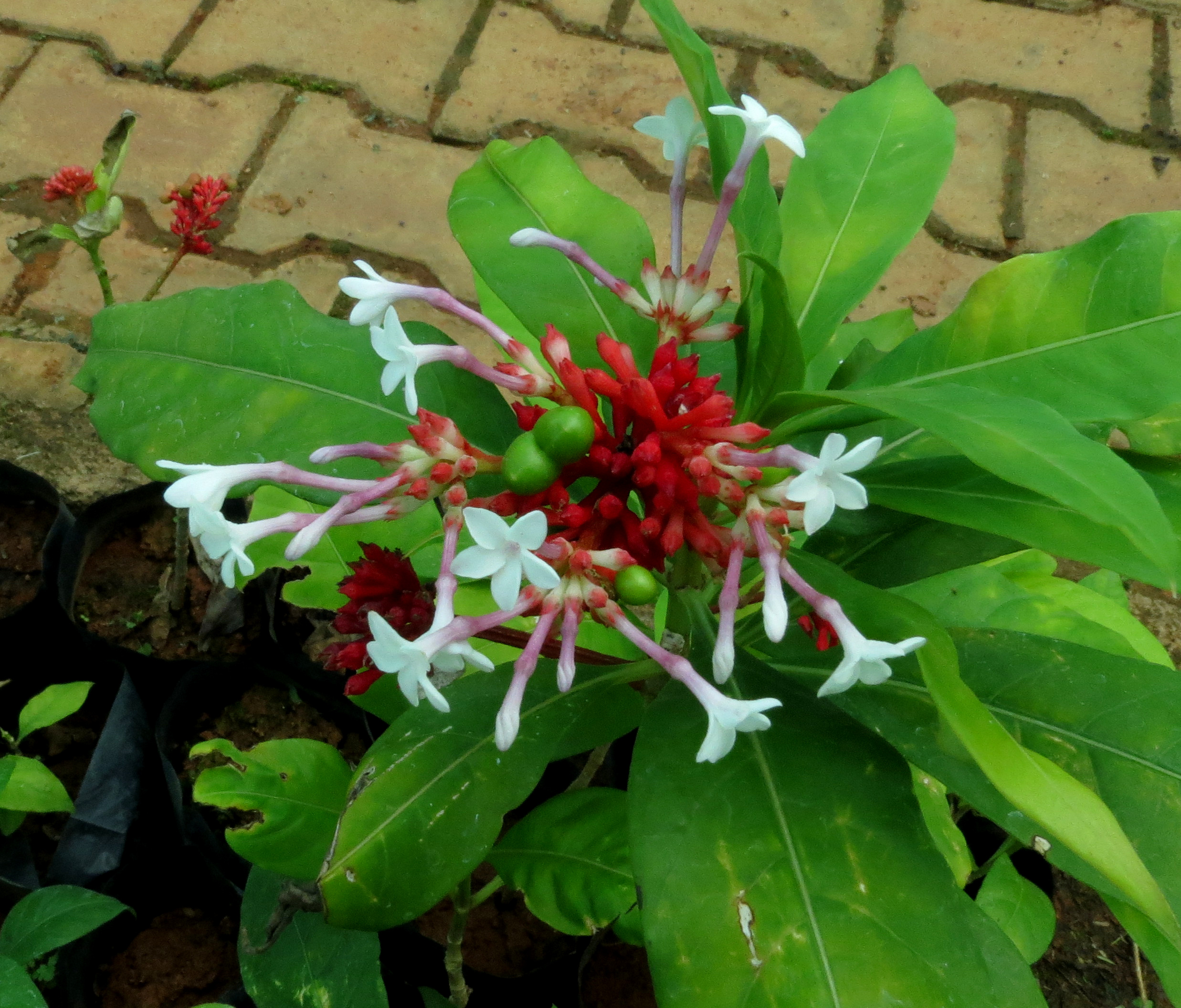
Rauvolfia serpentina

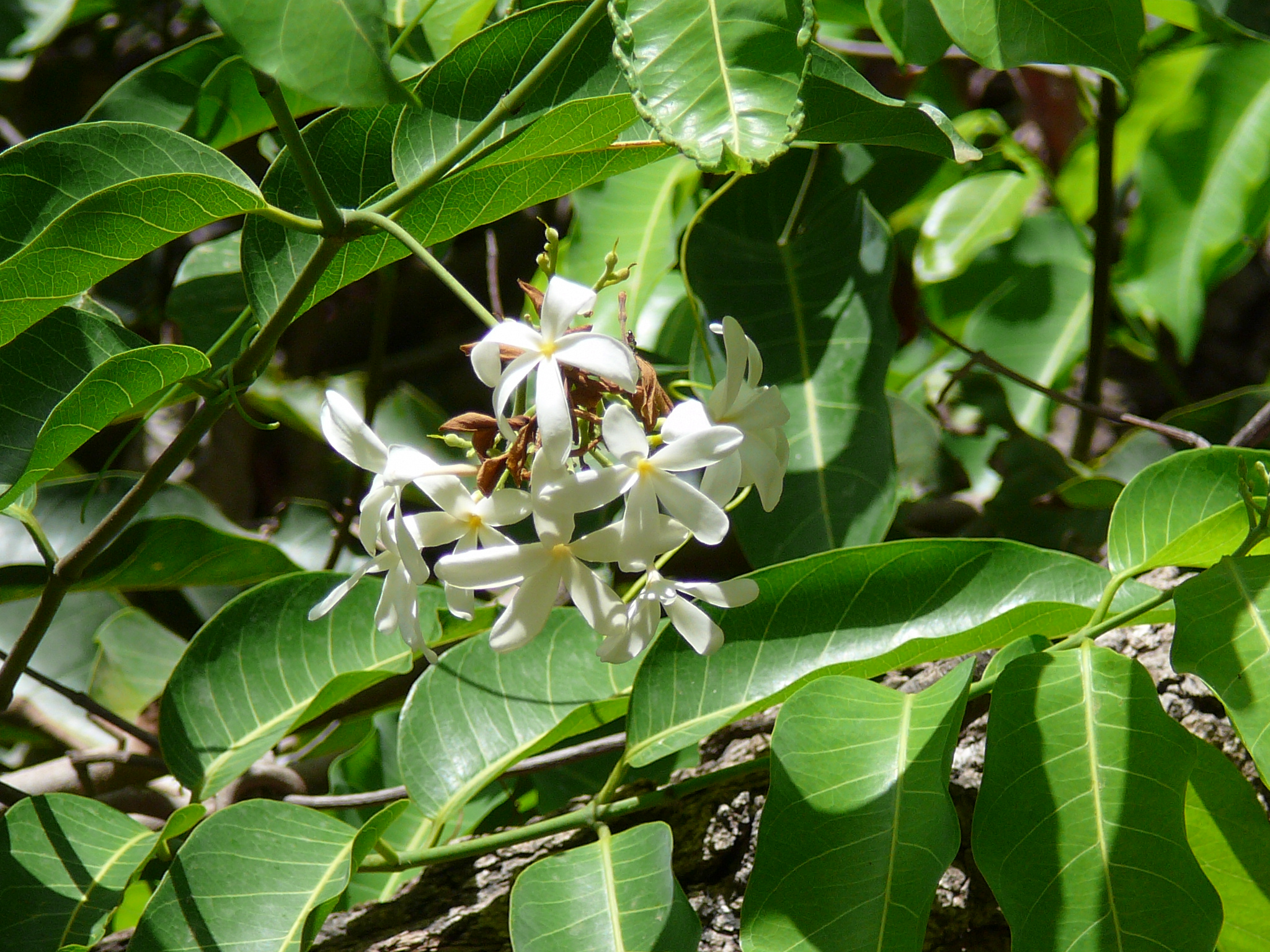
Saba senegalensis

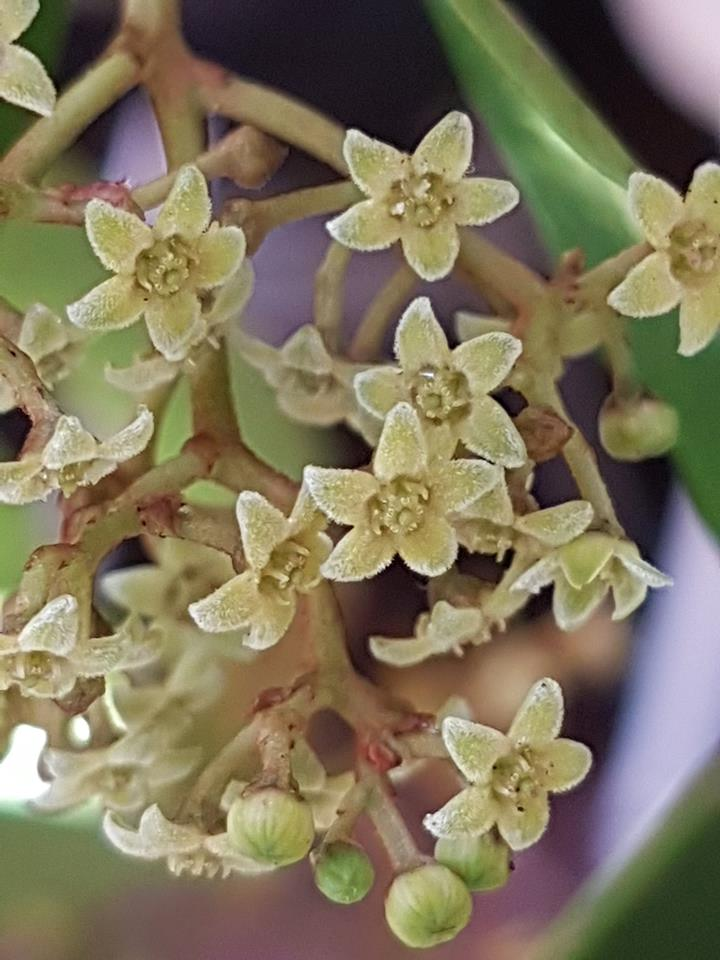
Secamone alpini

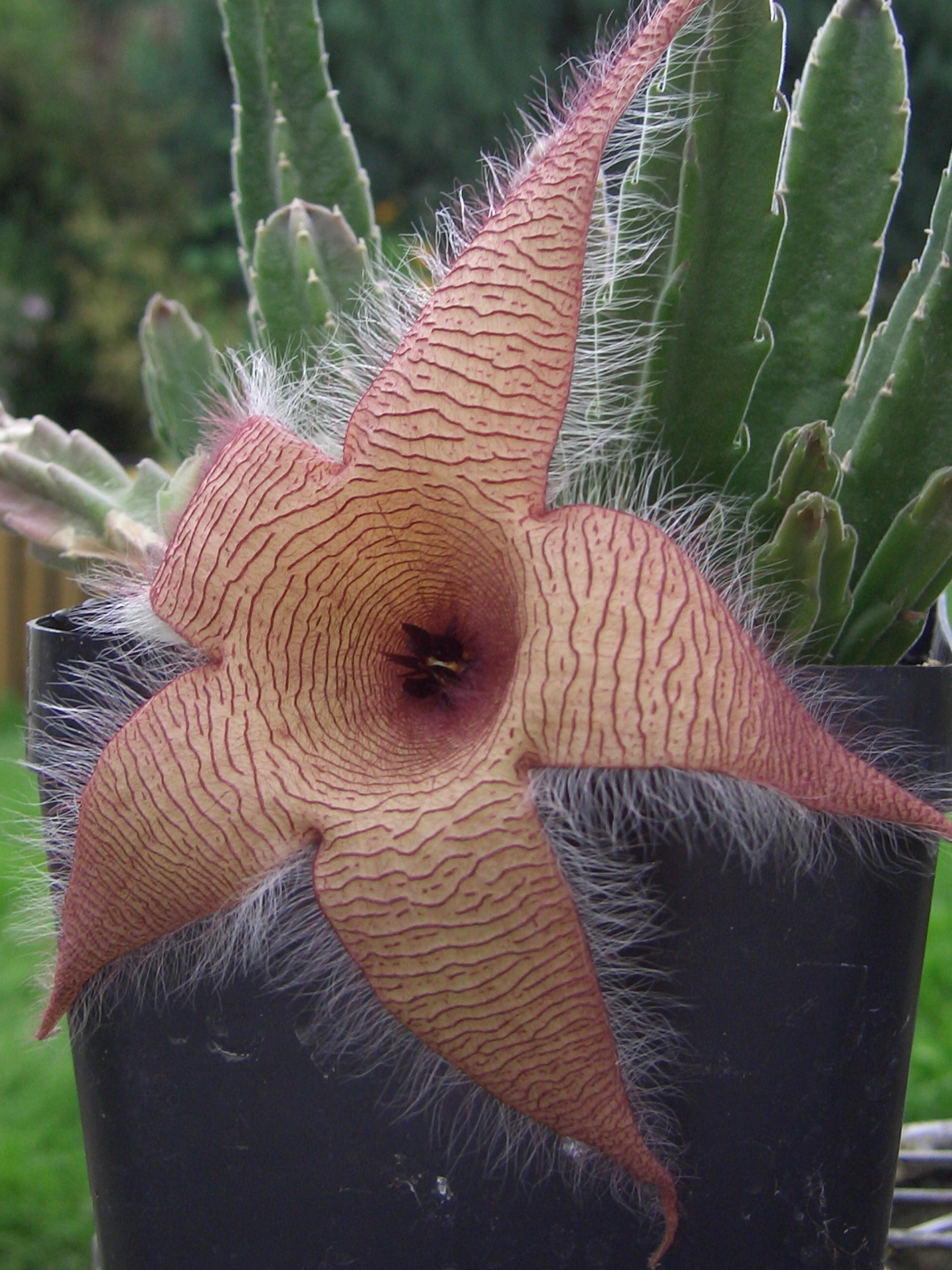
Stapelia gigantea

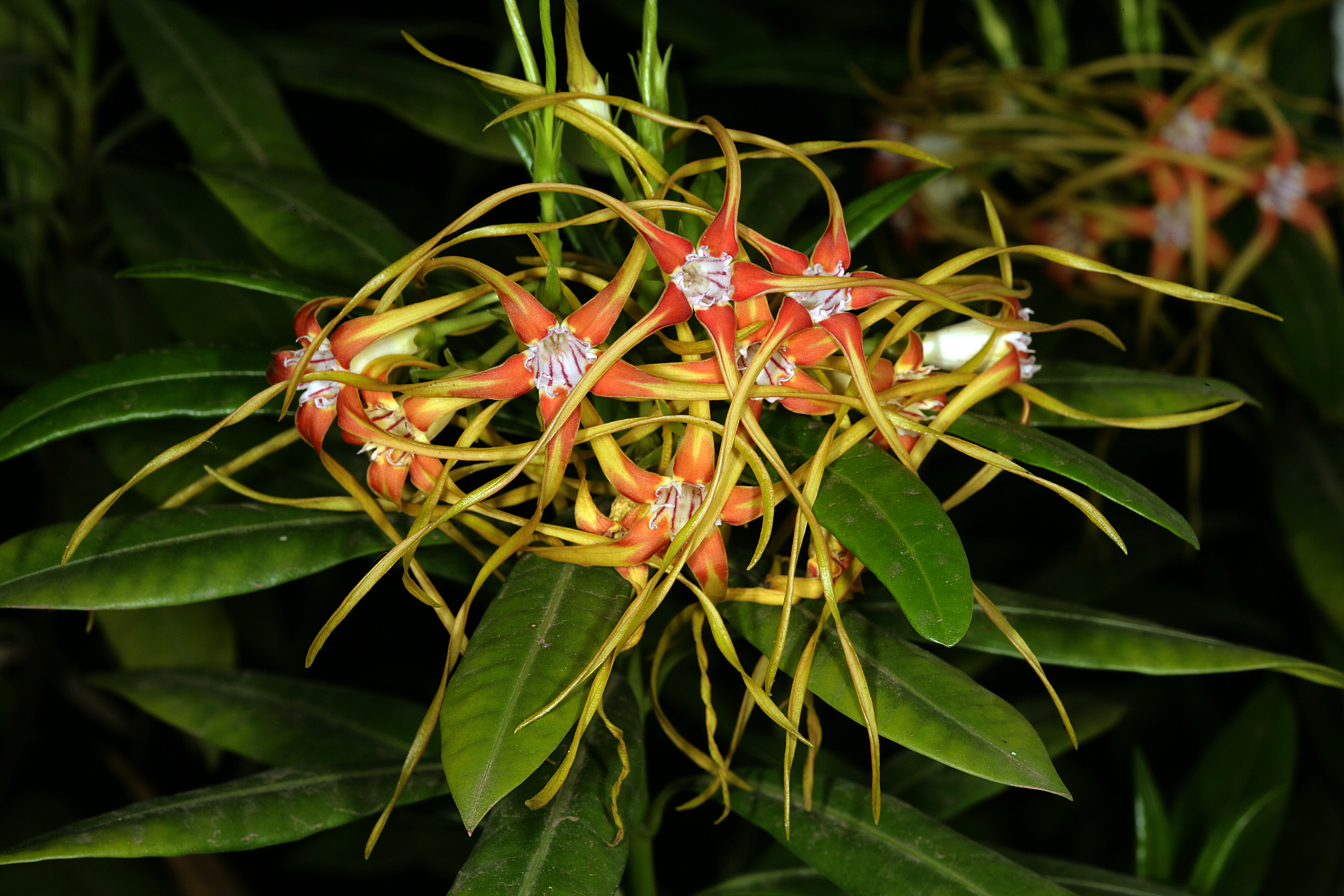
Strophanthus speciosus

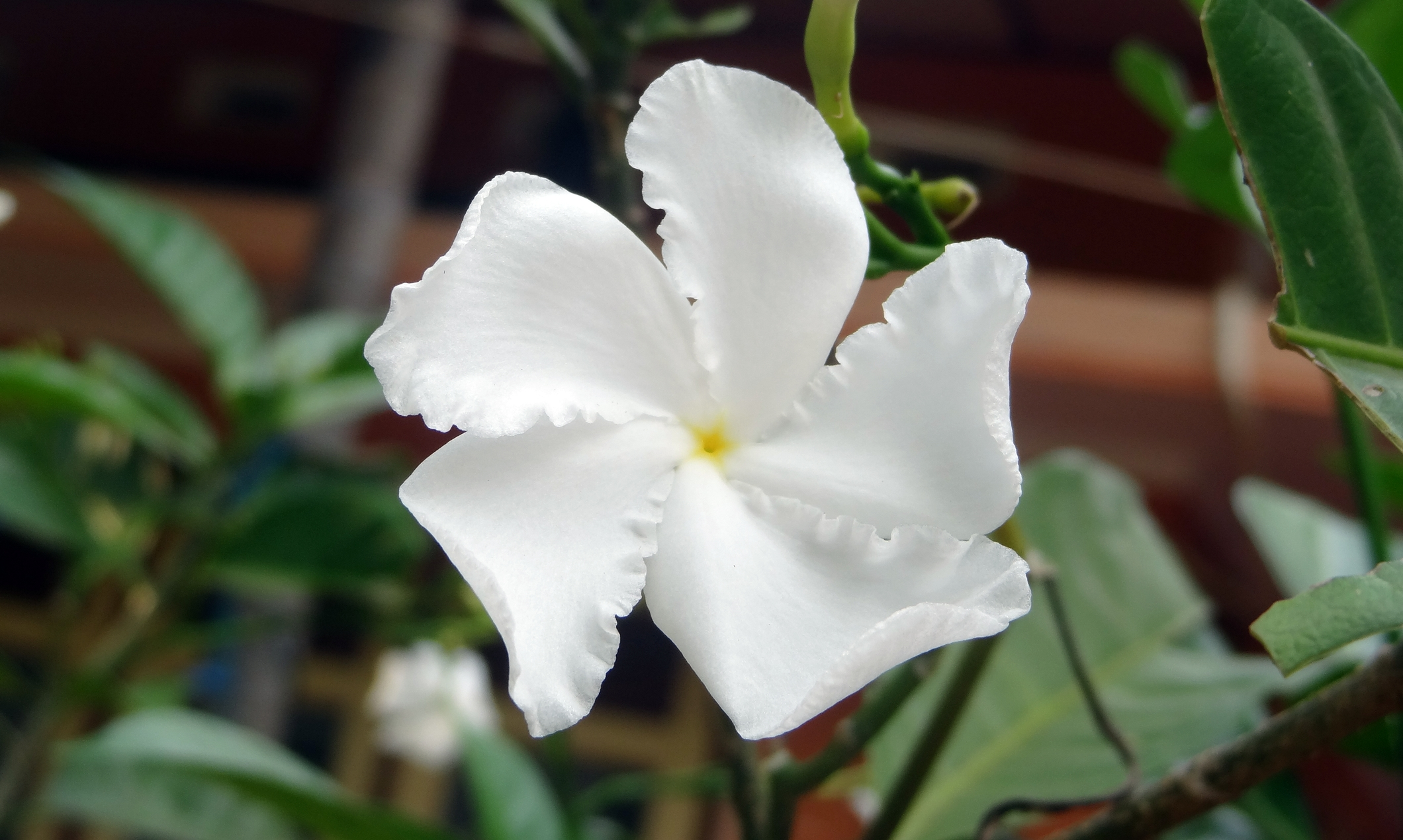
Tabernaemontana divaricata

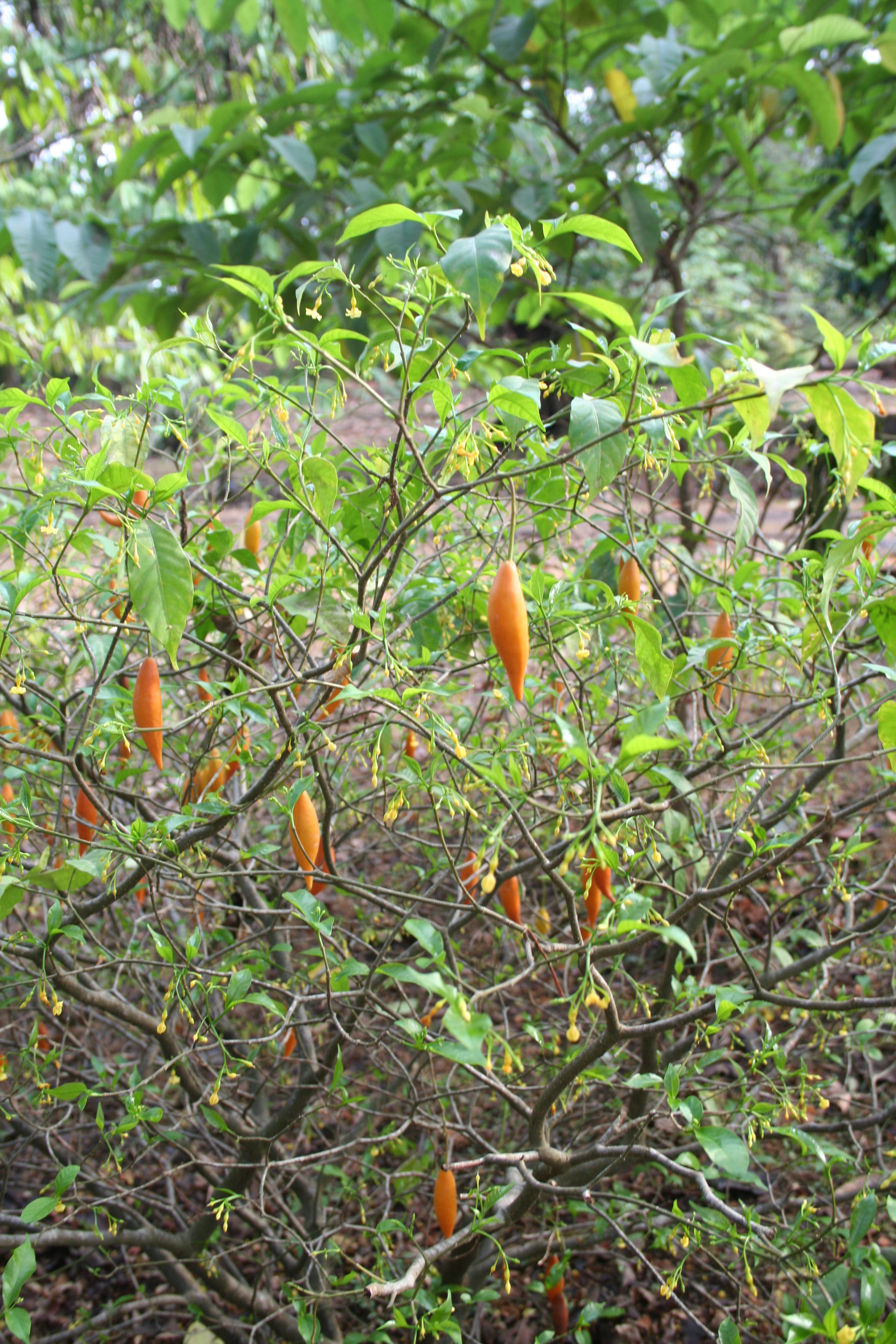
Tabernanthe iboga in flower and fruit

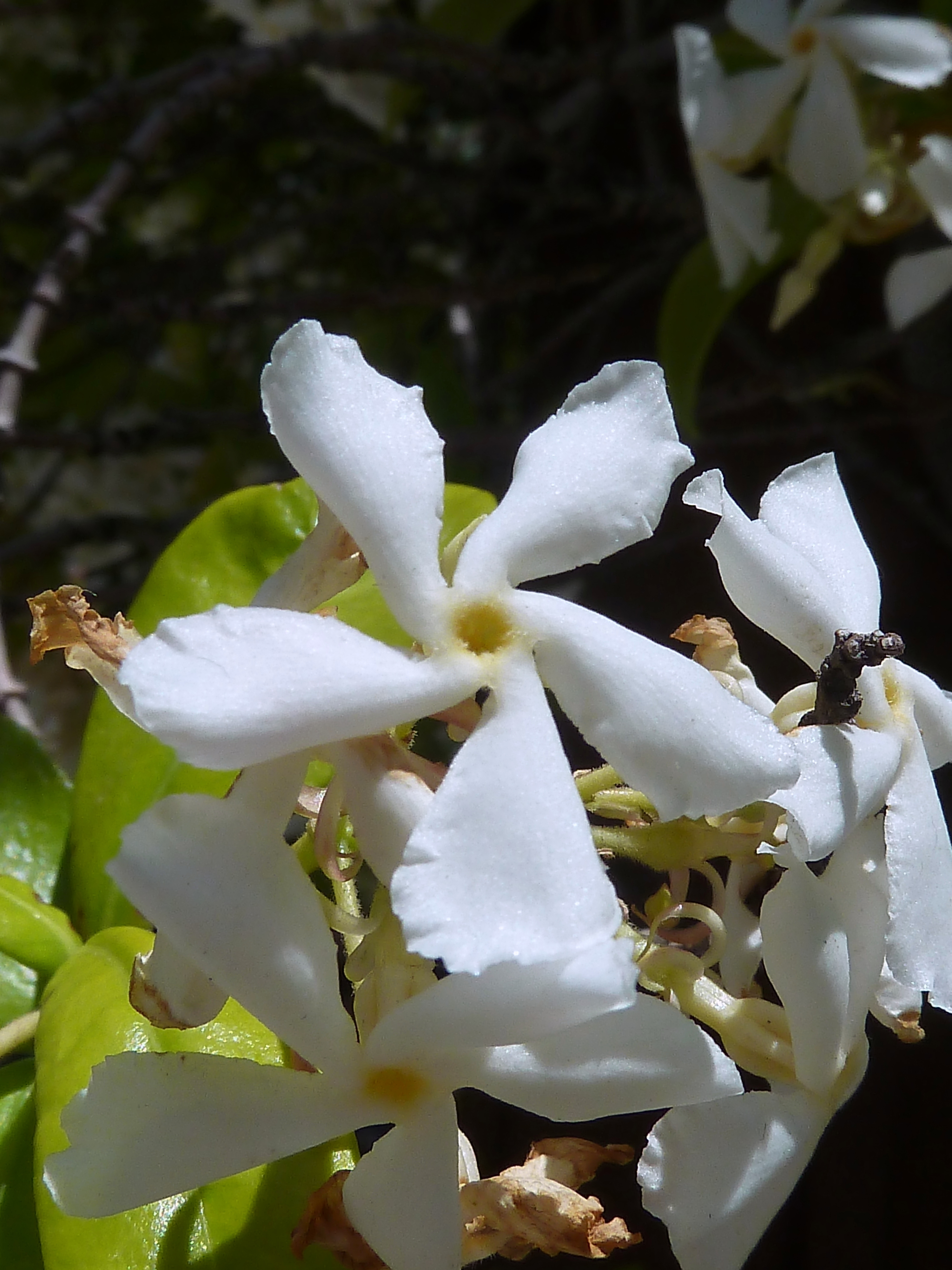
Trachelospermum jasminoides

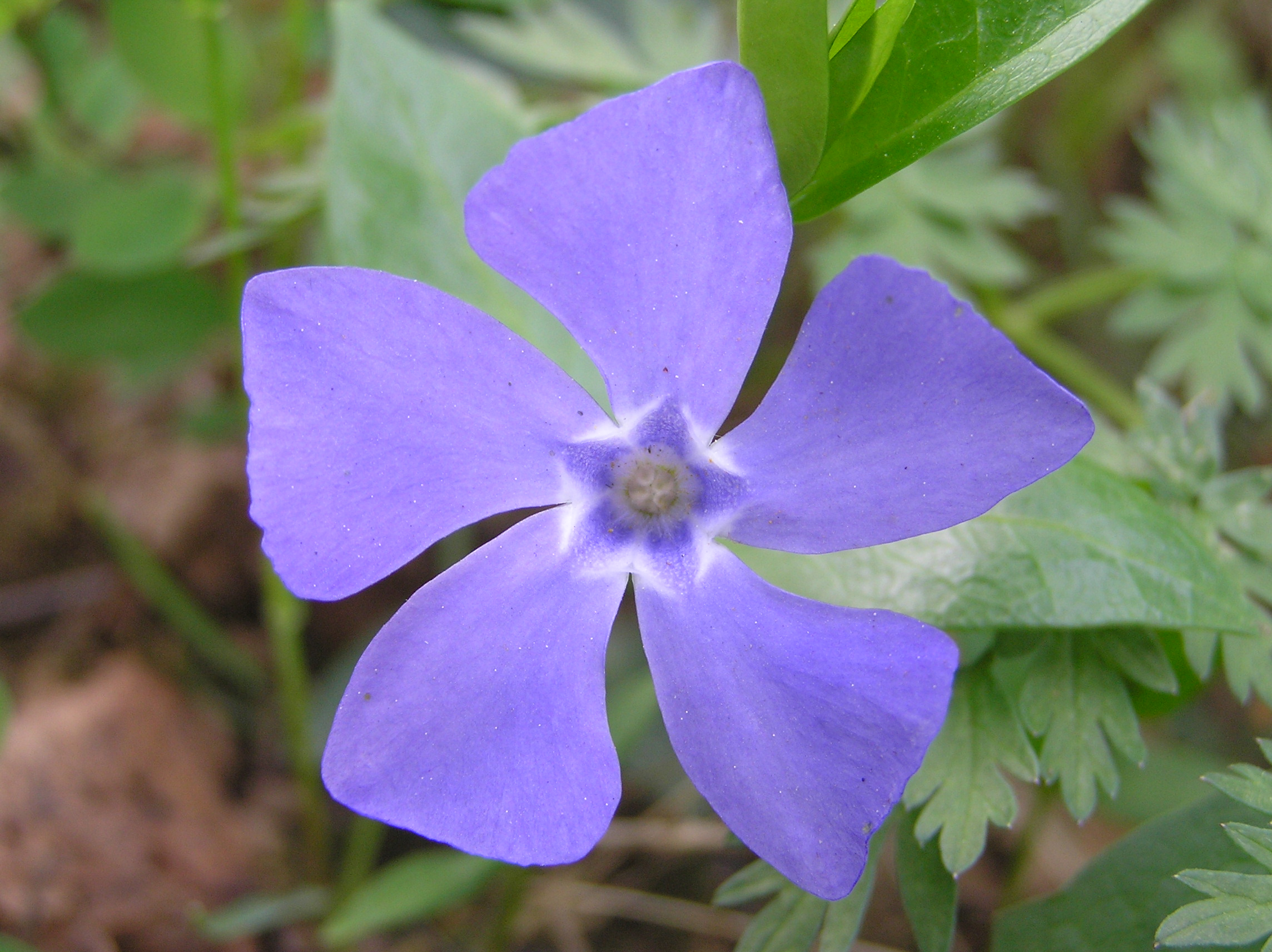
Vinca minor

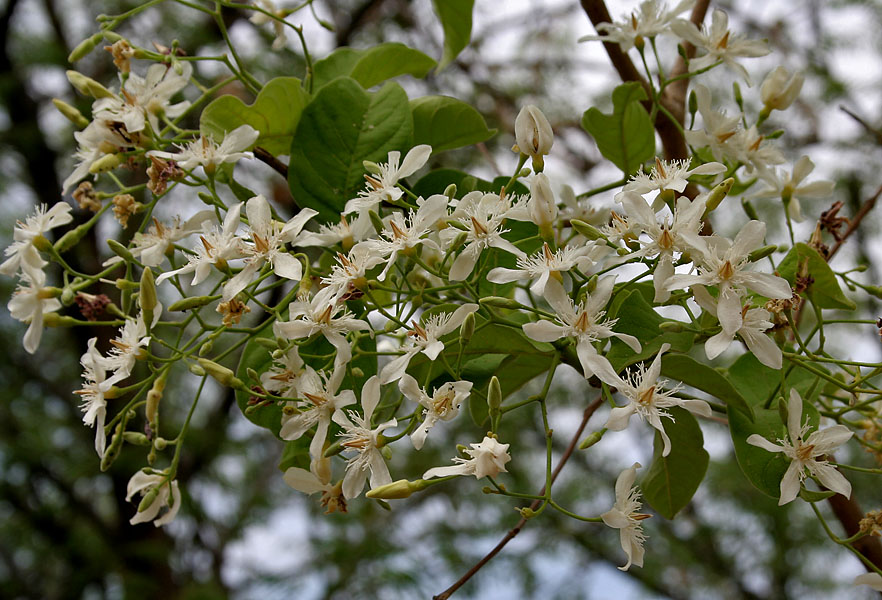
Wrightia tinctoria

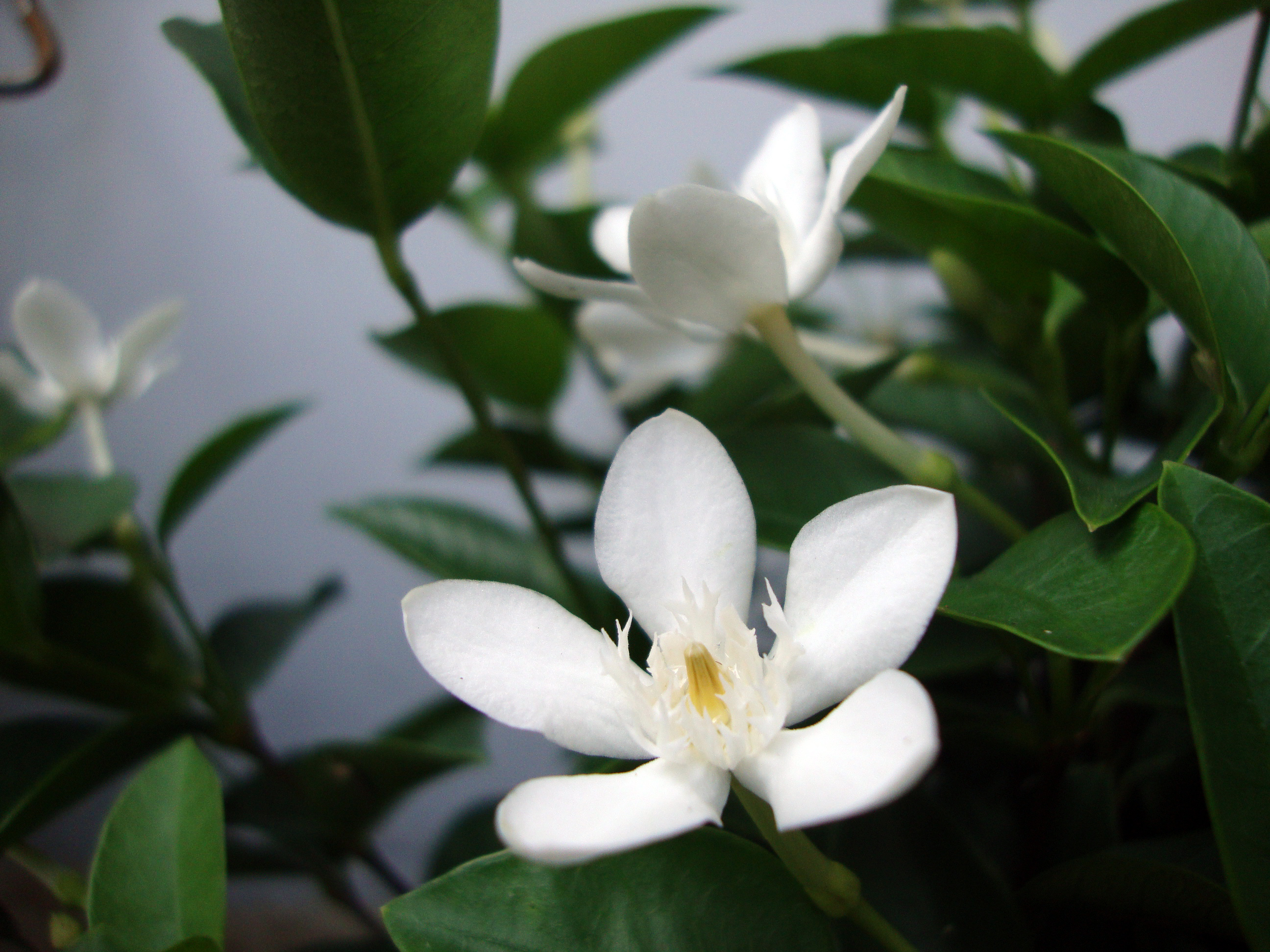
Wrightia antidysenterica

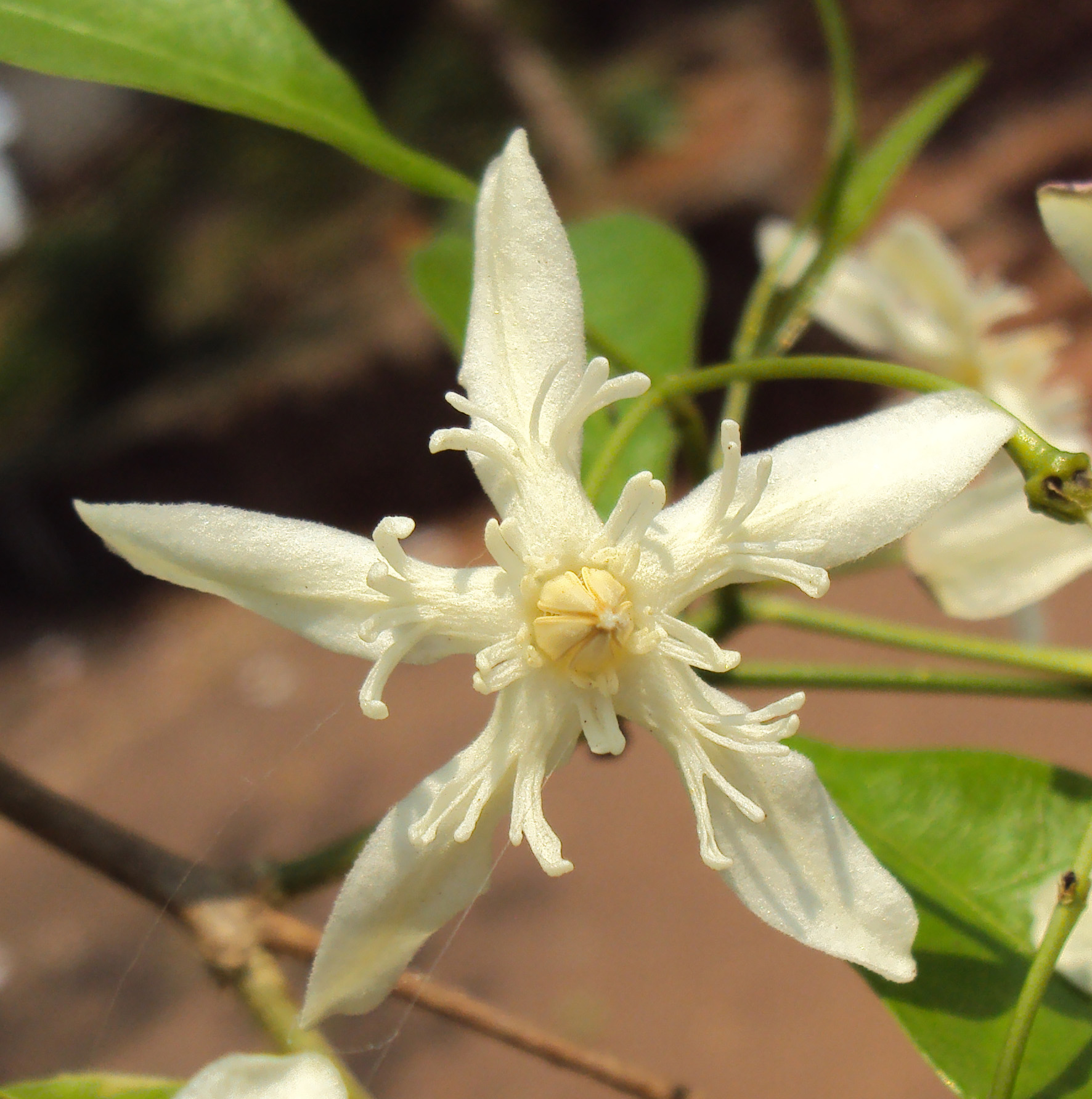
Wrightia tinctoria single flower

=== Fruits ===
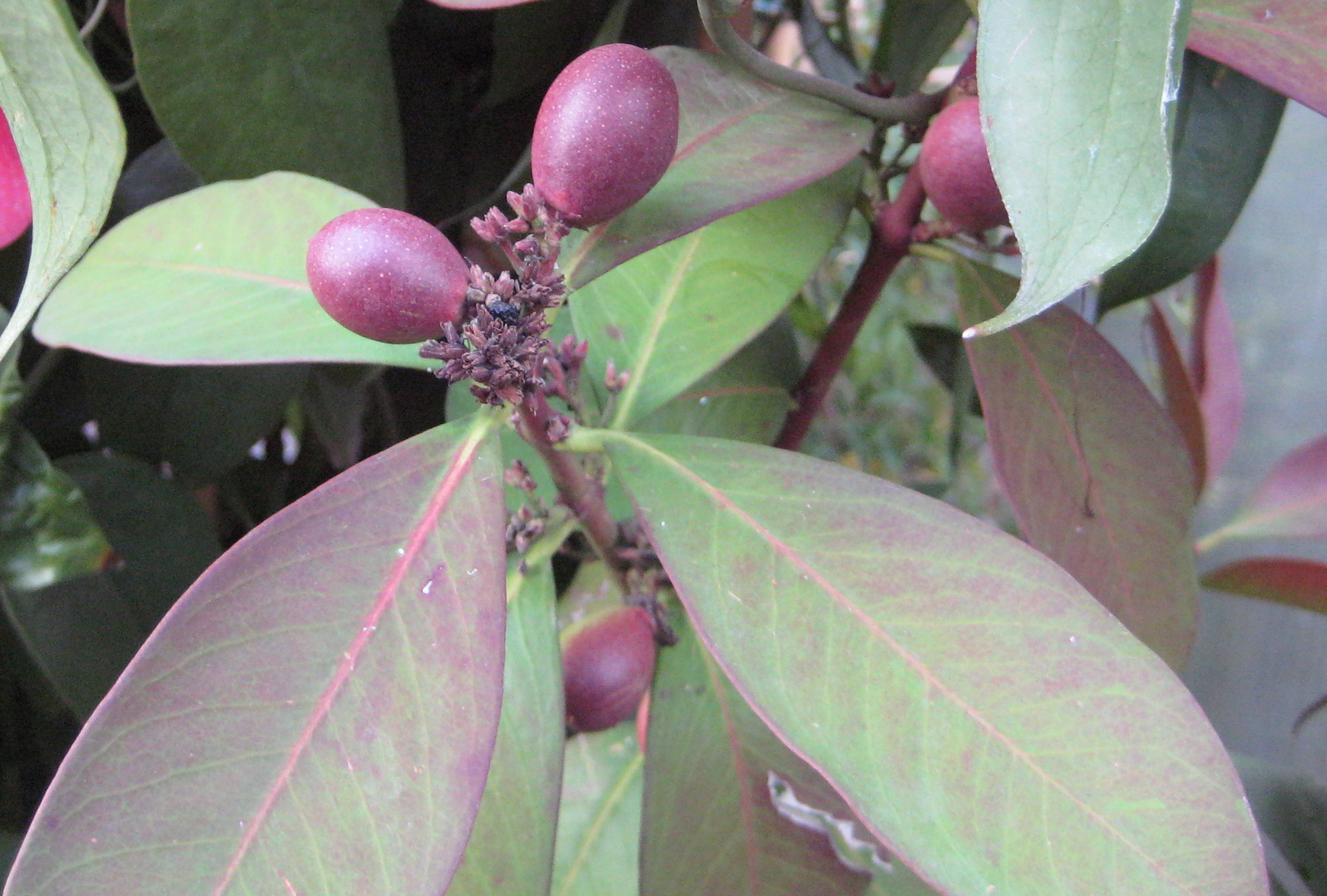
Acokanthera oblongifolia

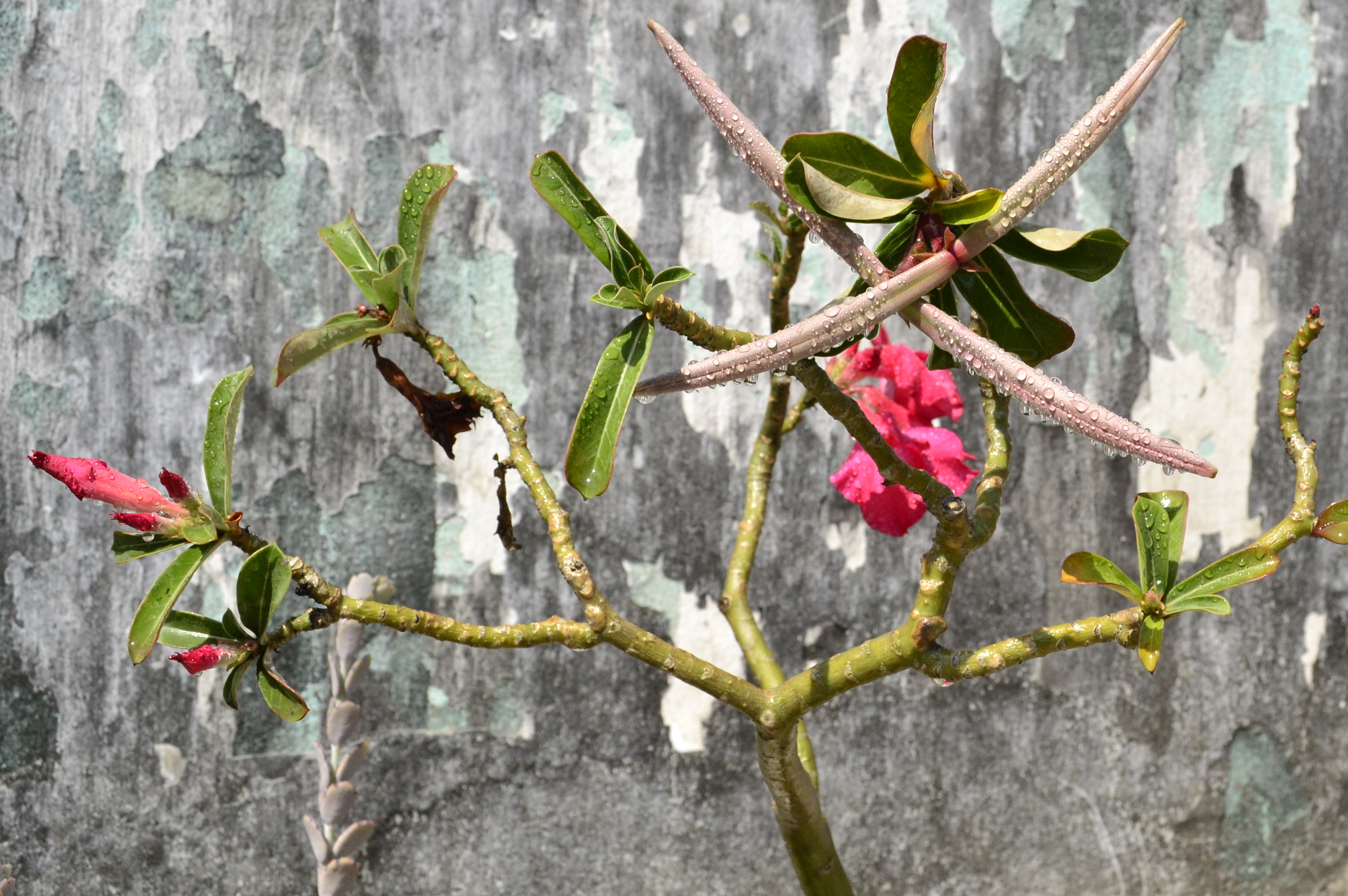
Adenium obesum

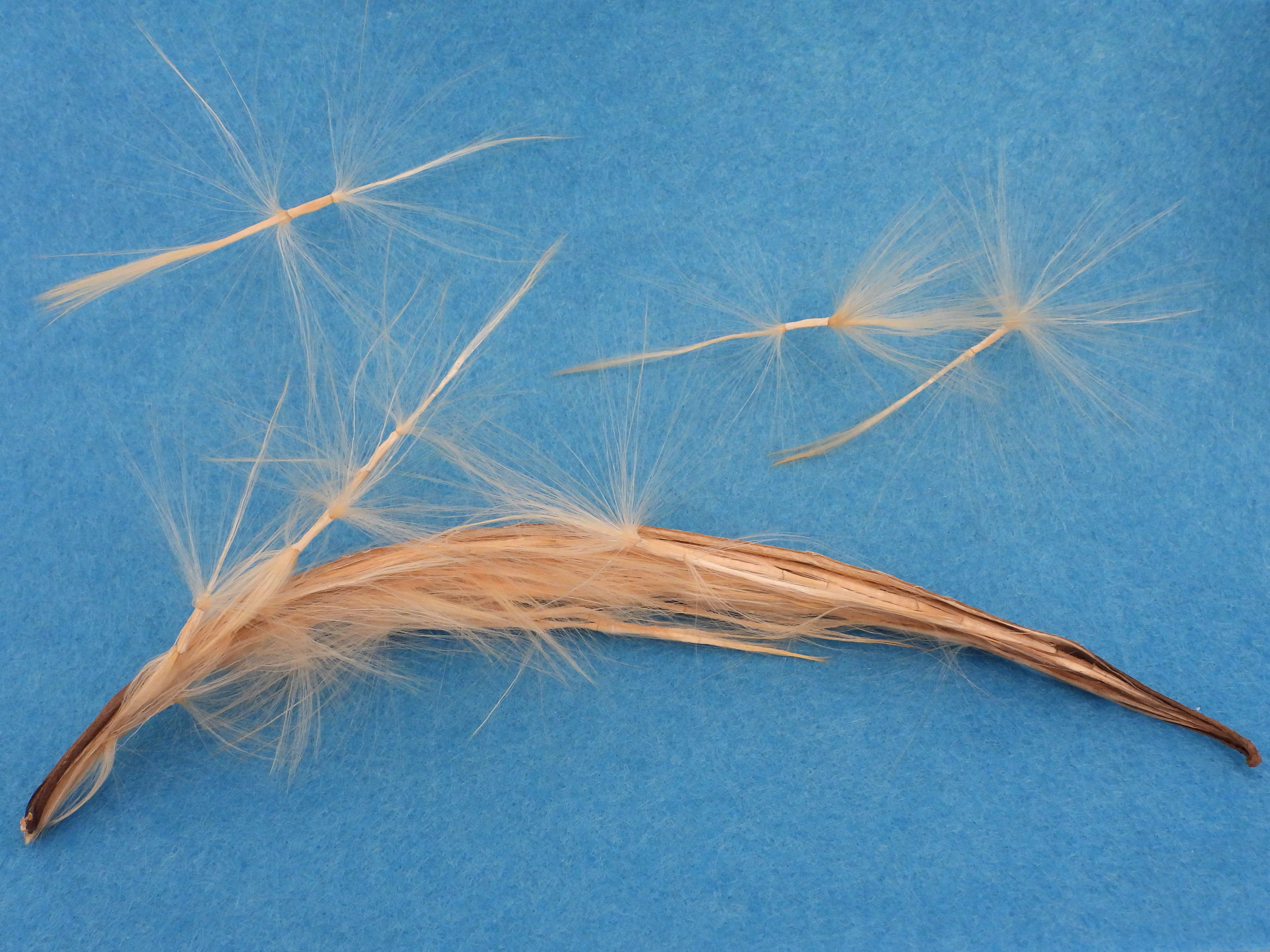
Adenium obesum dehiscence of single fruit.

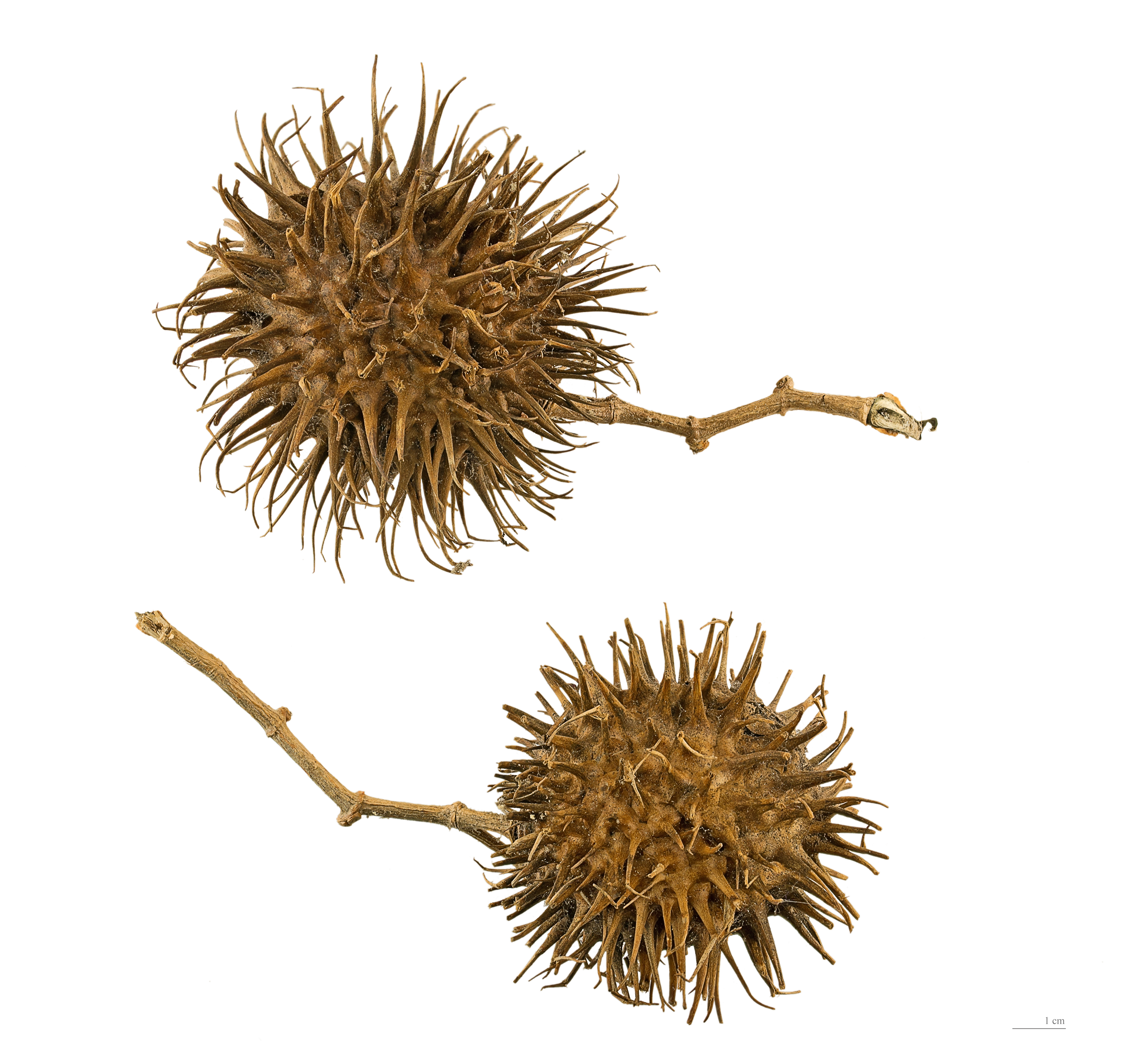
Allamanda cathartica

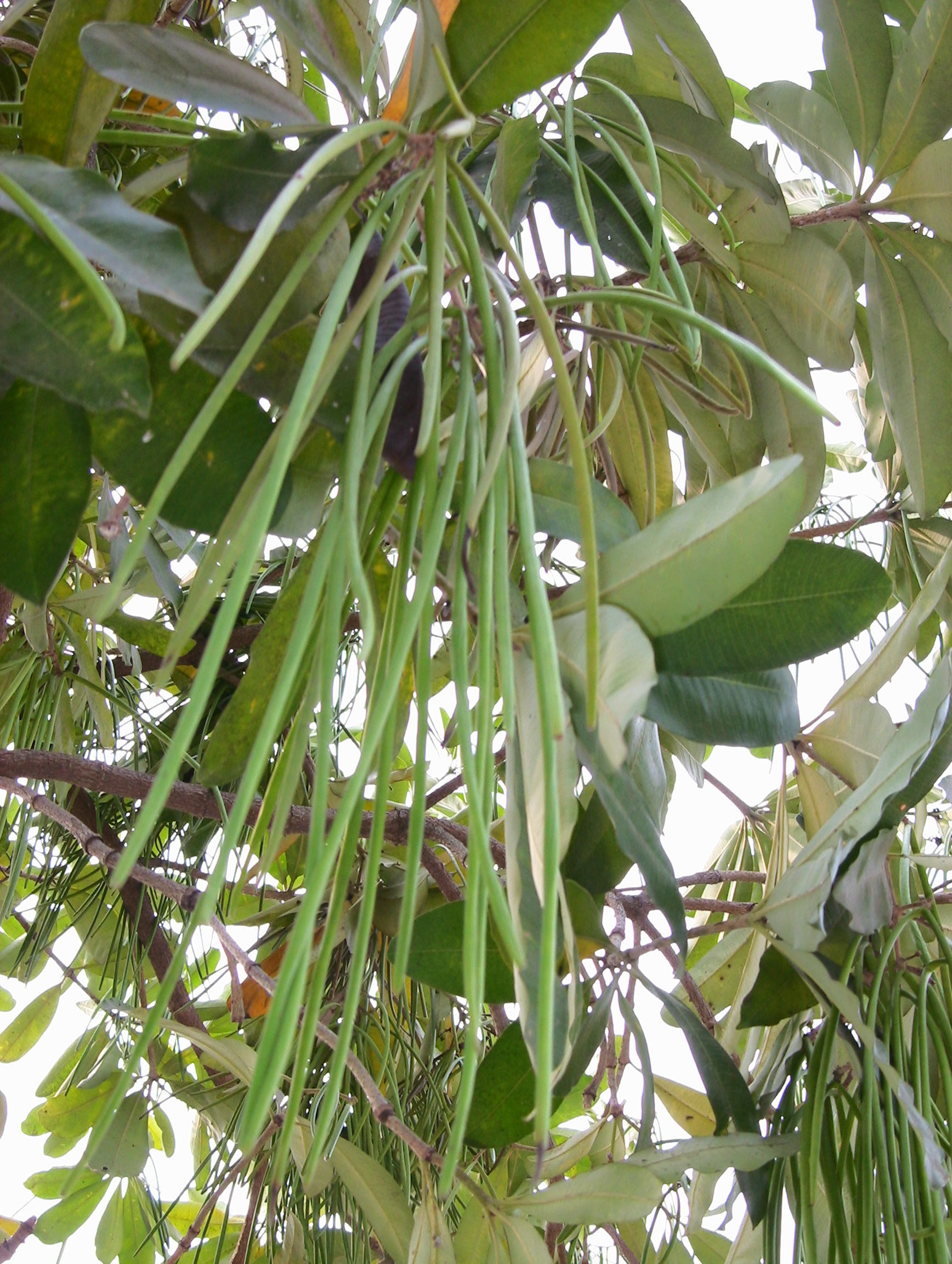
Alstonia scholaris

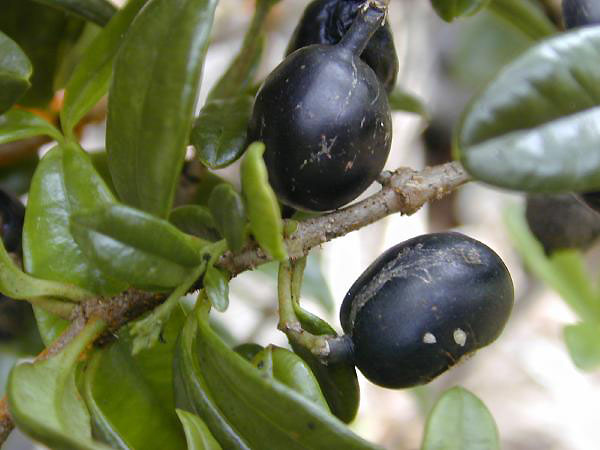
Alyxia oliviformis

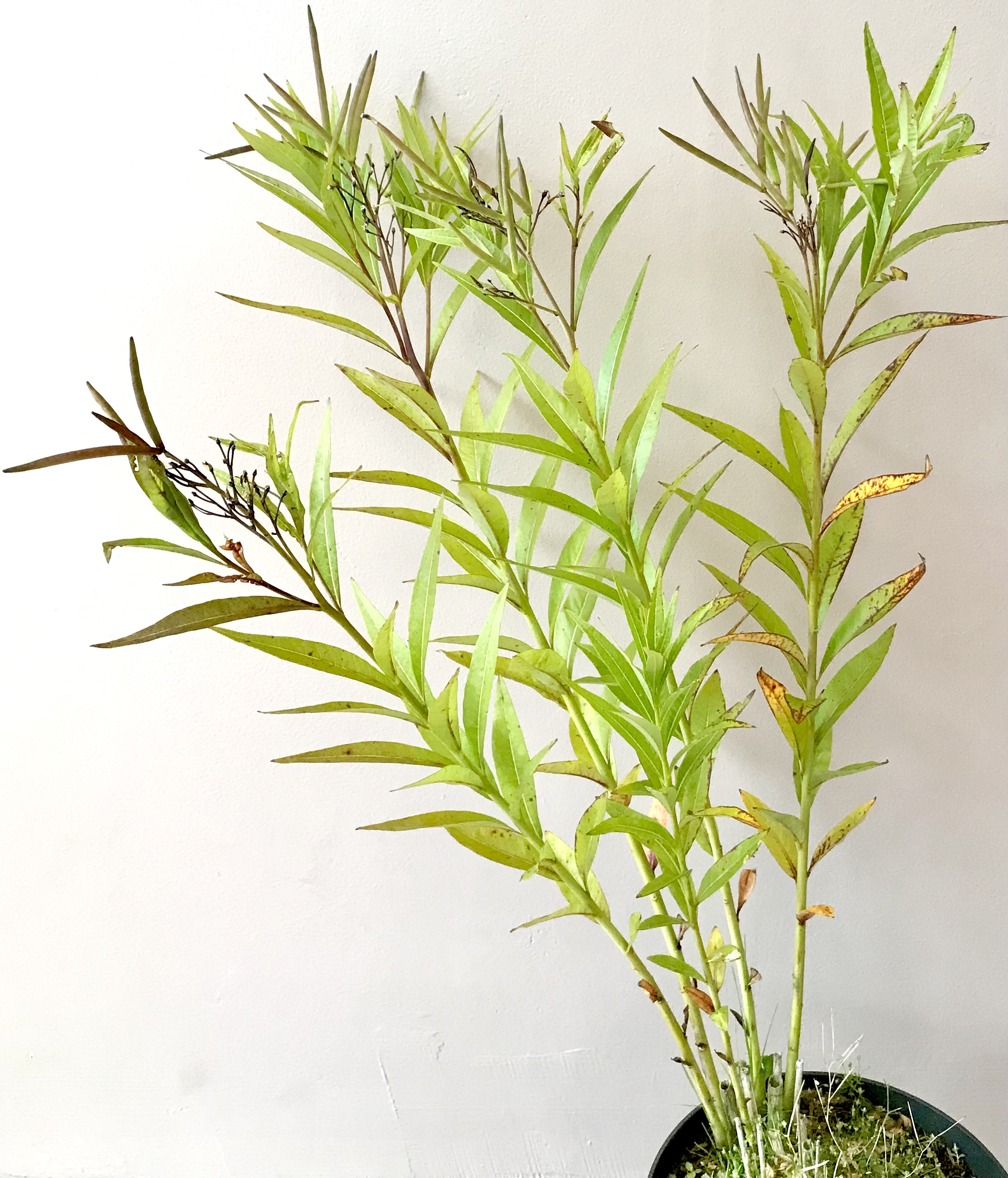
Amsonia tabernaemontana containerised specimen in fruit

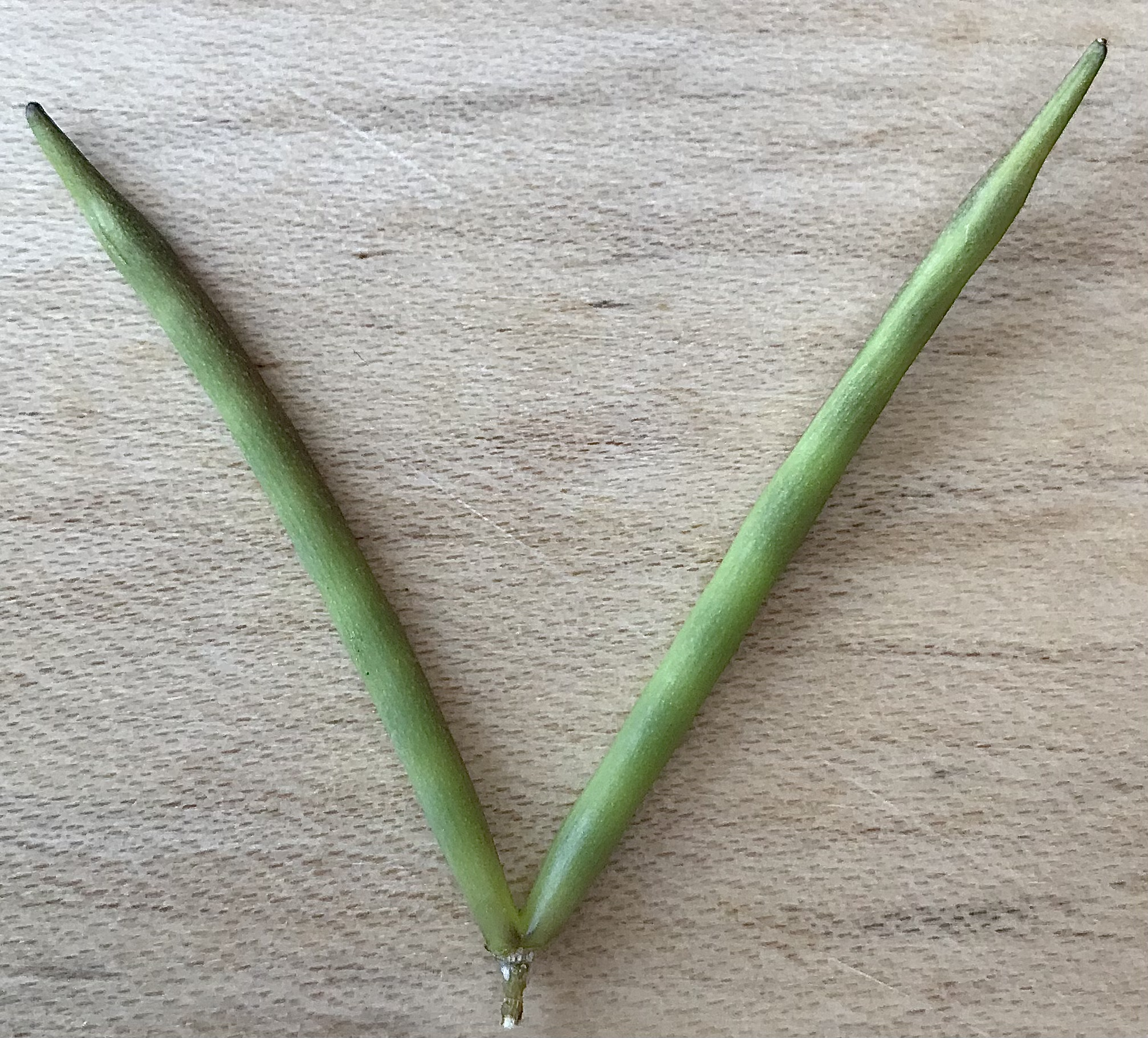
Amsonia tabernaemontana single paired follicle detached from plant (paler, unsunned side)

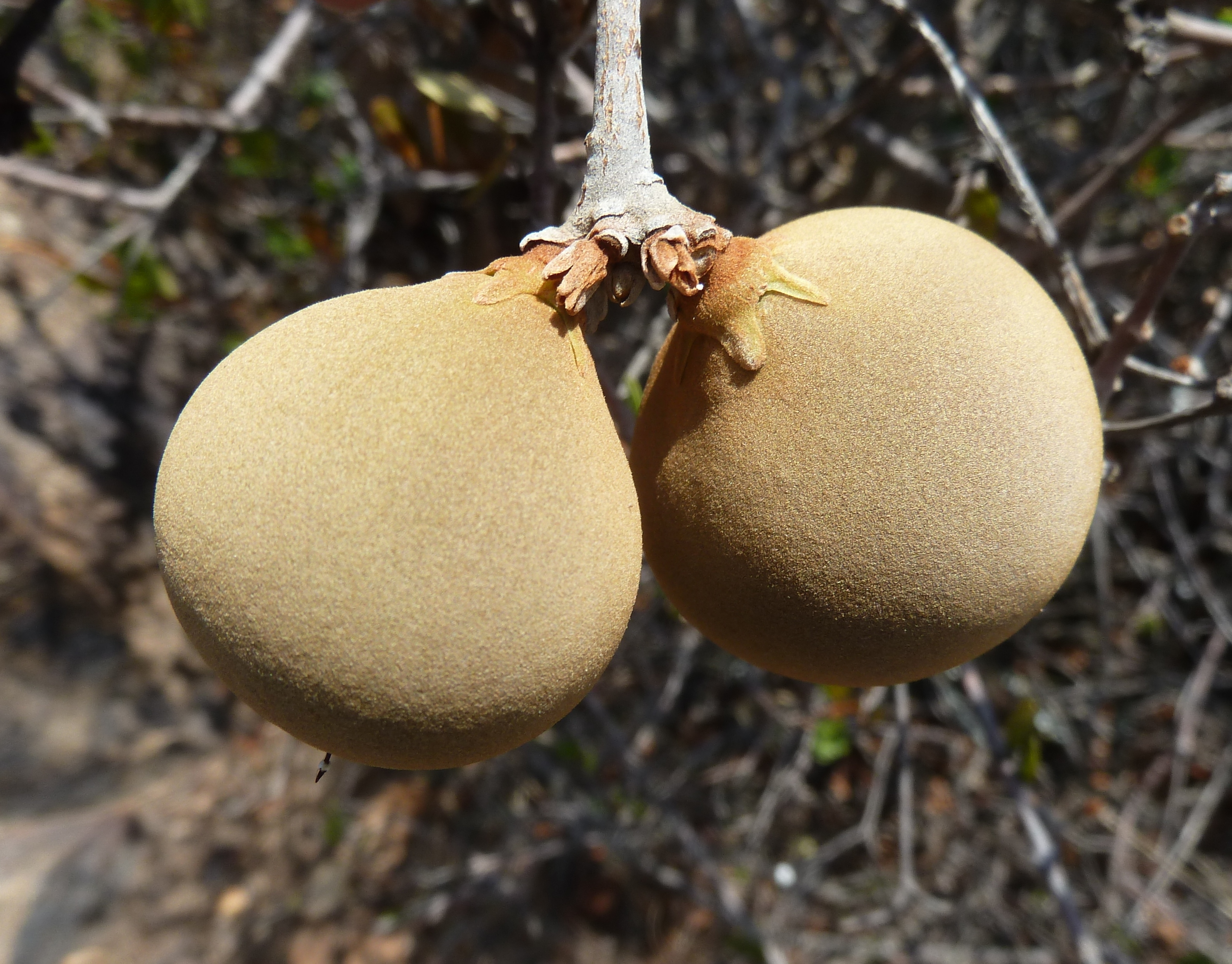
Ancylobothrys capensis

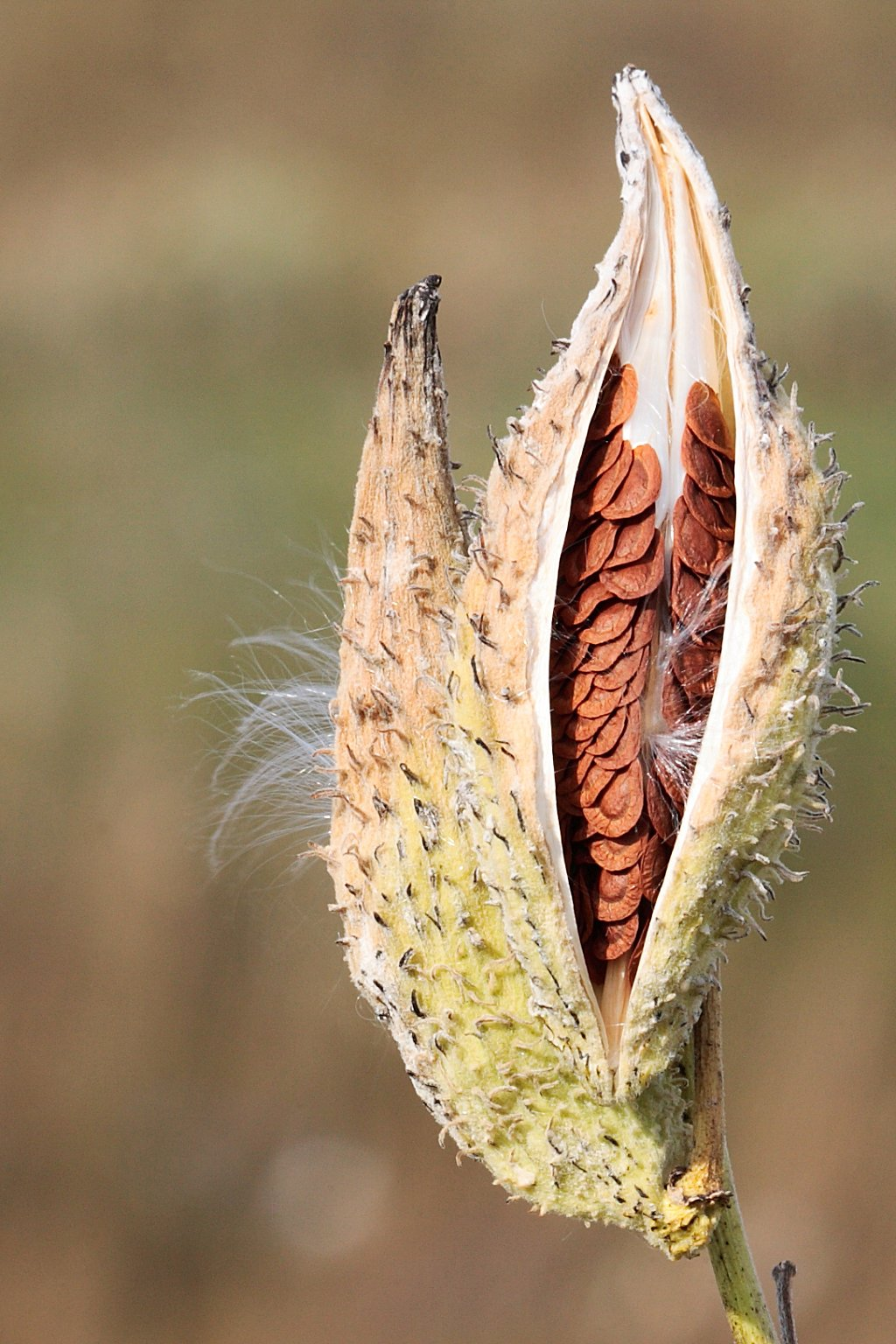
Asclepias syriaca dehiscent follicles (before unfurling of pappi)

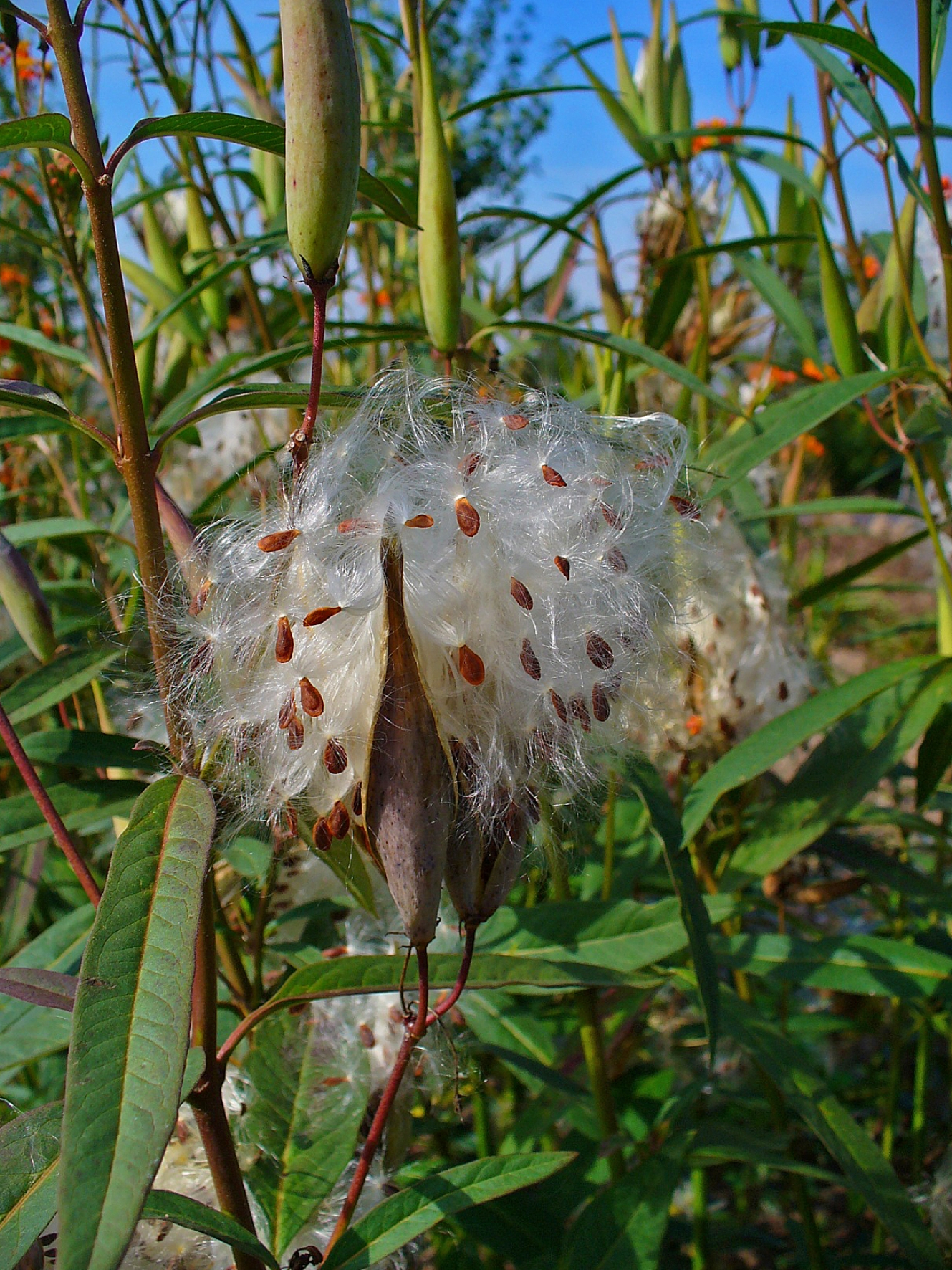
Asclepias curassavica dehiscent follicles shedding seeds with unfurled pappi

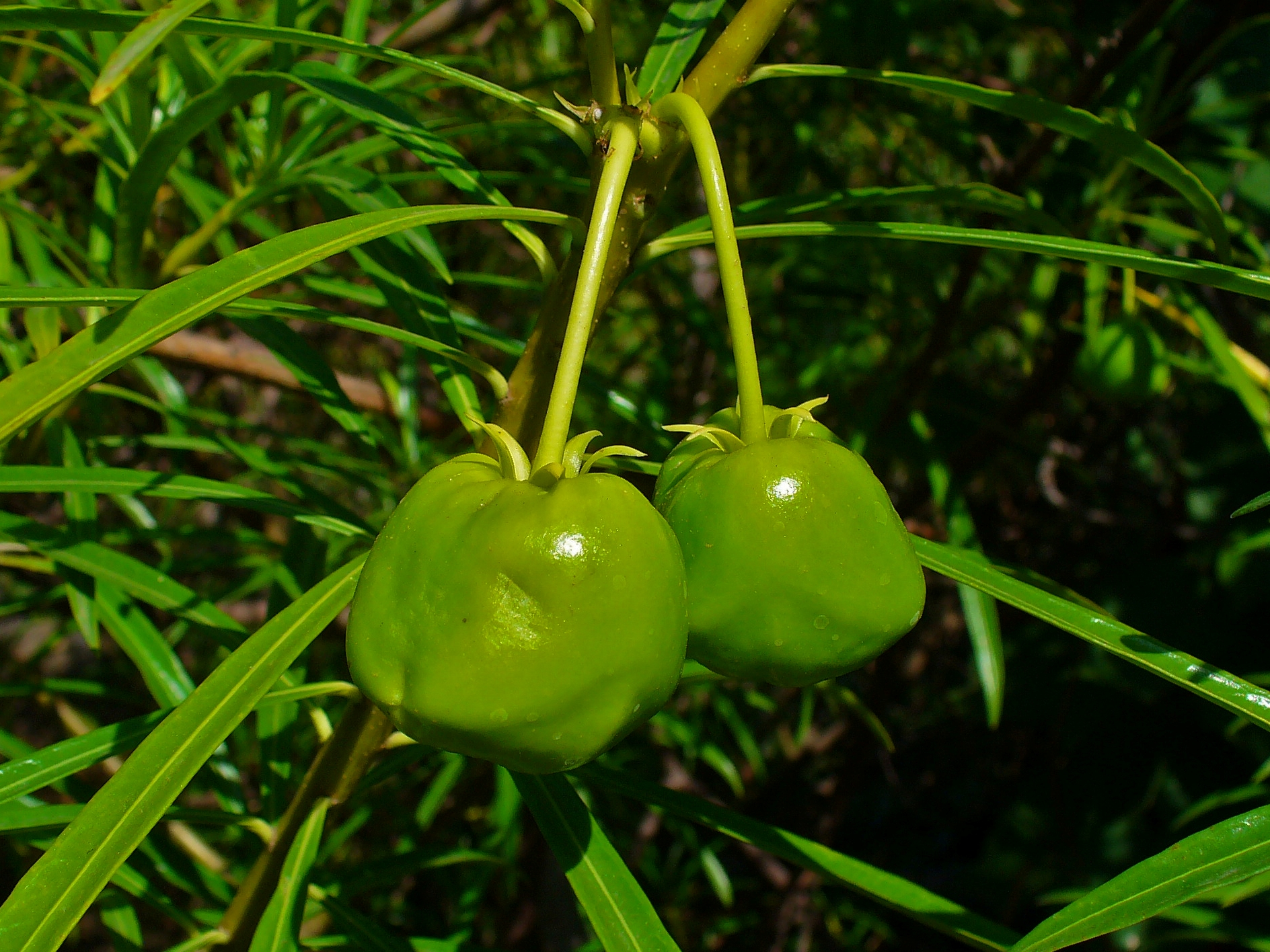
Cascabela thevetia (syn.Thevetia peruviana)

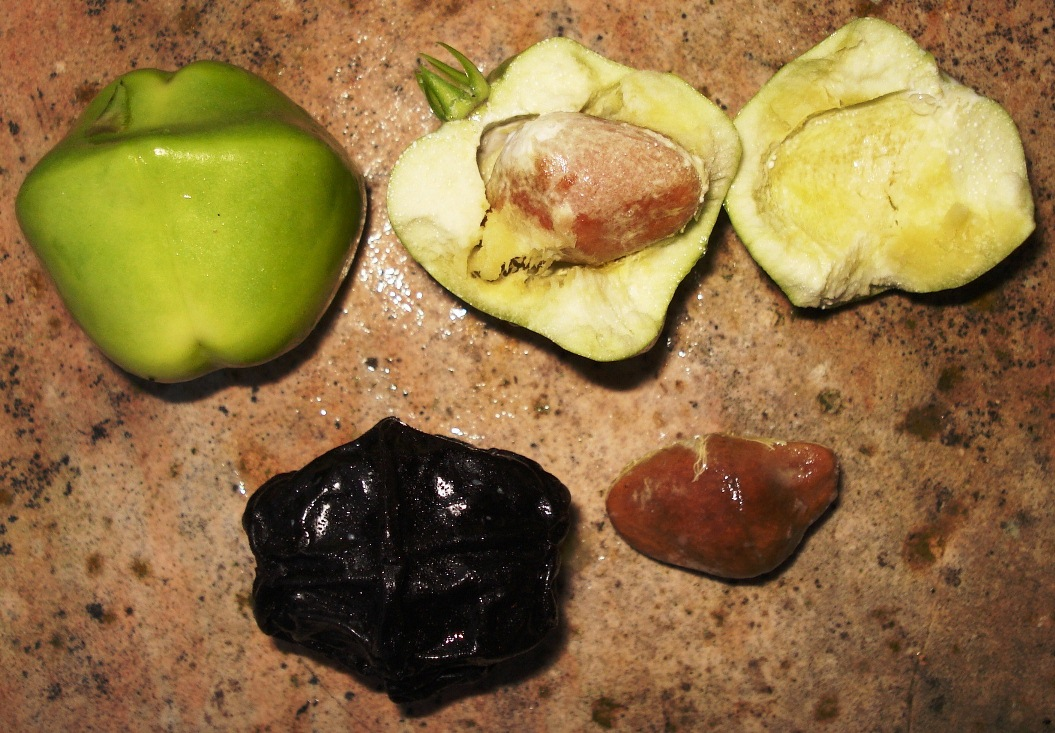
Cascabela thevetia (syn.Thevetia peruviana): dissection of toxic fruits.

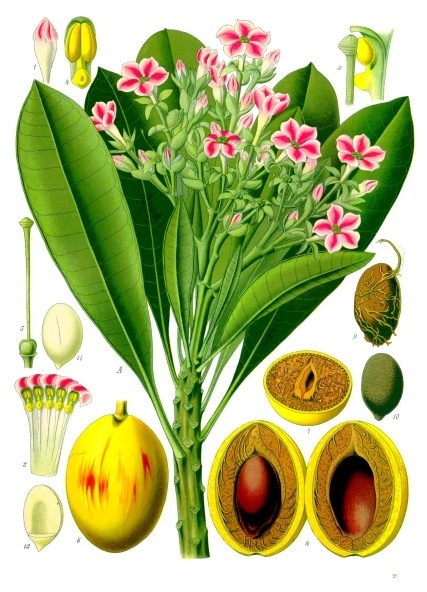
Cerbera manghas

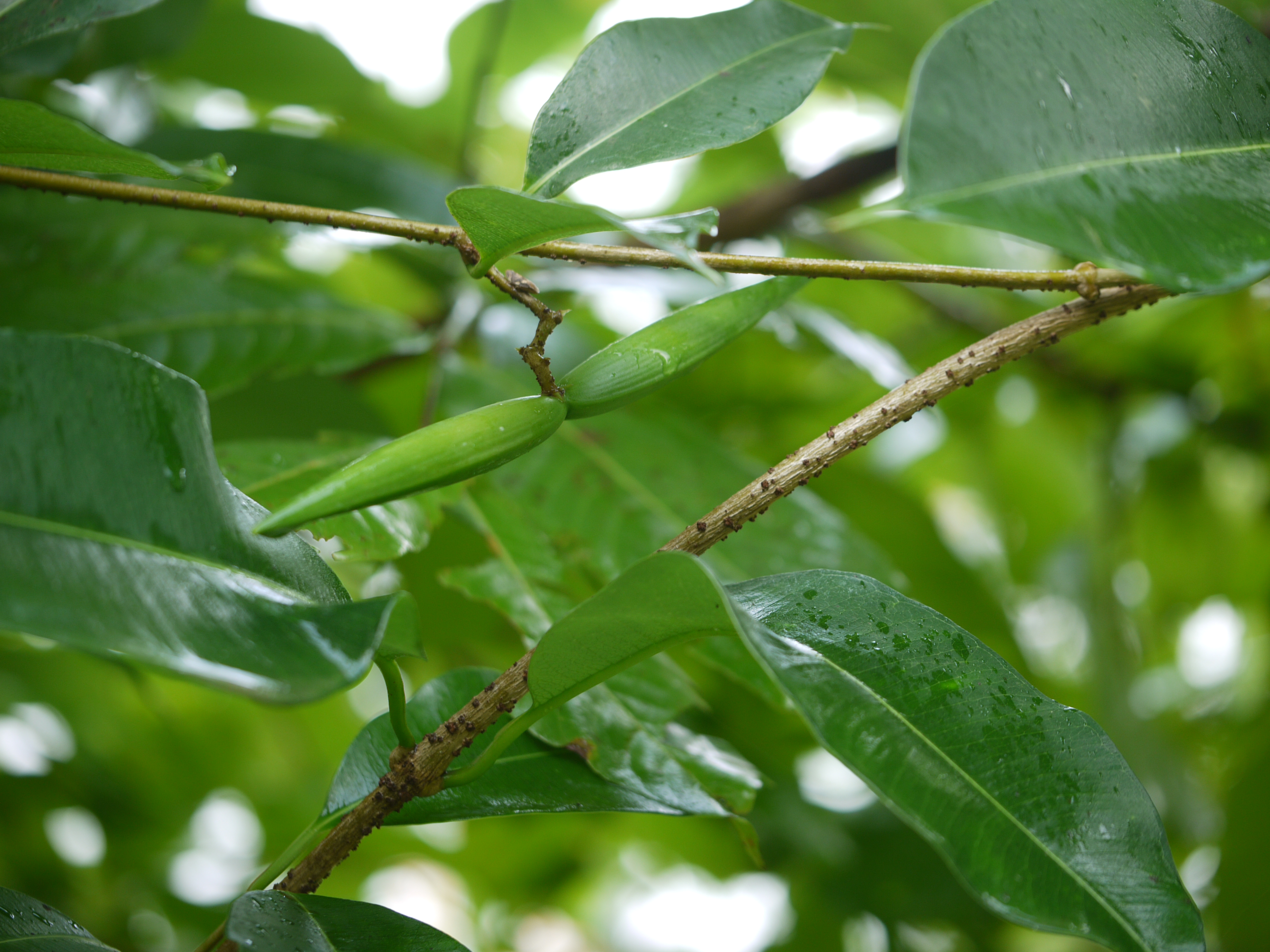
Cryptolepis dubia

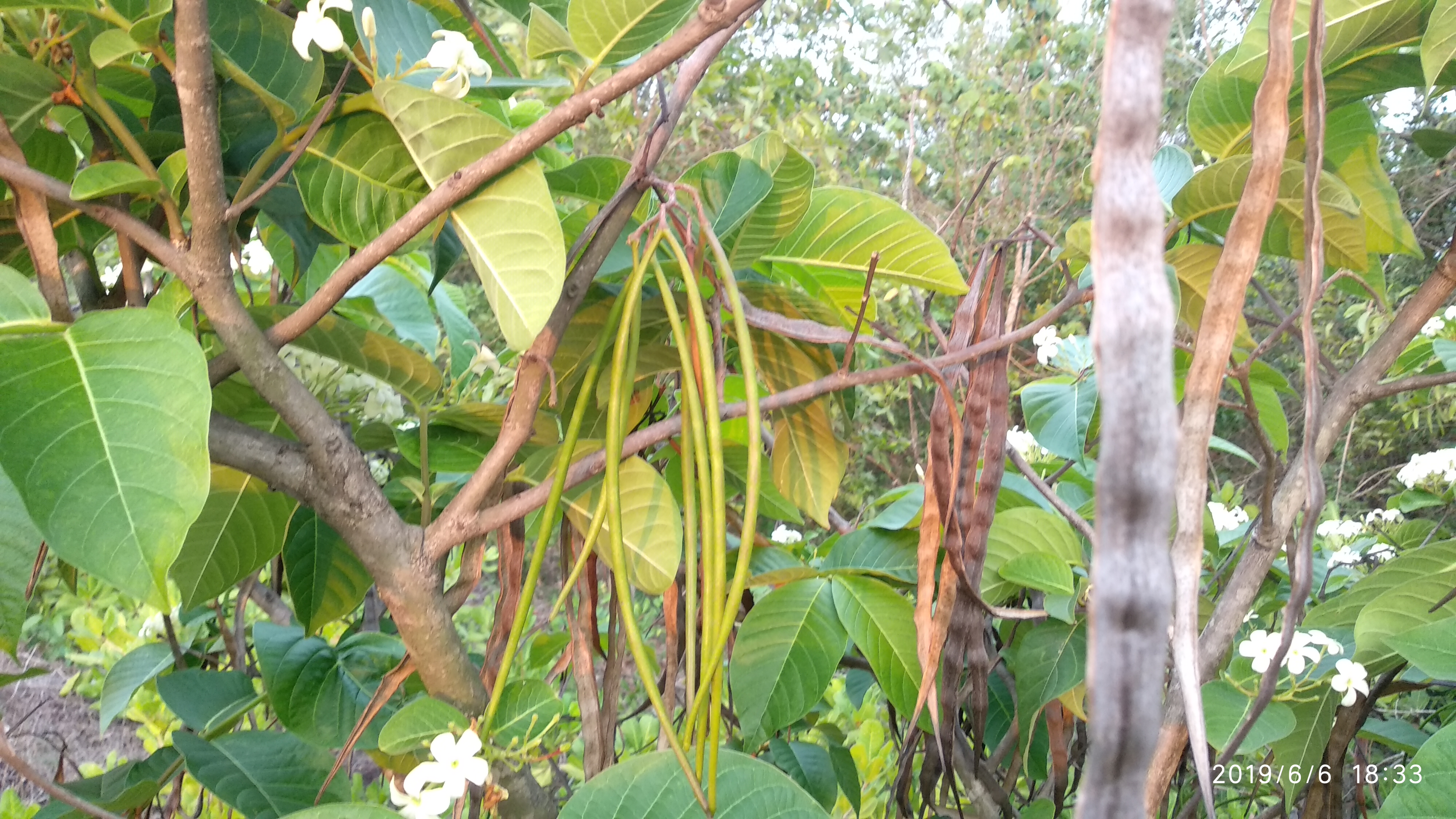
Holarrhena pubescens

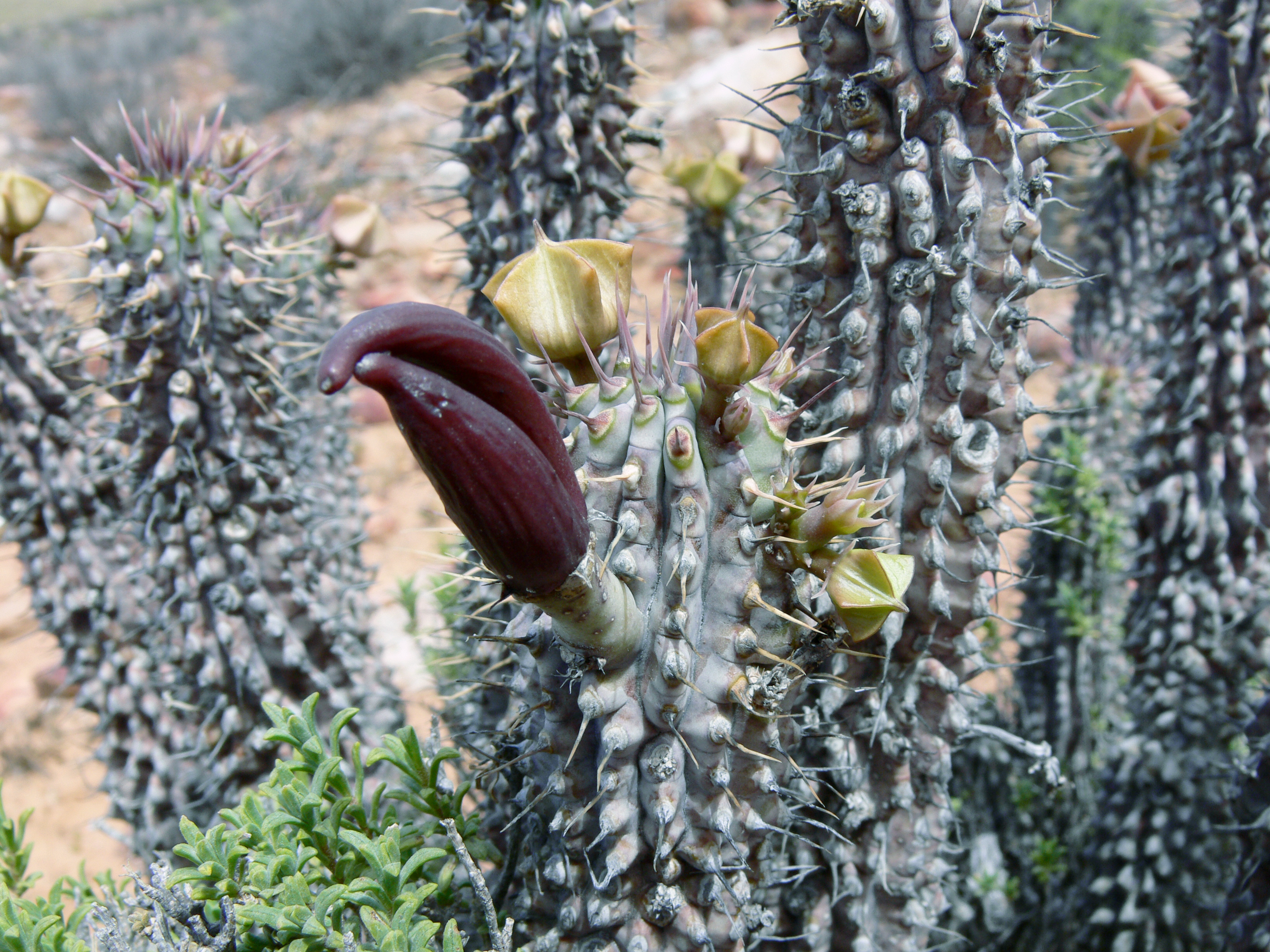
Hoodia gordoniI

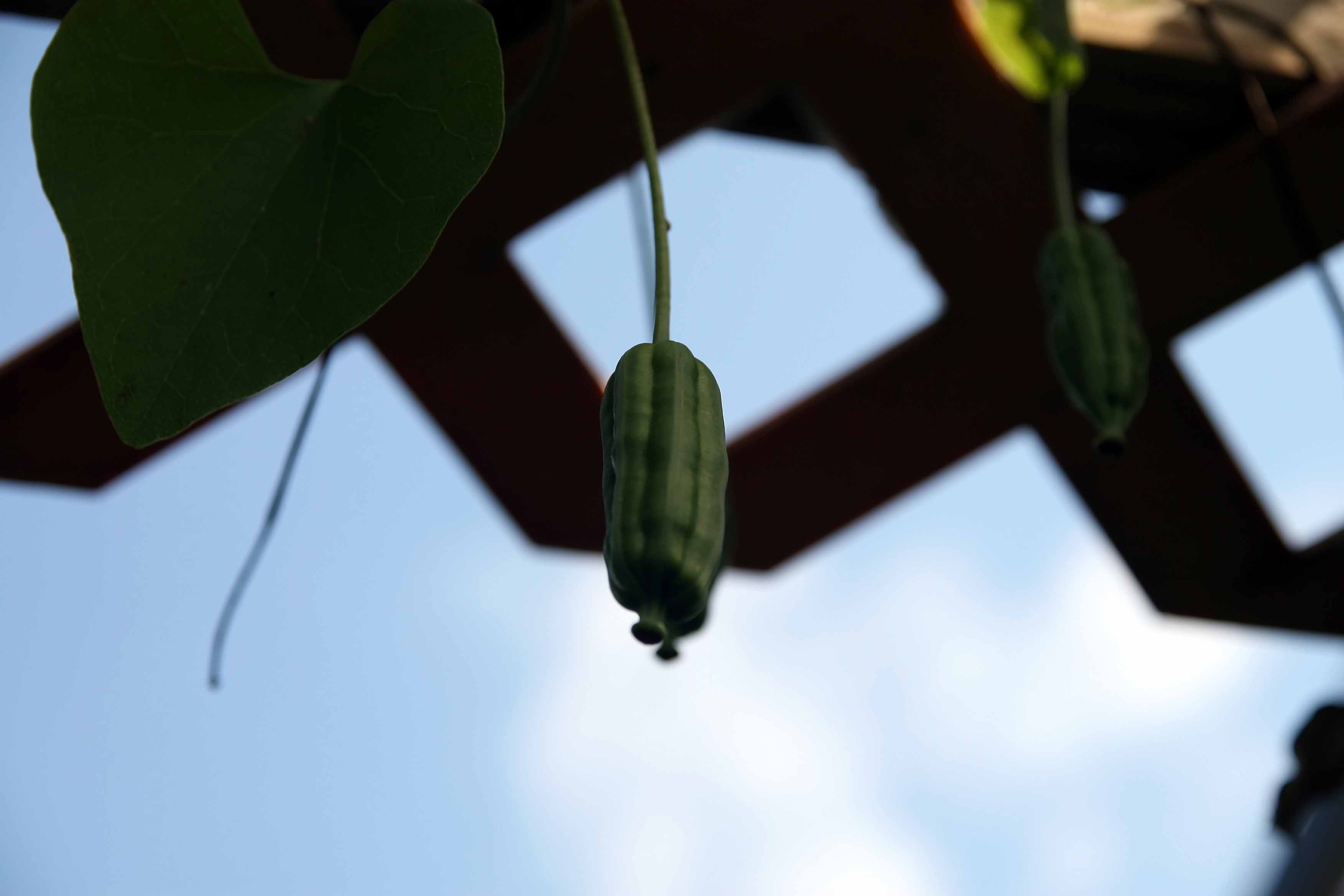
Mandevilla boliviensis

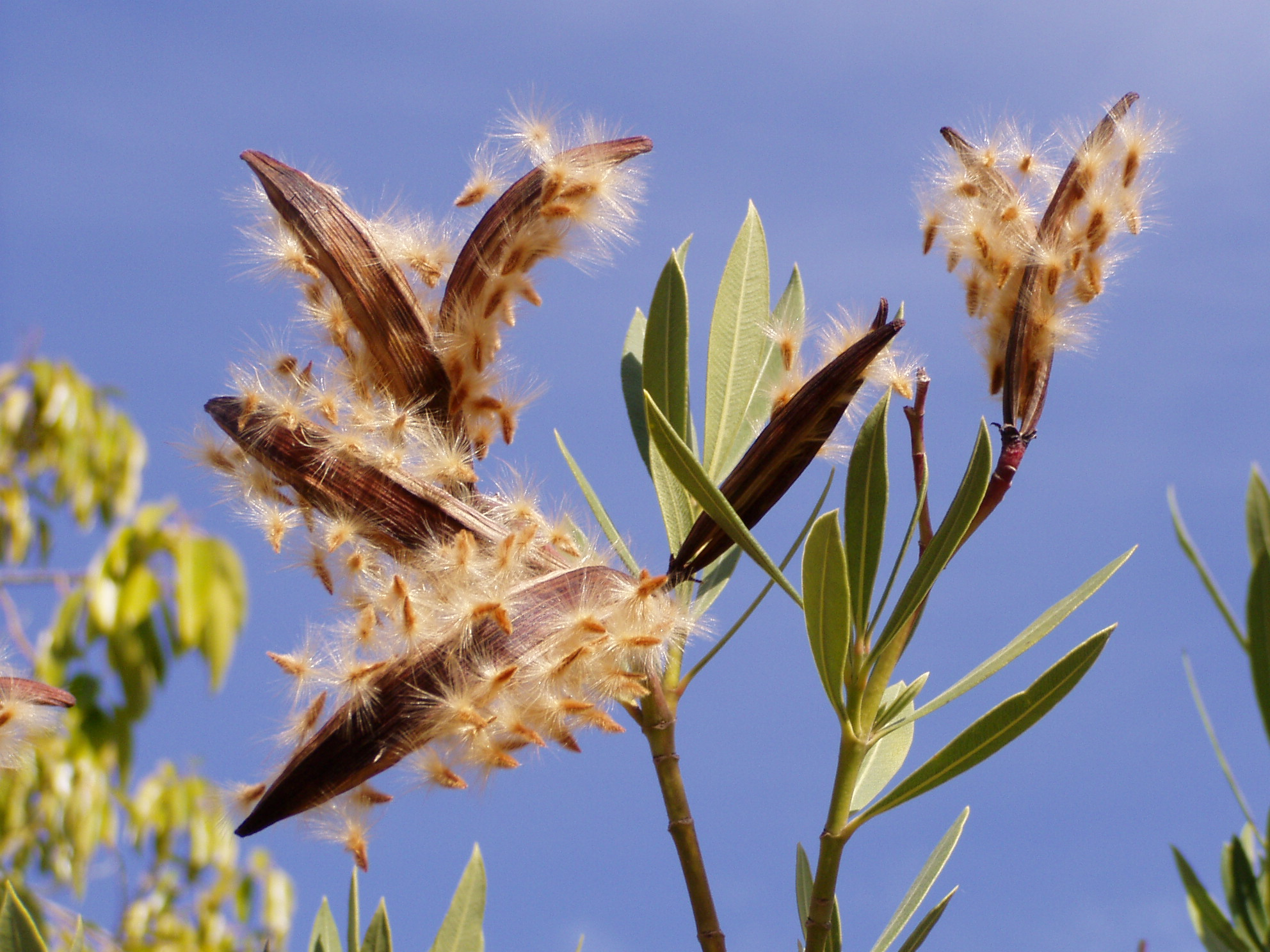
Nerium oleander (dehiscence)

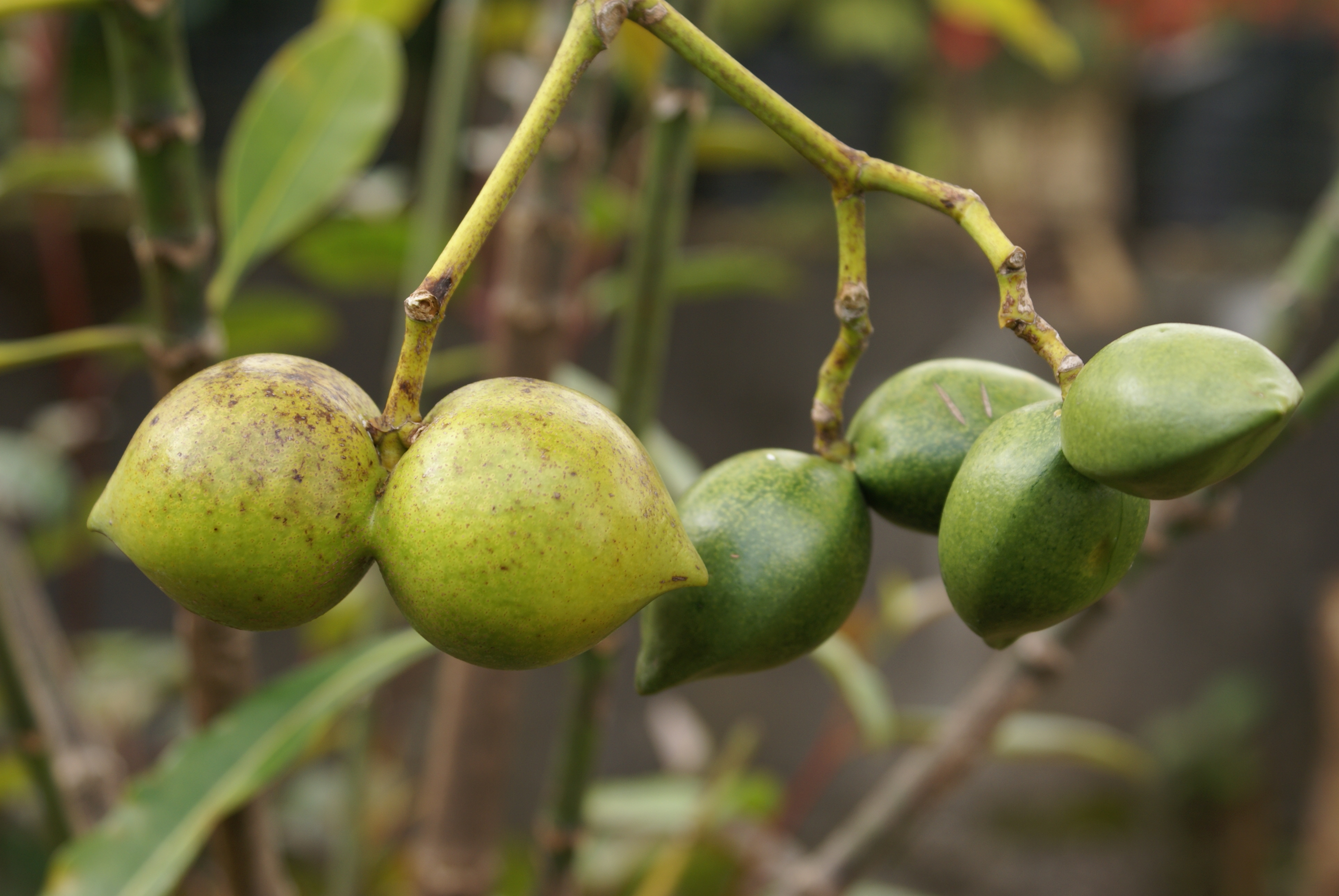
Ochrosia borbonica

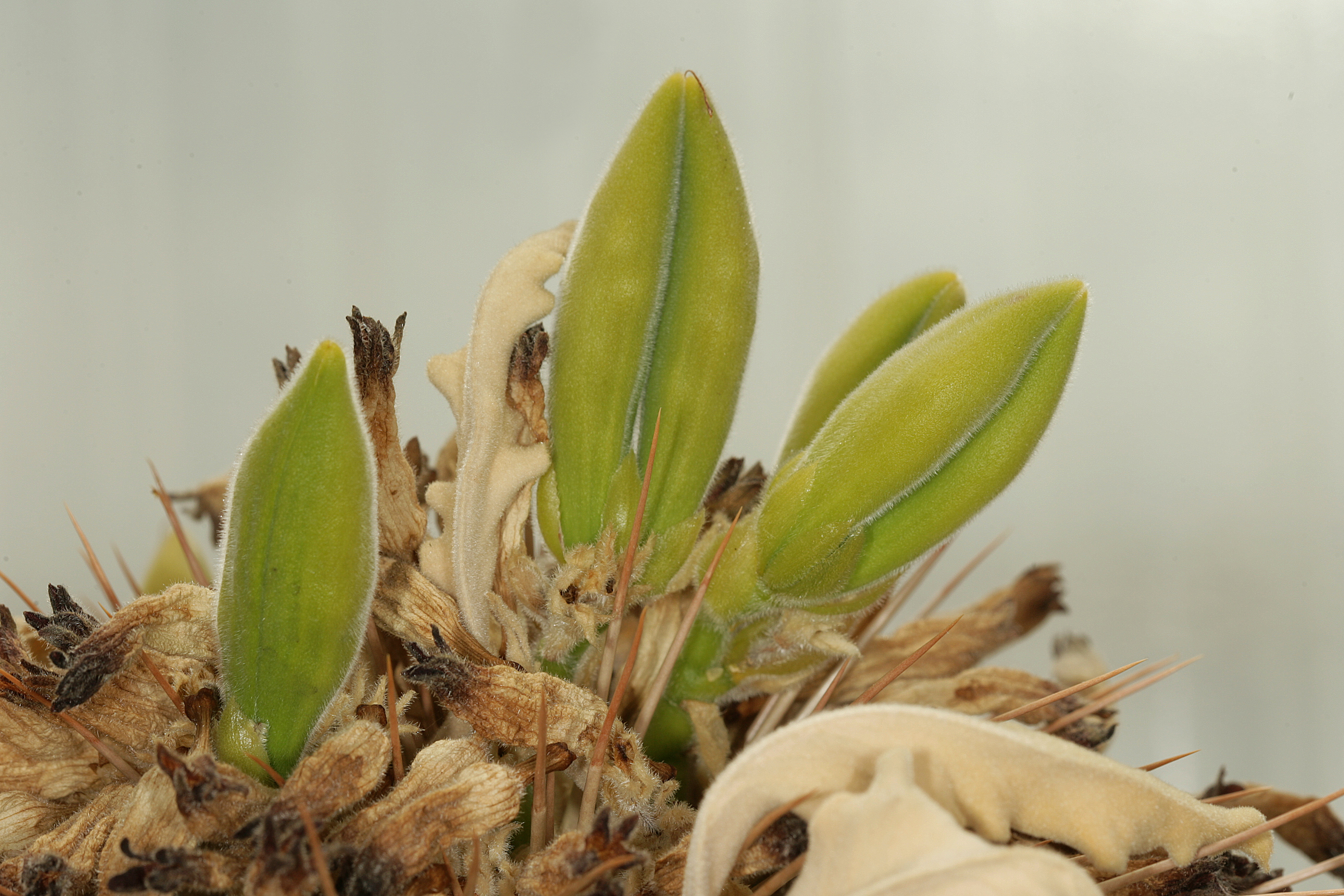
Pachypodium namaquanum

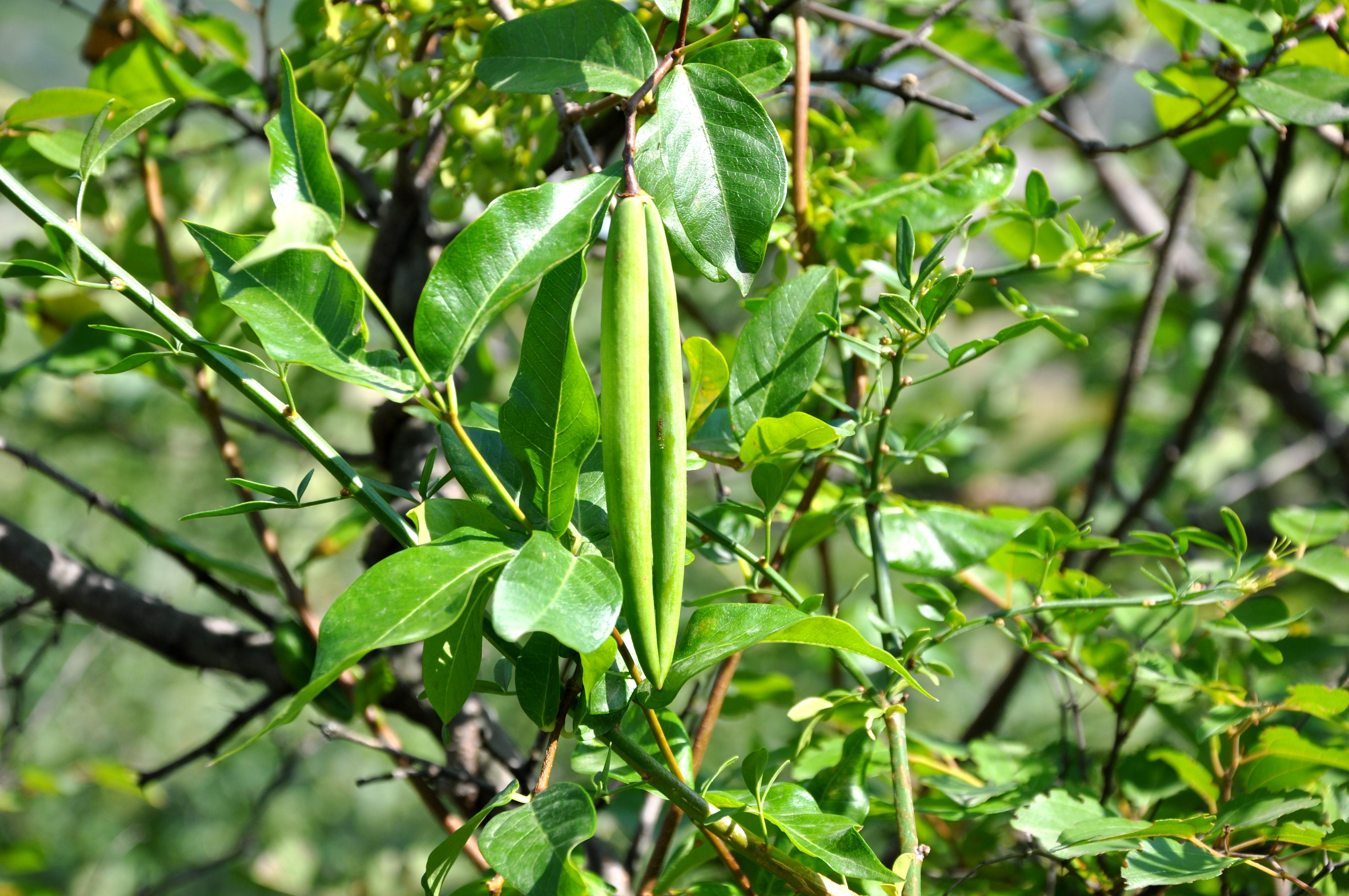
Periploca graeca

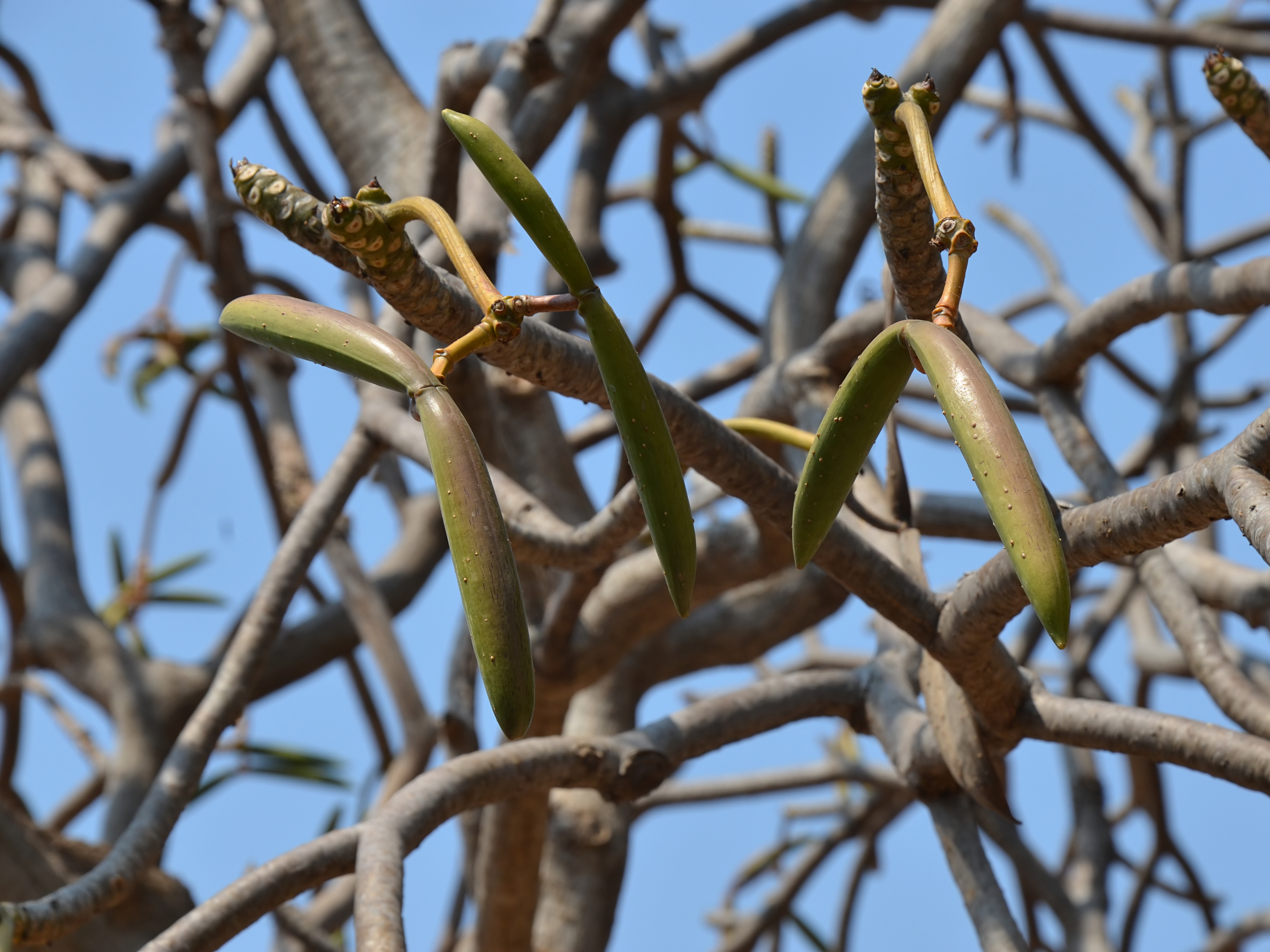
Plumeria alba

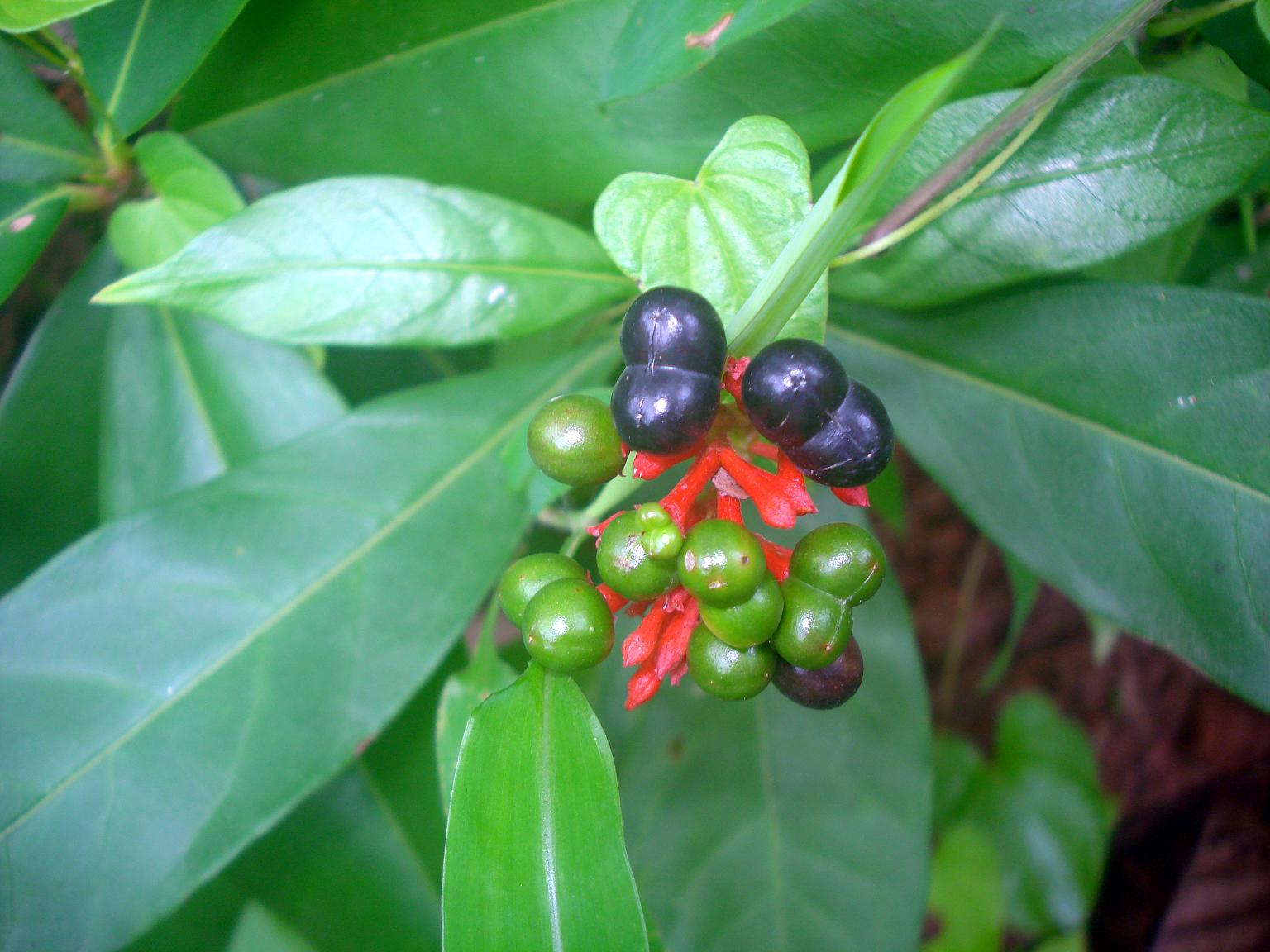
Rauvolfia serpentina

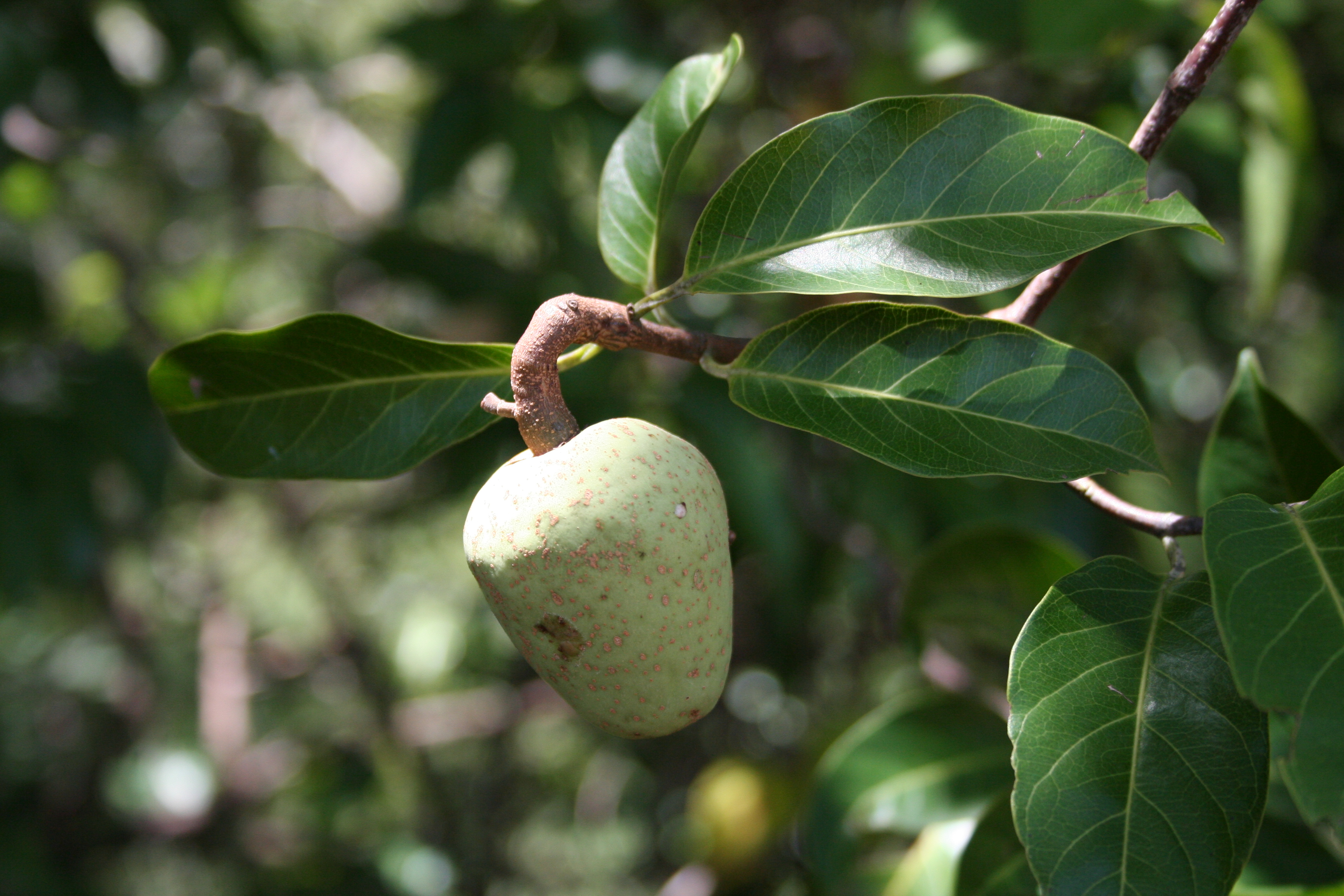
Saba senegalensis unripe fruit

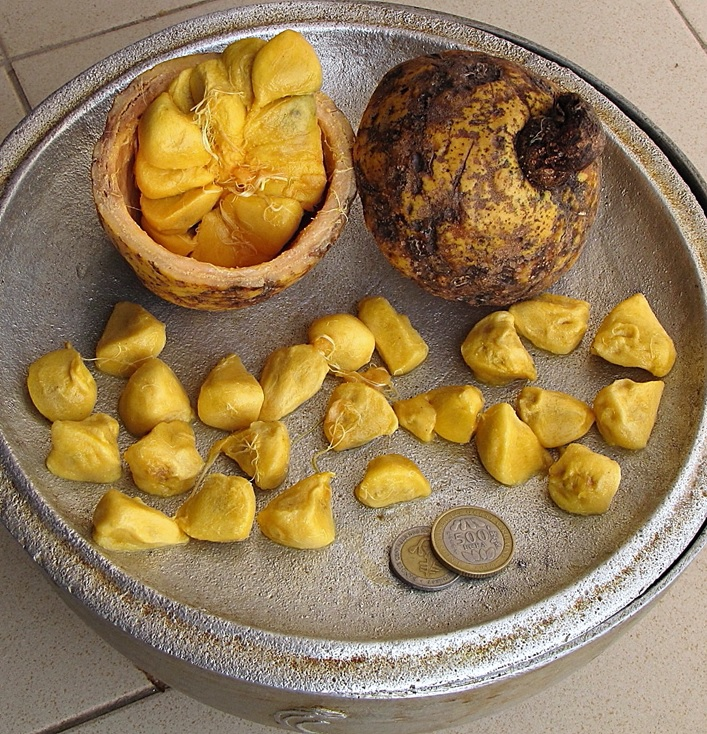
Saba senegalensis: dissection of ripe, edible fruit

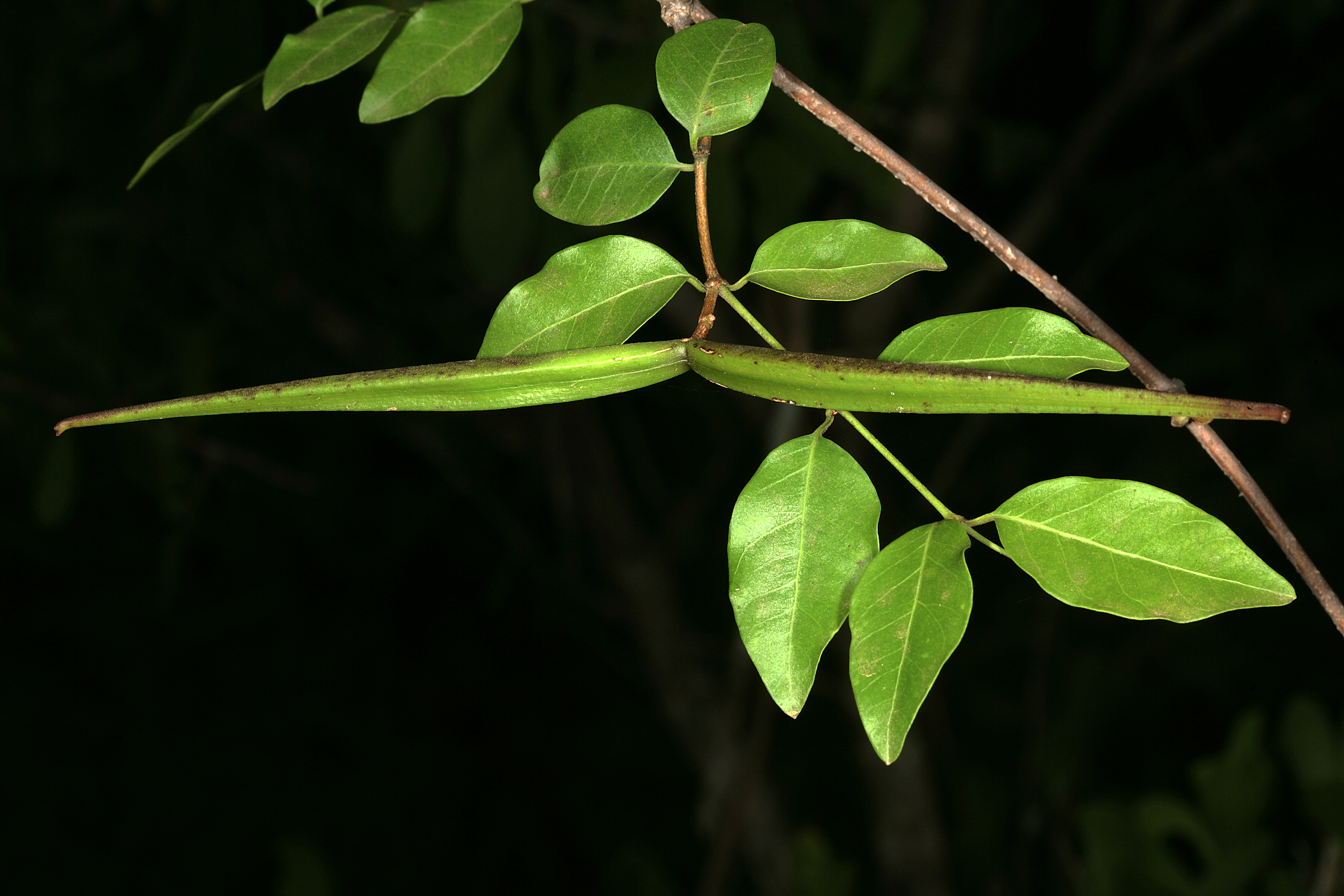
Secamone parvifolia

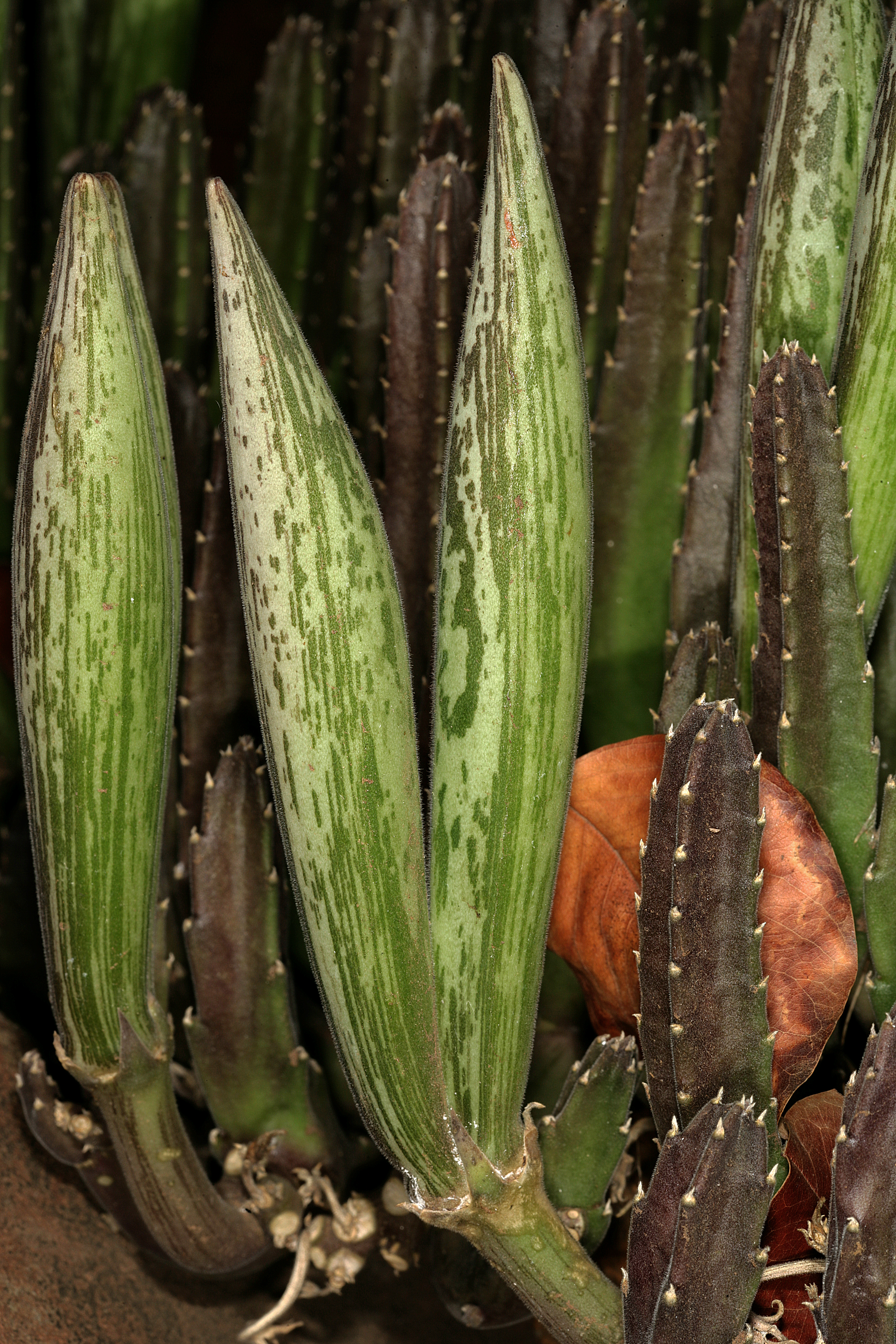
Stapelia gigantea

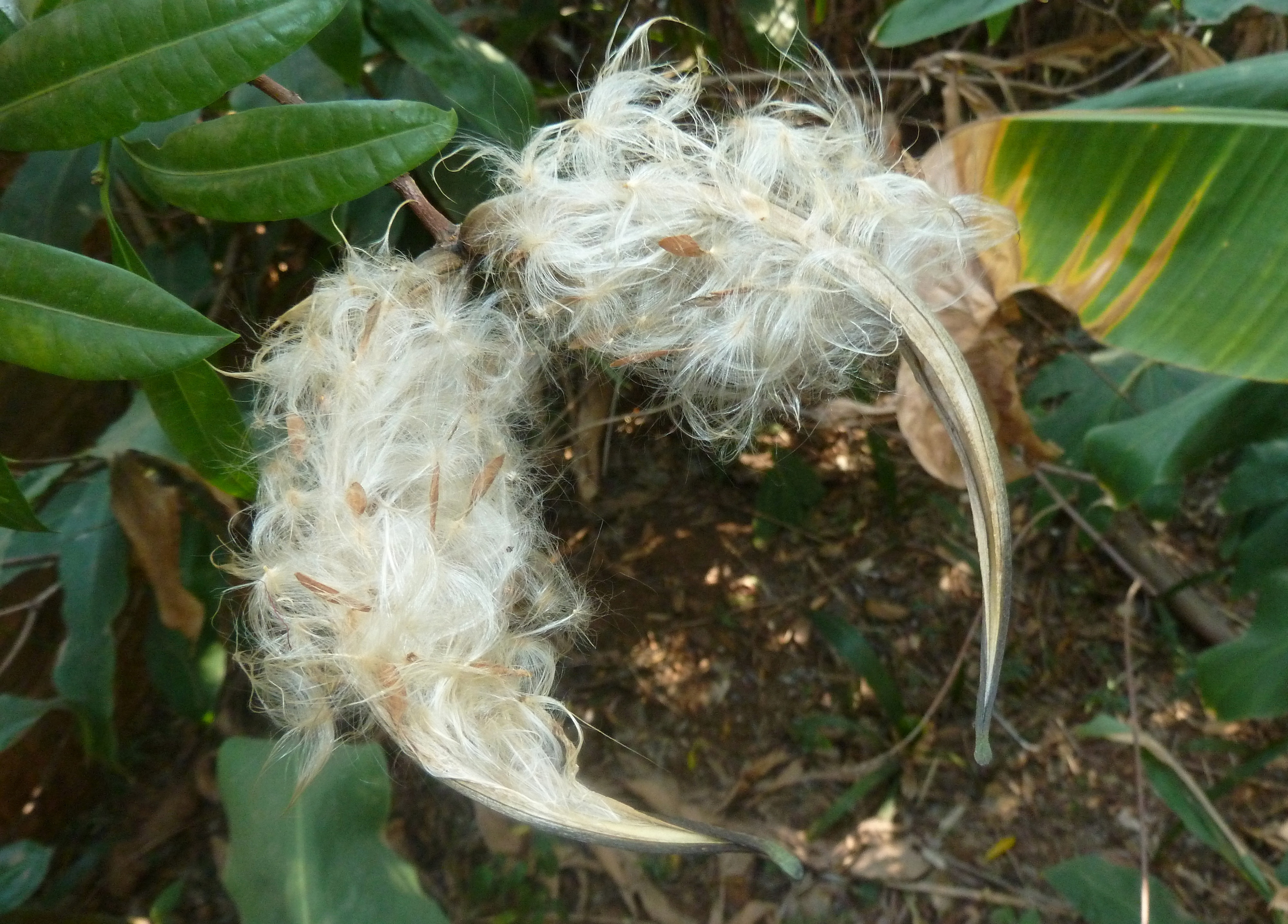
Strophanthus speciosus (dehiscence)

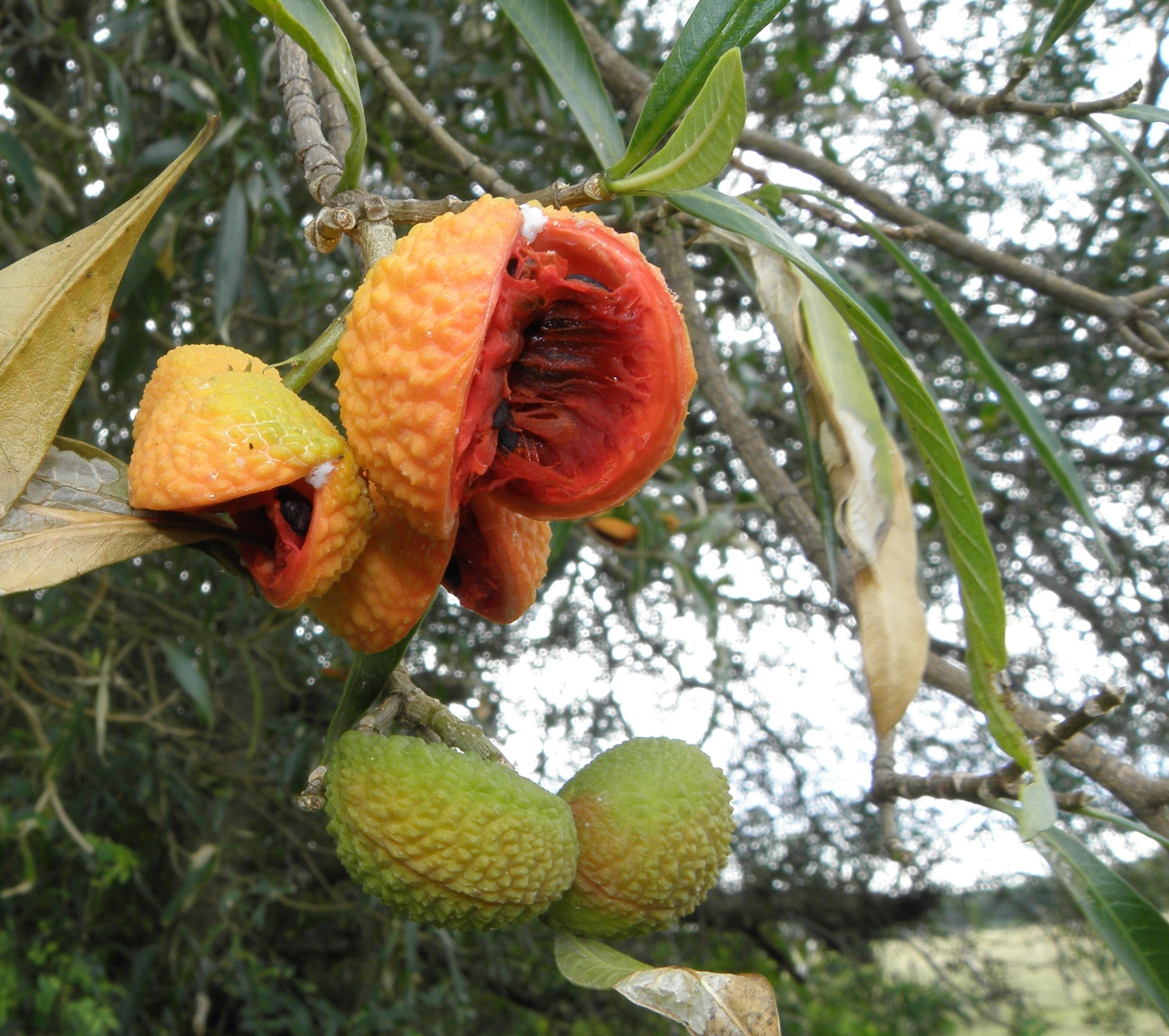
Tabernaemontana catharinensis (dehiscence)

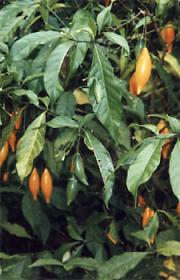
Tabernanthe iboga

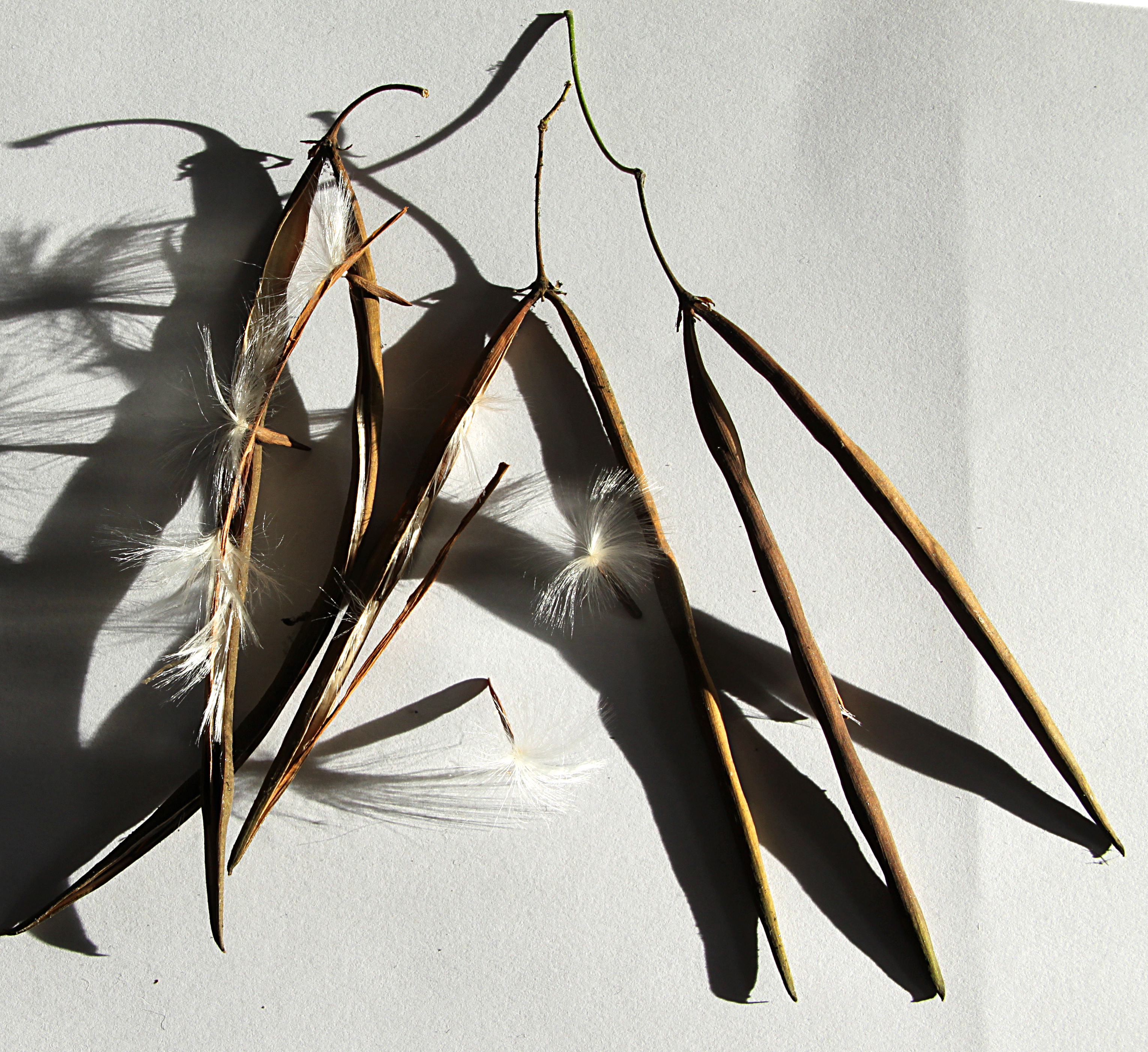
Trachelospermum jasminoides (dehiscence)

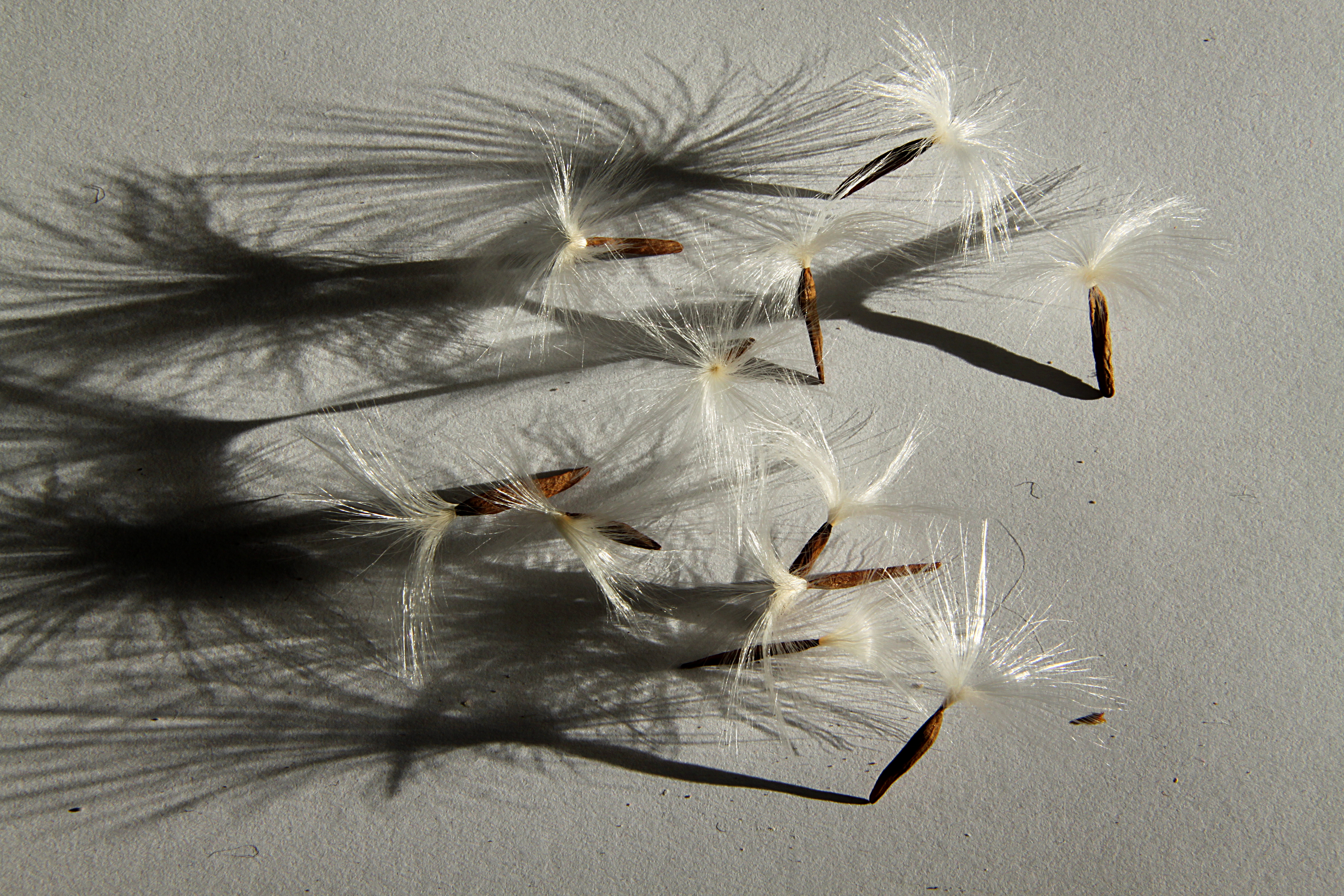
Trachelospermum jasminoides: individual seeds, showing pappus

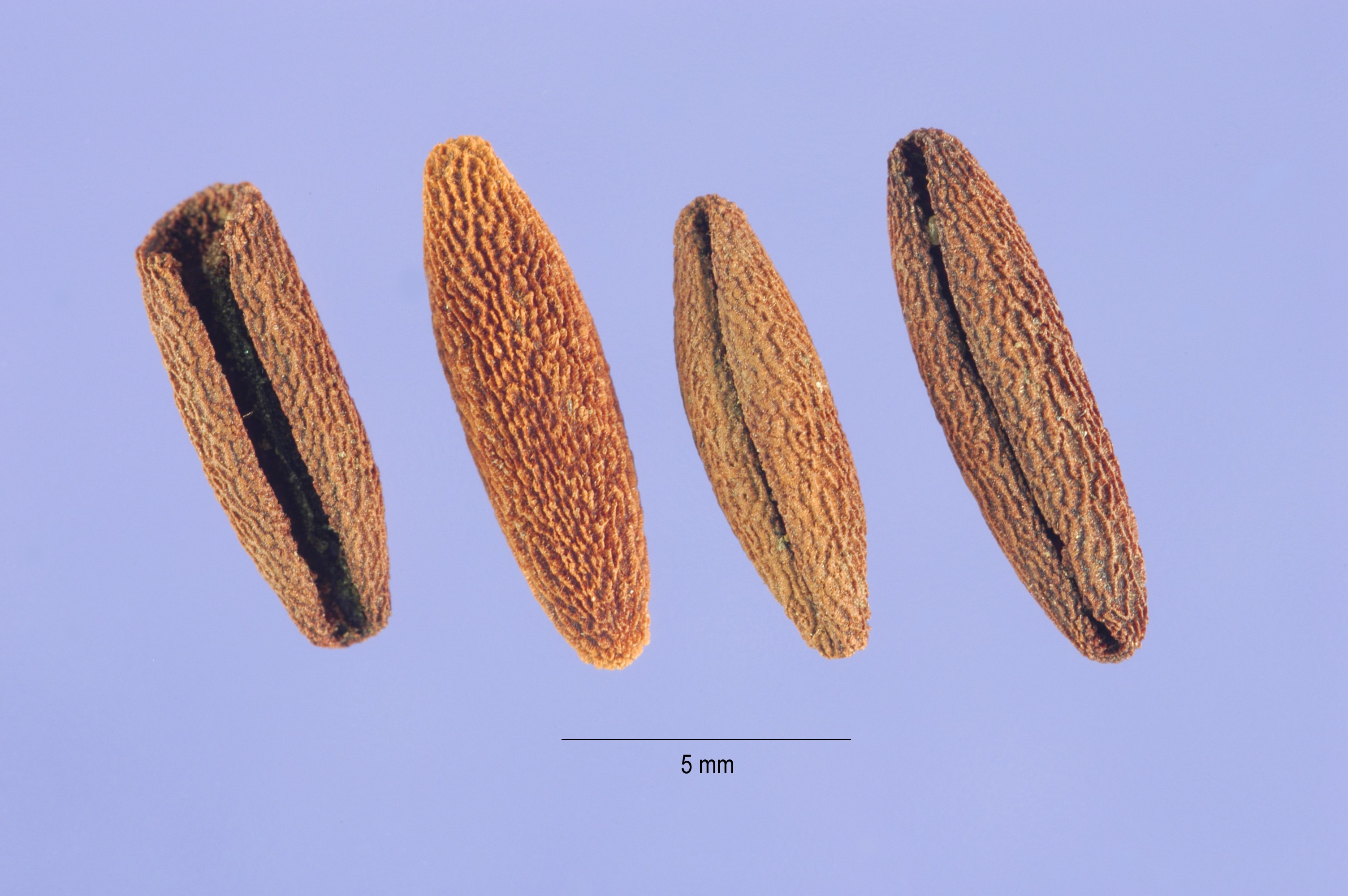
Vinca major (seeds)

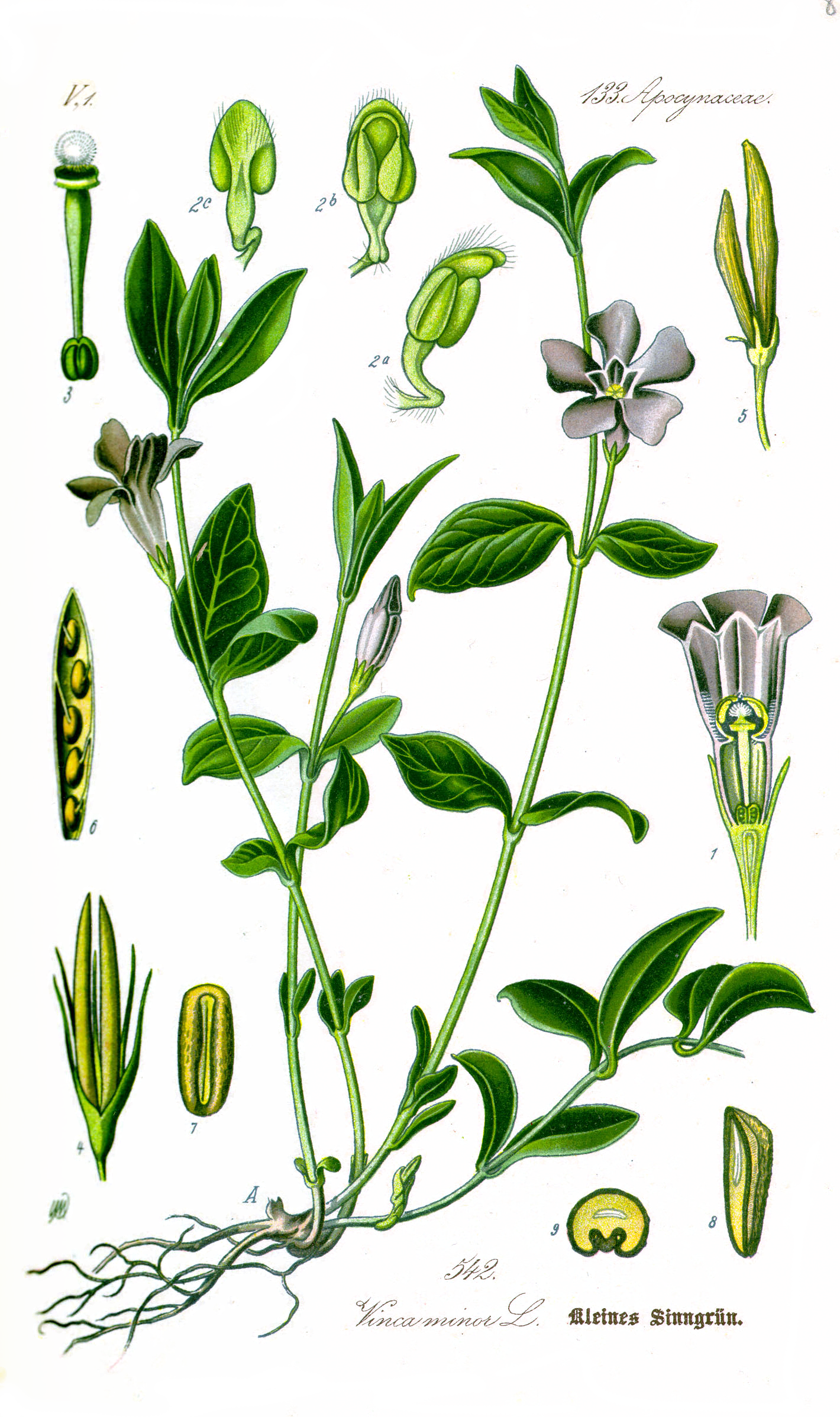
Vinca minor: botanical plate showing paired fruits (no. 5)

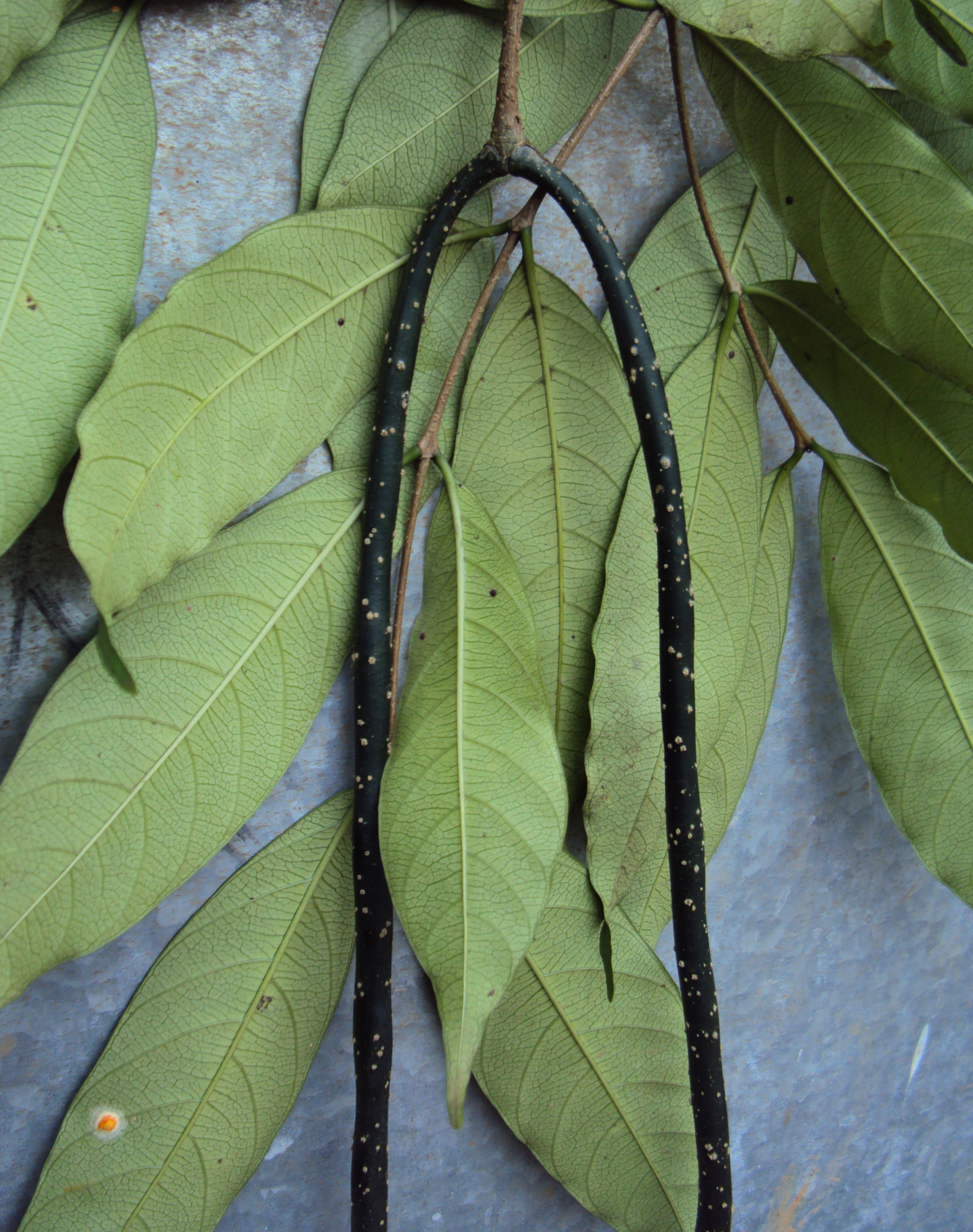
Wrightia tinctoria

=== Pachycaul species ===
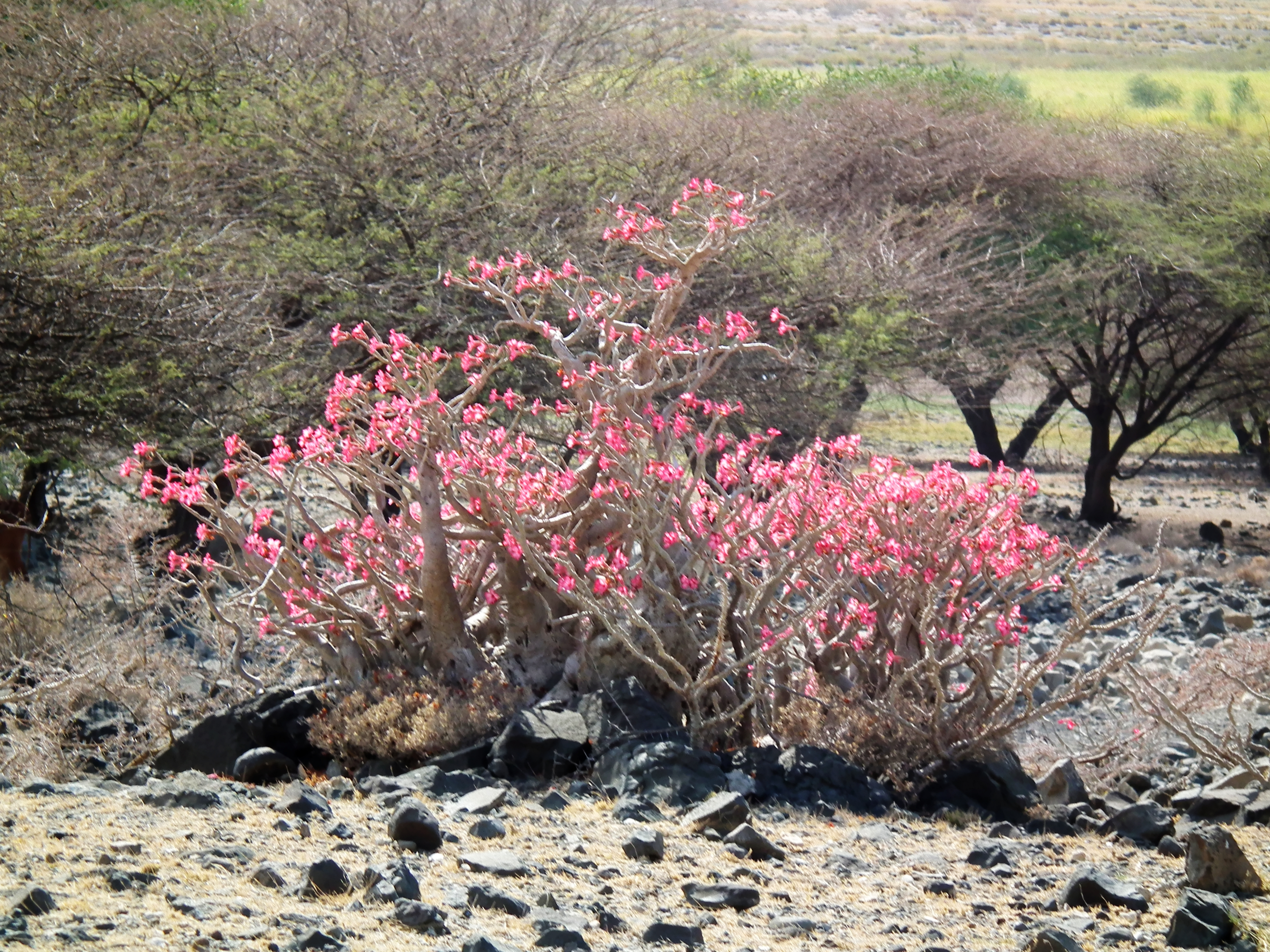
Adenium obesum growth habit of wild specimens, Tanzania

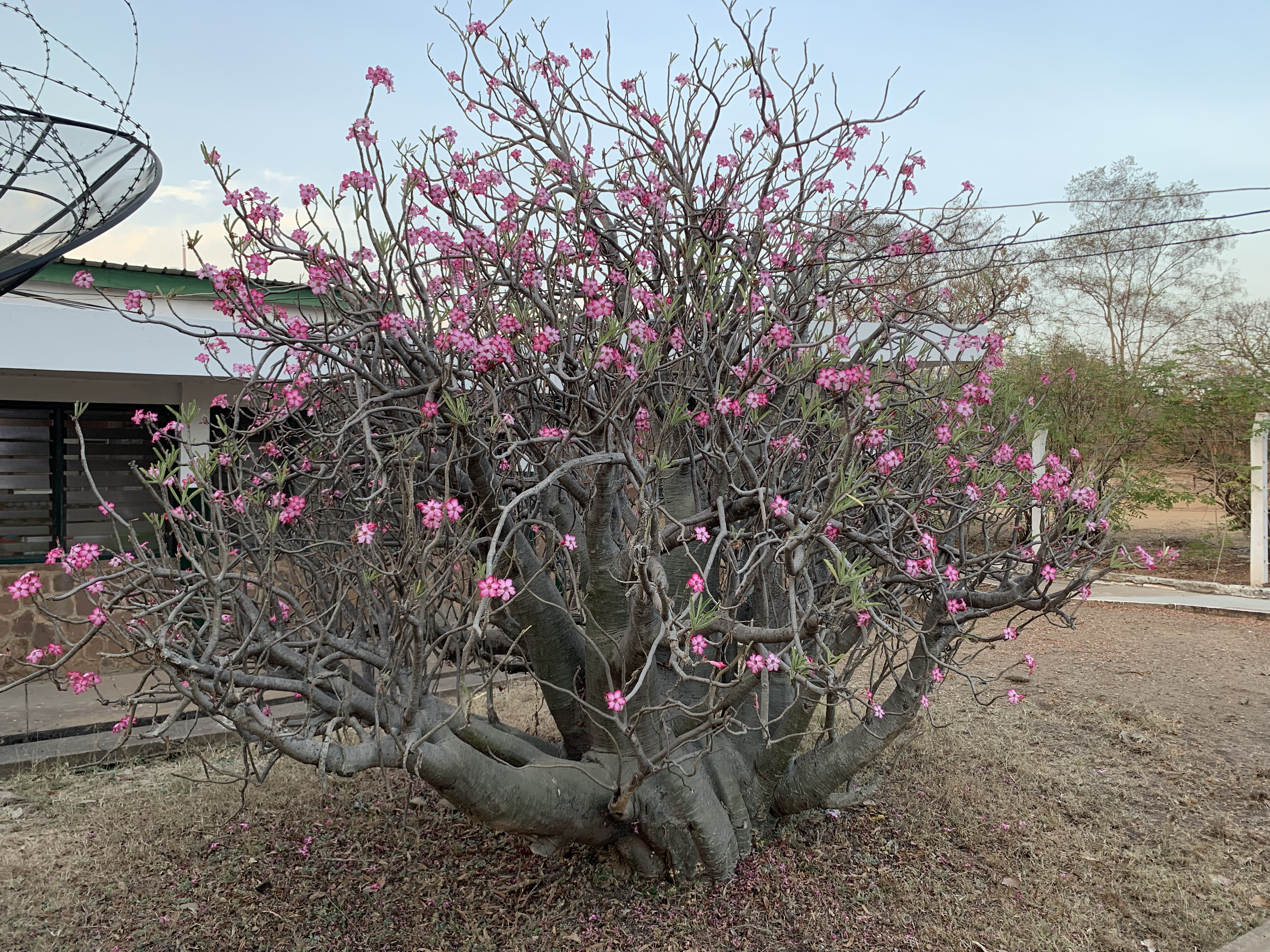
Adenium obesum close-up of colossal specimen, Ghana

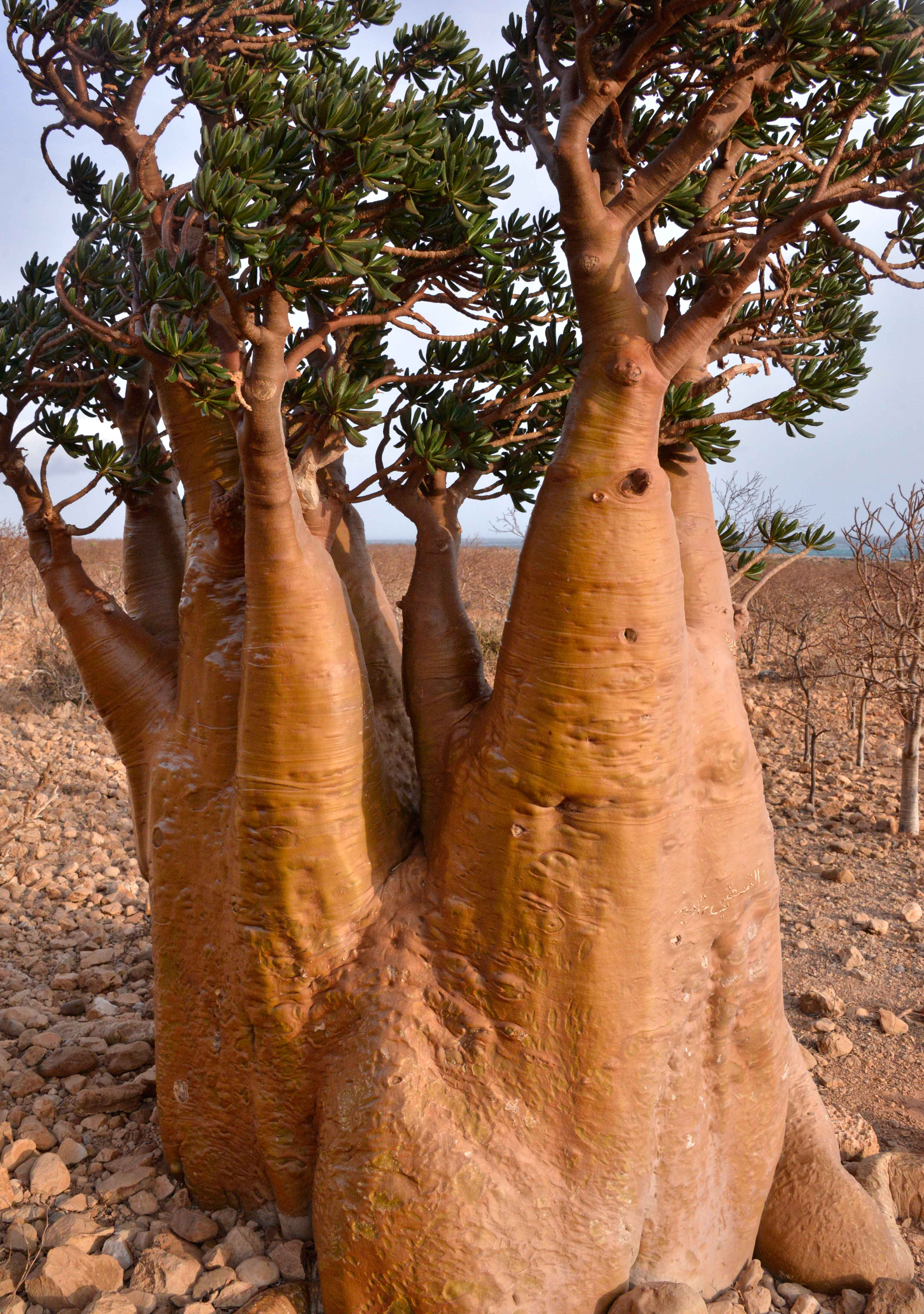
Adenium obesum trunk of extreme pachycaul specimen, Socotra

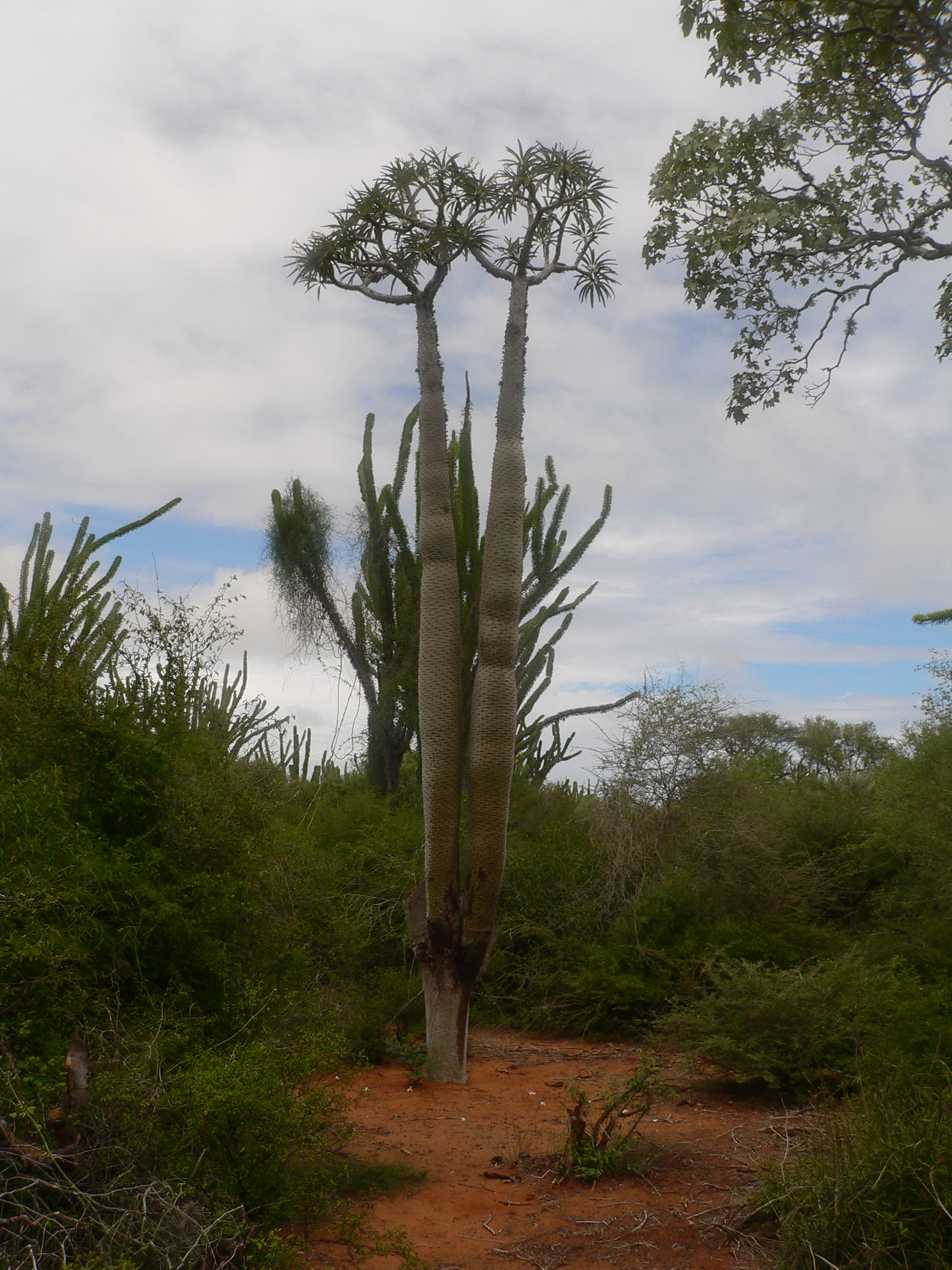
Pachypodium lamerei wild specimen of maximum height (approx 6 m (20 ft)) attained by species

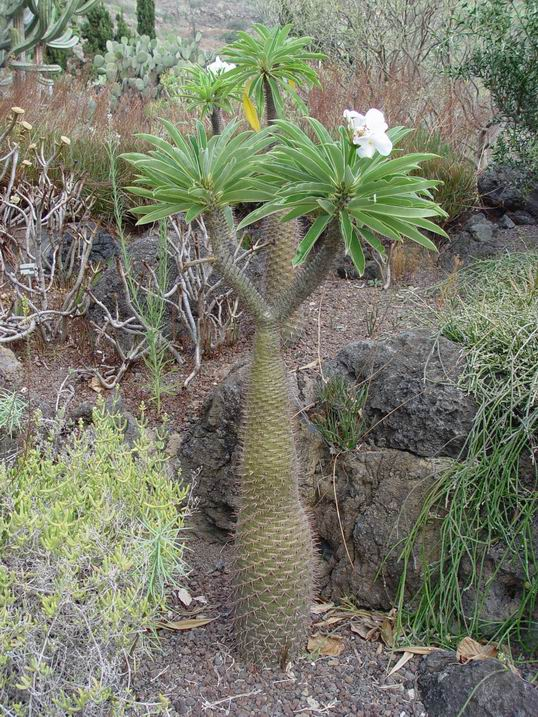
Pachypodium lamerei in flower

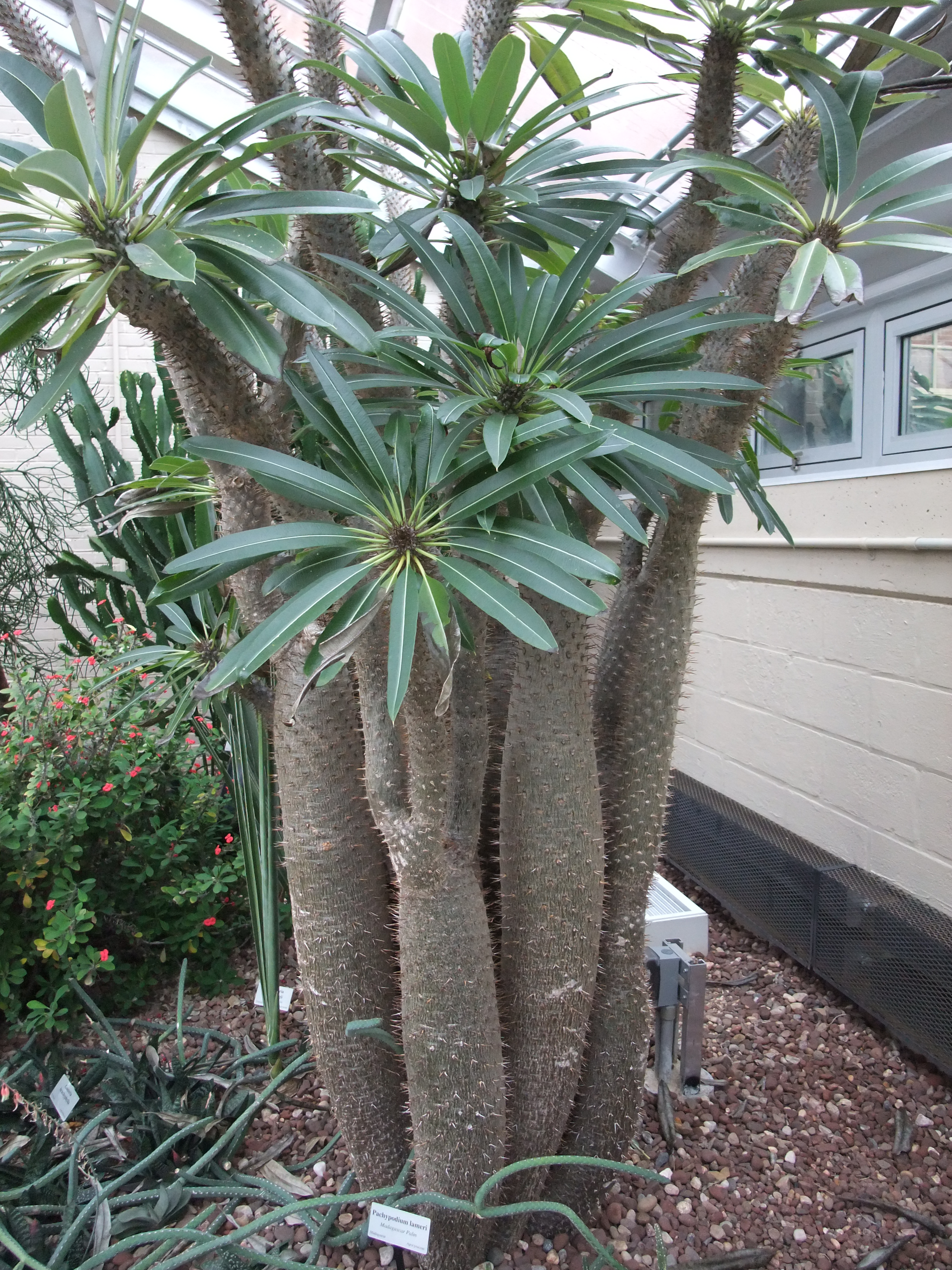
Pachypodium lamerei mature, multi-trunked specimen cultivated in glasshouse

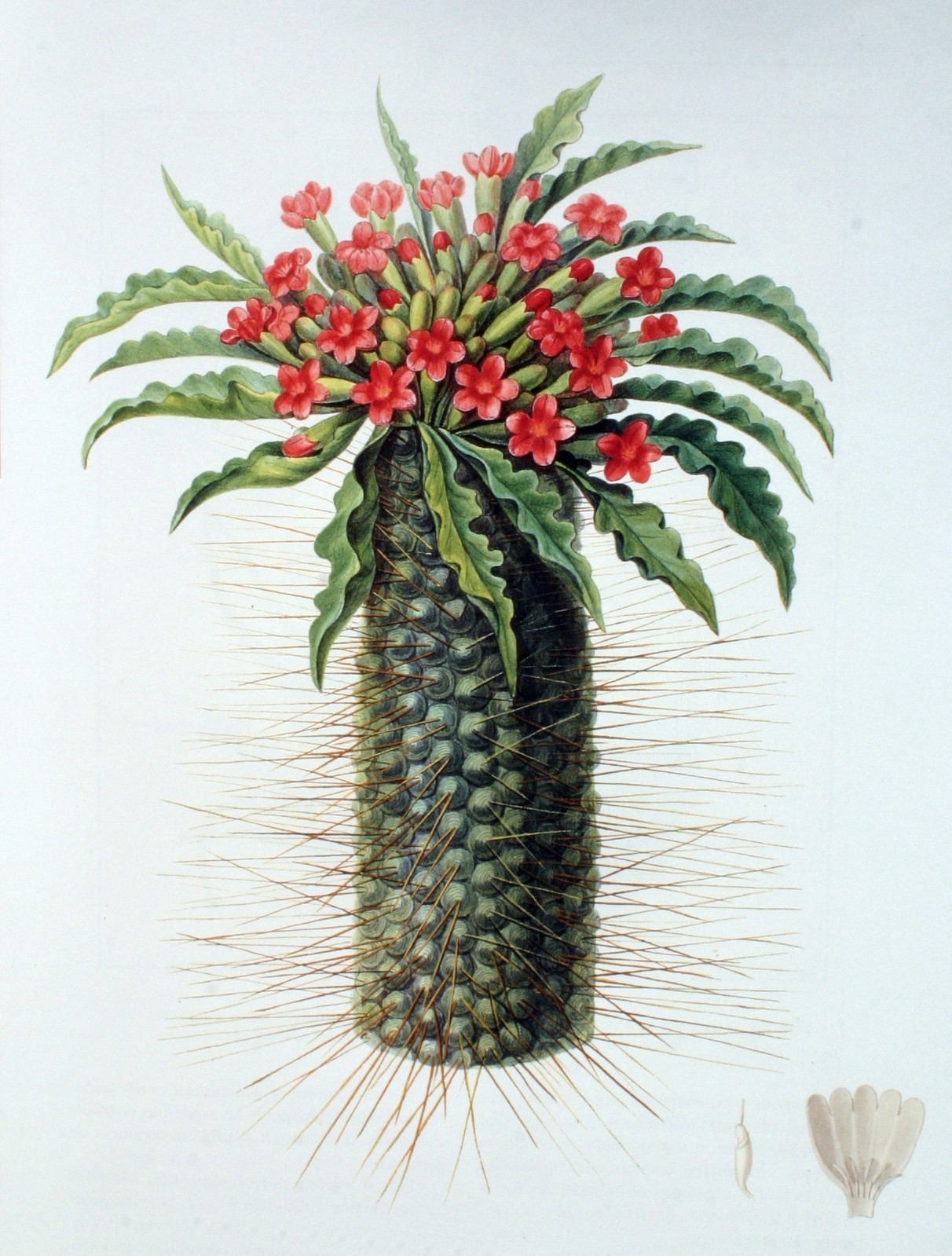
Pachypodium namaquanum
