= Blue star =

Blue star or bluestar may refer to:

- O-type star (a.k.a. blue star), a stellar classification

== Animals ==
- Linckia laevigata, a sea star from the Indian and West Pacific Oceans
- Phataria unifascialis, a sea star from the East Pacific

== Businesses ==
- Blue Star (company), an Indian Air conditioning company
- Blue Star Donuts, an American chain of gourmet donut shops
- Blue Star Ferries, a Greek ferry company
- Blue Star Infotech, Indian company
- Blue Star Line, a former British shipping company
- Blue Star Productions, a publishing imprint and a division of Book World, Inc
- Bluestar (bus company), based in Southampton, England
- Blue star (Indonesian bus company), based in Salatiga, Central Java, Indonesia
- Bluestar Company, a predecessor of ChemChina

== Military ==
- Operation Blue Star, a 1984 Indian military operation
- Blue stars used on service flags denote a United States service member fighting in a war
  - Blue Star Memorial Highway, a system of highway markers honoring veterans
  - Blue Star Mothers Club, a non-profit military support group

== Music ==
- "Blue Star" (song), first recorded 1955
- Blue Star, an album by Levinhurst

== Plants ==
- Amsonia, plant species also named "bluestar"
  - Hubricht's Bluestar (Amsonia hubrichtii), plant
- Isotoma axillaris

== Others ==
- The Blue Star (novel), a 1952 fantasy novel by Fletcher Pratt
- The Blue Star (film), a 2023 Spanish-Argentine drama film
- Newcastle Blue Star F.C., English association football team
- Blue star, the logo of Newcastle Brown Ale
- BlueStar PR, Jewish political organization
- Tesla BlueStar, code name for the Tesla Model 3 electric car
- Blue Star Wicca, a sect of traditionalist witches
- Blue Star, a nickname for the United States business band frequency of 467.925 MHz
- Blue Star (SLV), satellite launcher
- Blue star tattoo legend
- Blue Star, a type of Multiple working system used on British locomotives
- Blue Star Kachina, a legendary spirit
- Blue Star (film), a 2024 Tamil sports film

== See also ==
- Blue Stars (disambiguation)
- Blue (disambiguation)
- Star (disambiguation)
- Blue giant (disambiguation)
- Blue main-sequence star (disambiguation)
- Blue dwarf (disambiguation)
- Blue subdwarf (disambiguation)
- Blue Planet (disambiguation)
- Blue world (disambiguation)
