= Blue Planet =

Blue Planet may refer to:

== Natural sciences ==
- Earth, has been referred to as the Blue Planet due to the abundant water on its surface and/or the atmospheric hue
- Neptune, a planet in the Solar System that appears blue and can therefore be called "Blue planet"
- Blue Planet (aquarium), a public aquarium in Copenhagen, Denmark
- Blue Planet Aquarium, a public aquarium in Cheshire, England

== Films and television ==
- The Blue Planet, a 1977 film by Jiří Svoboda
- Blue Planet (1982 film), a documentary film directed by Franco Piavoli
- Blue Planet (1990 film), a documentary film directed by Ben Burtt
- Blue Planet (franchise), a BBC series including:
- The Blue Planet, a BBC documentary series narrated by David Attenborough
- Blue Planet II, a sequel to the documentary
- Blue Planet III, third in the documentary series

== Music ==
- Blue Planet (Donna Lewis album), or the title song
- "Blue Planet" (Alice Nine song), 2006
- Planeta Azul, translated Blue Planet, an album by Ruth Lorenzo, or the title song
- "Der blaue Planet" ("The Blue Planet"), a 1981 German song

== Other uses ==
- Blue Planet (role-playing game), a science-fiction game

== See also ==
- Blue dwarf (disambiguation)
- Blue giant (disambiguation)
- Blue star (disambiguation)
- Blue world (disambiguation)
