= Blue Stars =

Blue Stars or Bluestars may refer to:

== Music ==
- Blue Stars Drum and Bugle Corps, from La Crosse, Wisconsin
- The Bluestars, a 1960s band from Auckland, New Zealand
- Bluestars (album), the first album by Pretty Ricky
- The Blue Stars, a vocal ensemble led by Blossom Dearie

== Sports ==
- Blue Stars (basketball club), based in Diemen, North Holland, the Netherlands
- Blue Stars (Lebanon), a team in the Lebanese Basketball League
- Bluestars (GAA), invitational Gaelic football and hurling teams
- FC Blue Stars Zürich a Zürich based Football Club

== Other uses ==
- Chamaescilla corymbosa, a plant also known as Blue Stars

== See also ==
- Blue star (disambiguation)
