= Blue subdwarf =

Blue subdwarf may refer to:

- Subdwarf O star, subdwarf stars ranging above 30,000 K
- Subdwarf B star, subdwarf stars ranging from 10,000 to 30,000 K

== See also ==
- Blue main-sequence star
- Blue star
