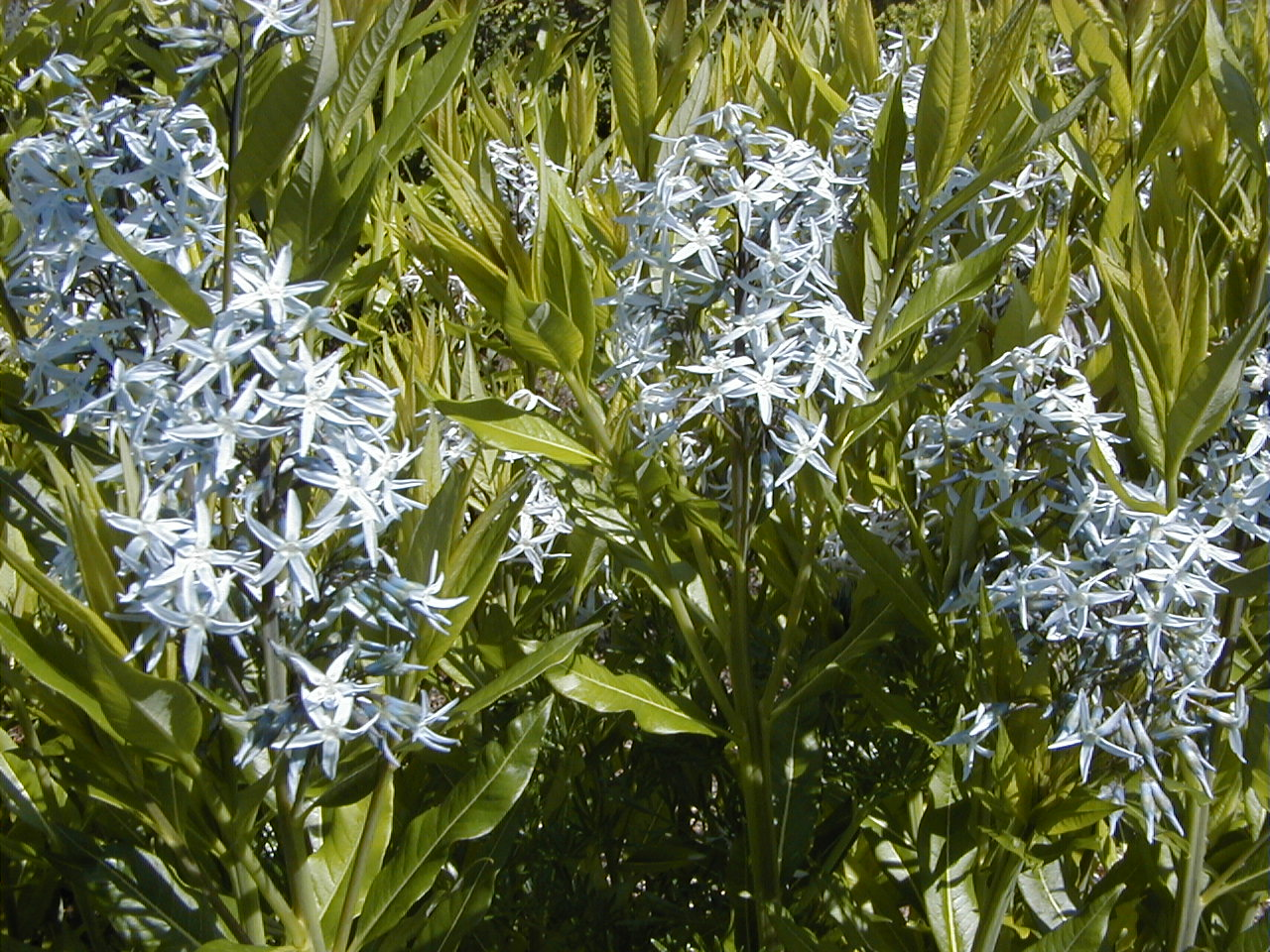

Scientific classification
- Kingdom: Plantae
- Clade: Tracheophytes
- Clade: Angiosperms
- Clade: Eudicots
- Clade: Asterids
- Order: Gentianales
- Family: Apocynaceae
- Genus: Amsonia
- Species: A. tabernaemontana

Binomial name
- Amsonia tabernaemontana Walter

= Amsonia tabernaemontana =

Species of flowering plant

Amsonia tabernaemontana, the eastern bluestar, is a North American species of flowering plant in the family Apocynaceae, found in central and eastern North America.

== Gallery ==
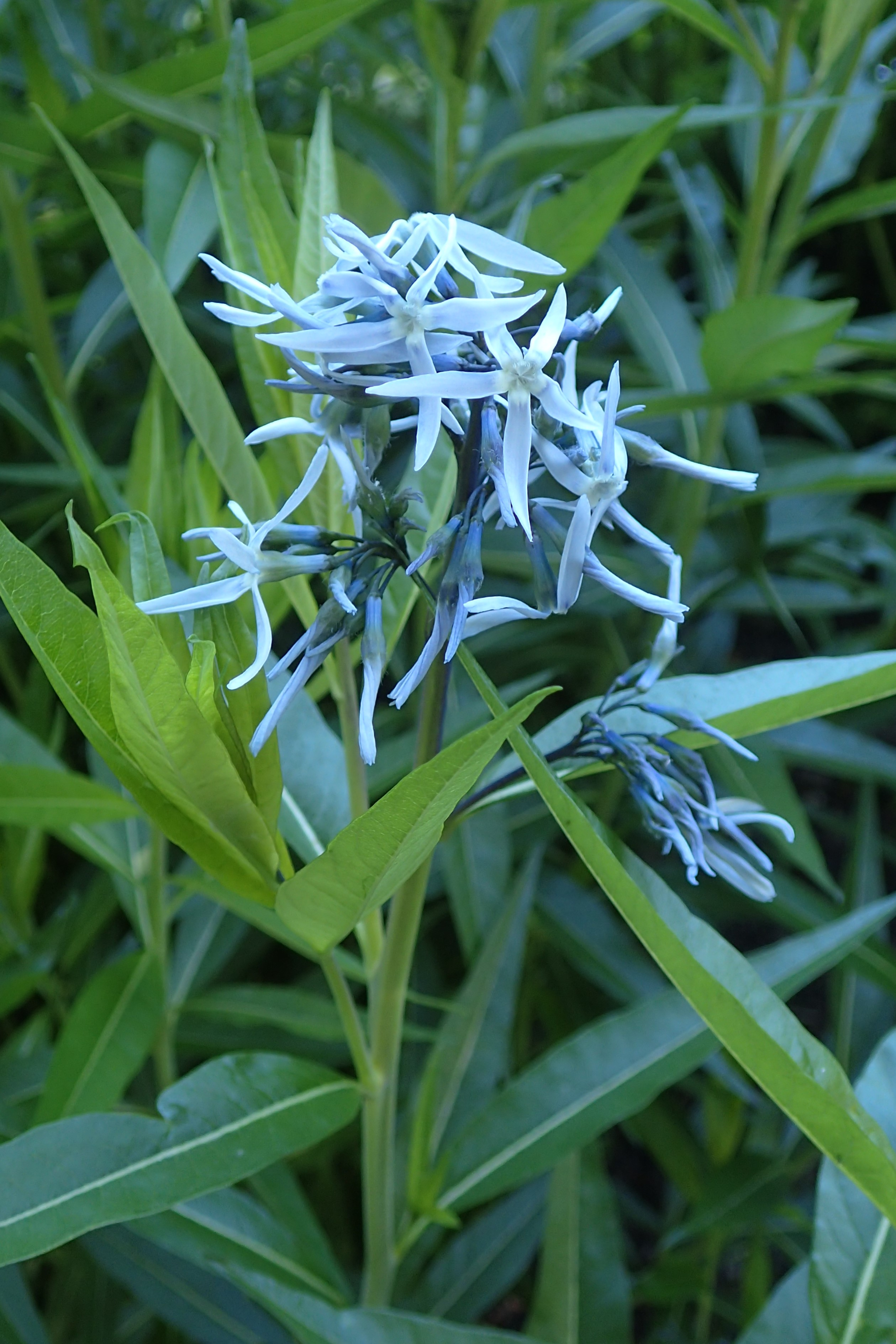
Detail of inflorescence

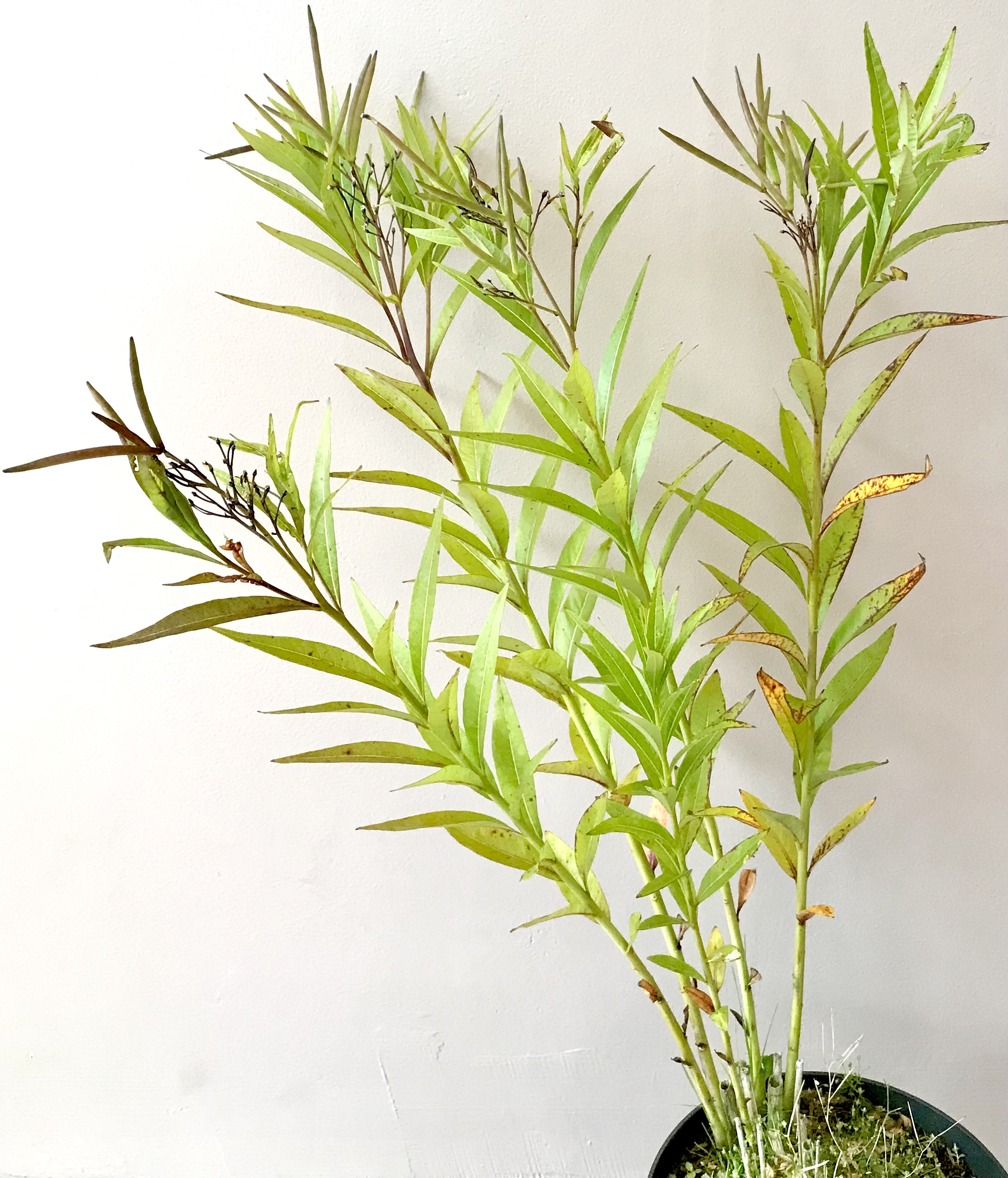
Container plant in fruit, showing paired follicles

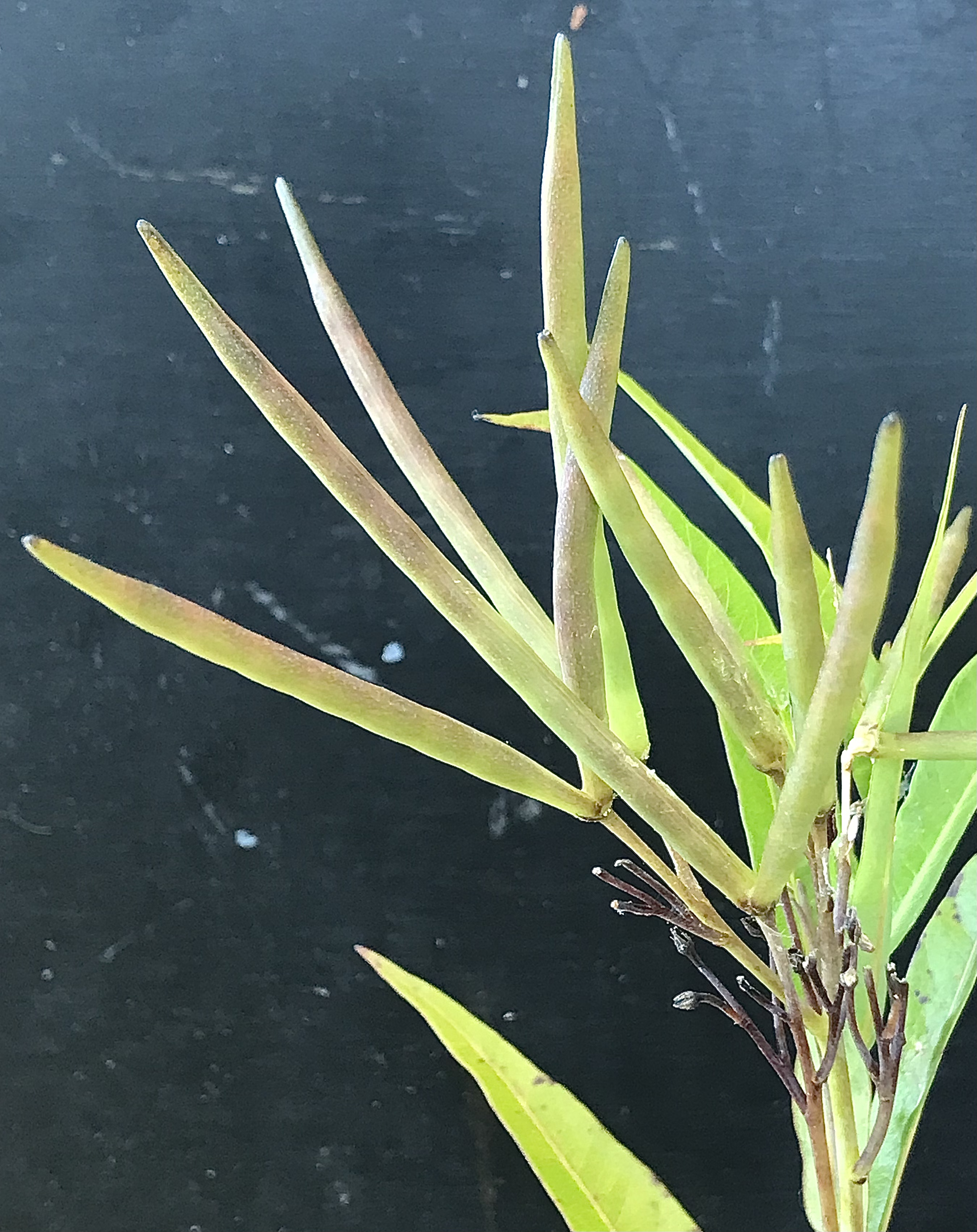
Paired follicles at the tip of fruiting stem

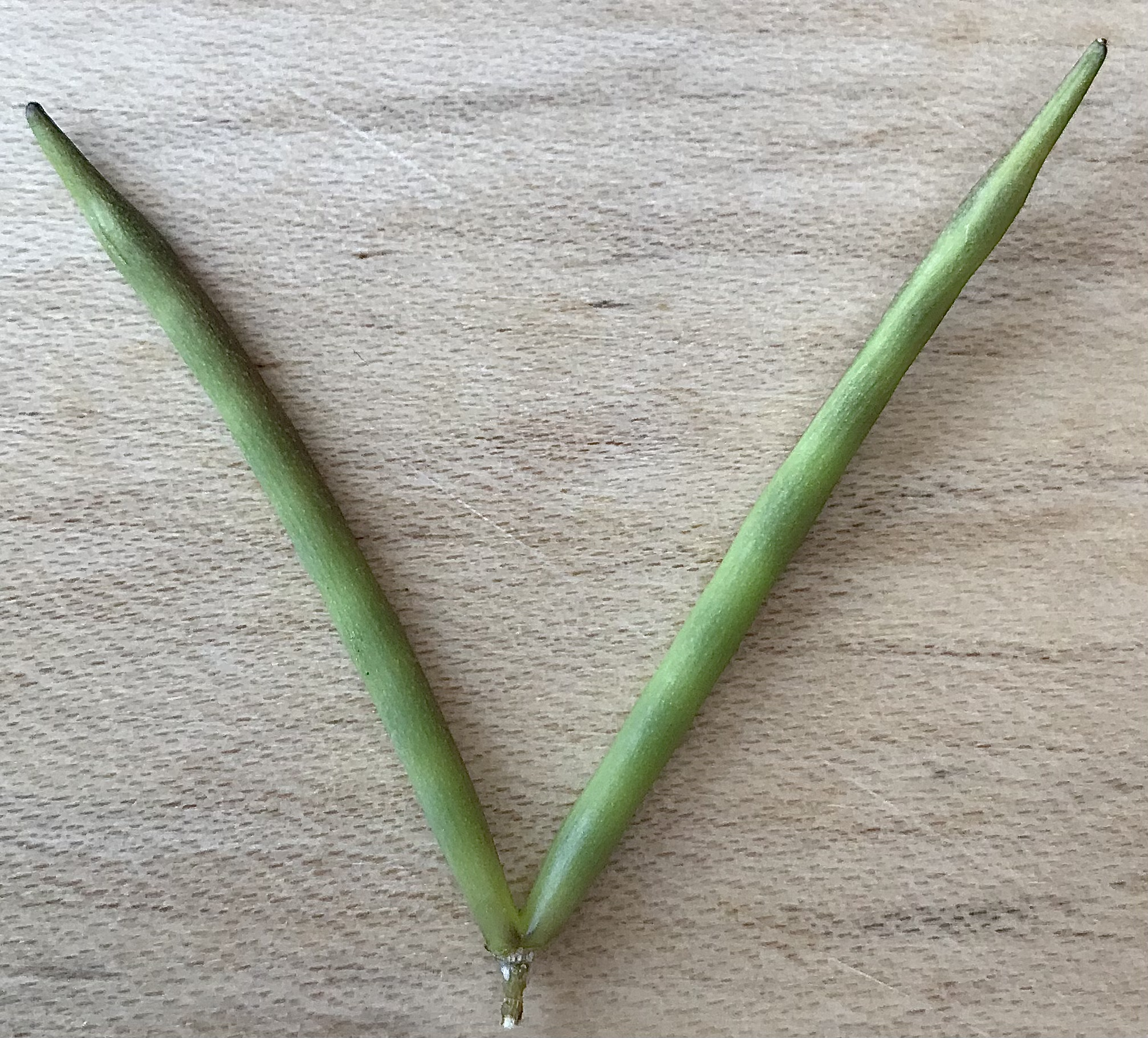
Unripe, V-shaped pair of follicles detached from plant

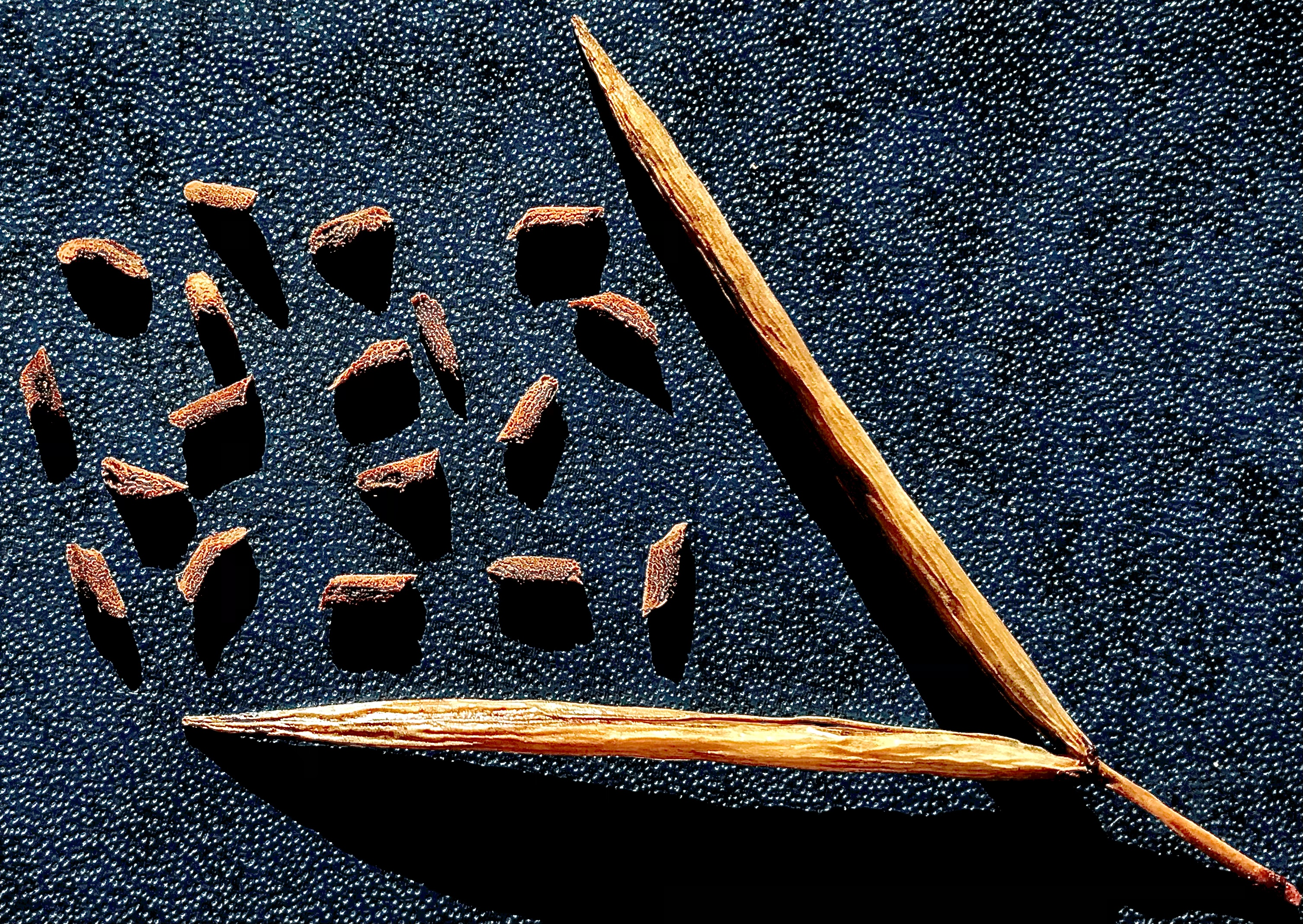
Ripe paired follicles with seeds removed and juxtaposed

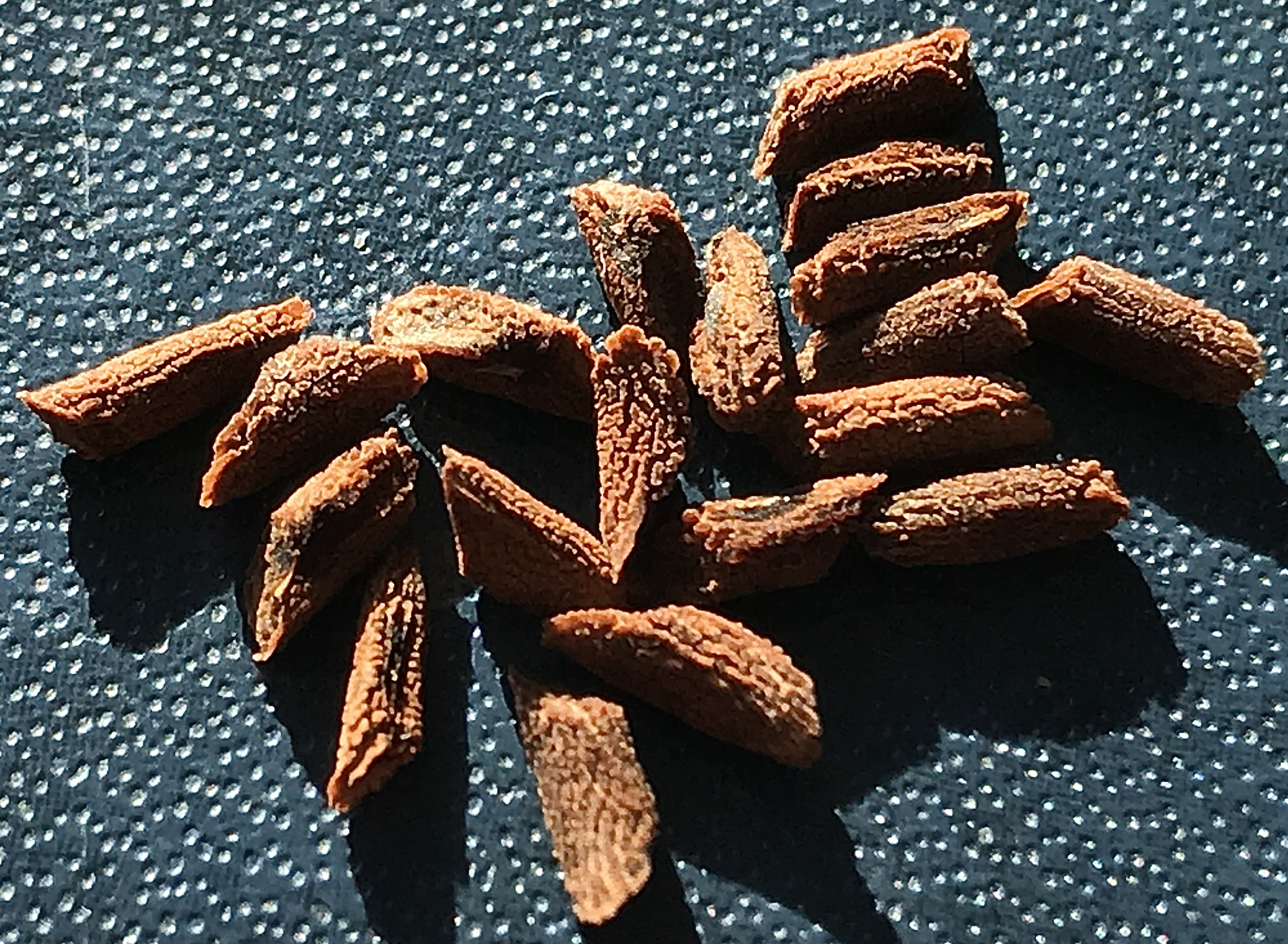
Cylindrical/prismatic seeds (x10 approx) showing deeply fissured testae
