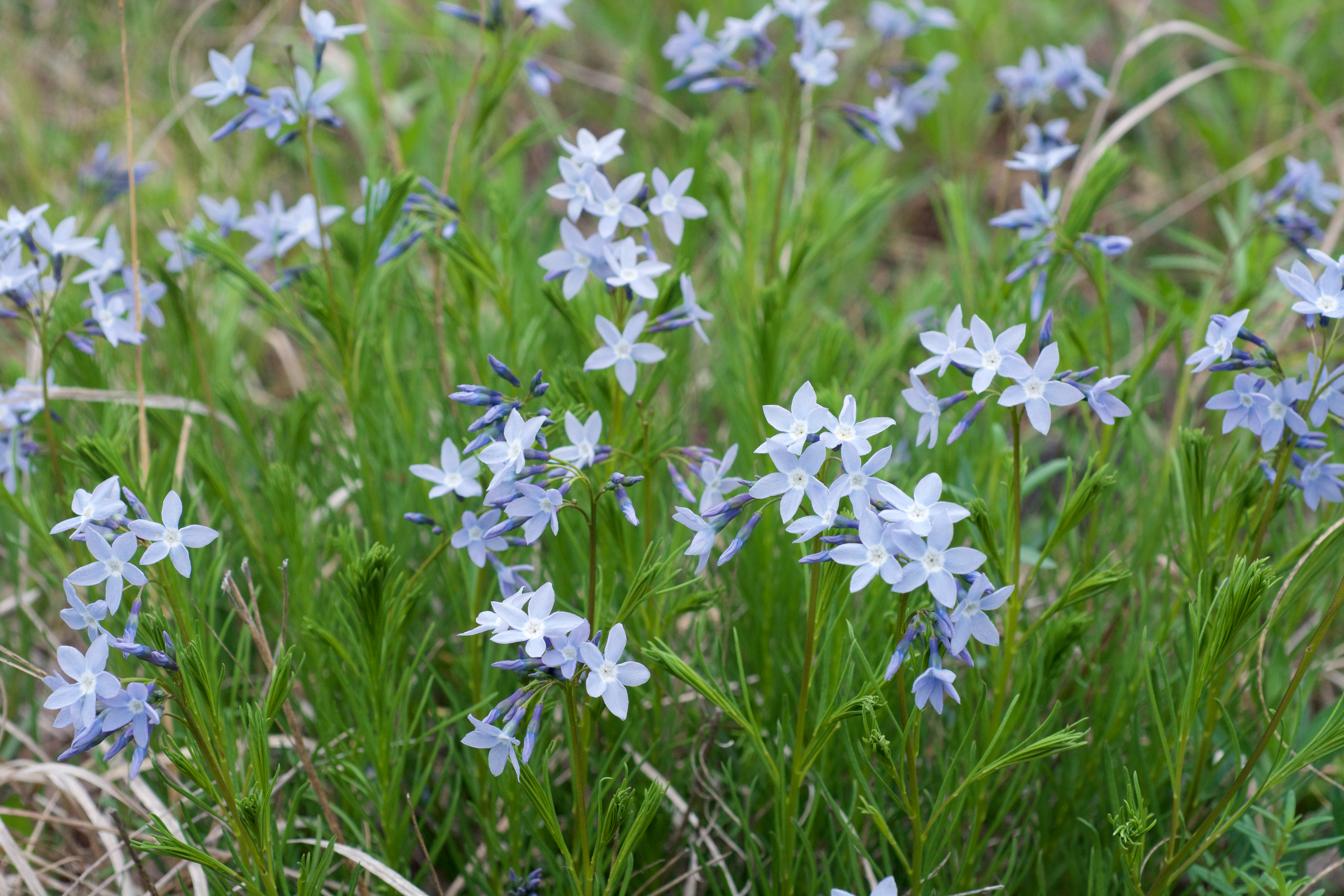
- Amsonia ciliata var. tenuifolia

Conservation status
- Secure (NatureServe)

Scientific classification
- Kingdom: Plantae
- Clade: Tracheophytes
- Clade: Angiosperms
- Clade: Eudicots
- Clade: Asterids
- Order: Gentianales
- Family: Apocynaceae
- Genus: Amsonia
- Species: A. ciliata

Binomial name
- Amsonia ciliata Walter

= Amsonia ciliata =

Species of flowering plant

Amsonia ciliata, the fringed bluestar, is a North American species of flowering plant in the dogbane family, first described in 1788.
