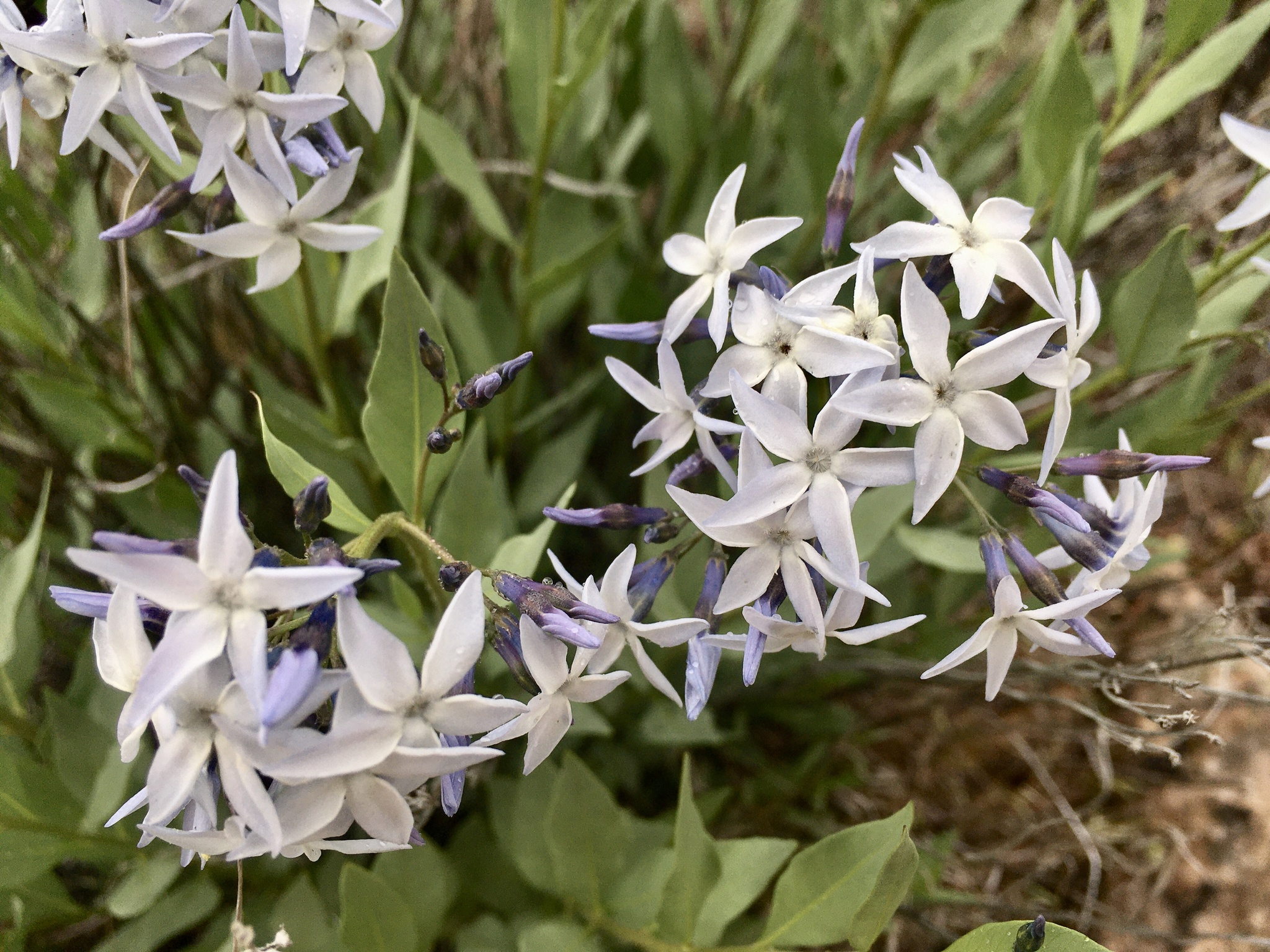

Conservation status
- Vulnerable (NatureServe)

Scientific classification
- Kingdom: Plantae
- Clade: Tracheophytes
- Clade: Angiosperms
- Clade: Eudicots
- Clade: Asterids
- Order: Gentianales
- Family: Apocynaceae
- Genus: Amsonia
- Species: A. jonesii

Binomial name
- Amsonia jonesii Woodson

Synonyms
- Amsonia latifolia M.E.Jones

= Amsonia jonesii =

Species of flowering plant in the family Plantaginaceae

Amsonia jonesii is a plant in the bluestar genus Amsonia known by the common name Colorado desert bluestar. It is in the dogbane family, but a separate genus. It grows in the deserts surrounding the Colorado River in the United States. It is now grown as a garden plant for its masses of light blue flowers and low water usage.

== Description ==
Amsonia jonesii is a herbaceous plant that is a perennial. They are typically 20–50 centimeters tall when fully grown. It has alternate leaves, each leaf being attached to the stem by itself rather than being opposite another leaf. The leaves have smooth edges without teeth or divisions (entire leaf) and a leathery texture without hairs (glabrous). The shape of Amsonia jonesii's' leaves is like an egg with the widest portion towards the base (ovate leaf), sometimes a very broad egg (broadly ovate) and 3–6.5 centimeters long.

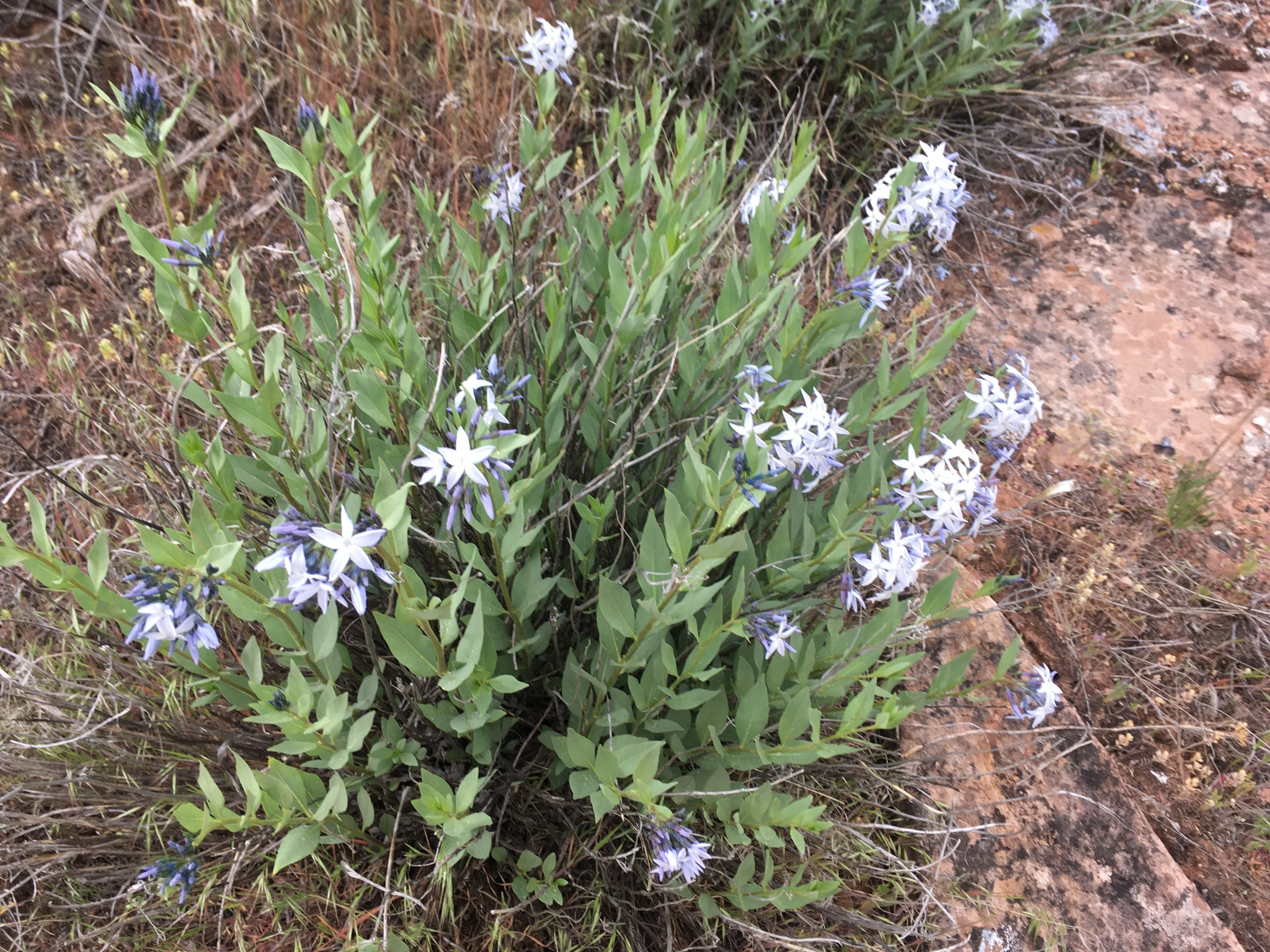
Amsonia jonesii Black Ridge Canyons Wilderness, Colorado

When flowering Amsonia jonesii has numerous, small, bright blue flowers with colored sepals that are fused at the base and divided into five parts resembling petals. The sepal lobes are 1–3 centimeters long where the true petals of the flower are just 4.5-8 millimeters long. The stamens are attached to the petals (episepalous). The tube of the flower is closed by stiff inward pointing hairs. The chalky blue flowers are most often seen in the month of May.

== Taxonomy ==
The first scientific description of this species was by Marcus Eugene Jones in 1908. However, he named it Amsonia latifolia, a name that had been previously used 1803 and so it was Nomen illegitimum. Therefore the description and naming of the species by Robert Everard Woodson as Amsonia jonesii is held to be correct.

=== Names ===
The genus name Amsonia was selected by John Clayton to honor Dr John Amson, a physician in colonial Virginia. The species name, "Jonesii", is in honor of the same Marcus E. Jones, a mining engineer and scientist who first described the species. Amsonia jonesii is known by the common name "Colorado desert bluestar" for its association with the deserts around the upper Colorado River, but is not found in the Colorado Desert.

== Distribution and habitat ==
The natural range of Amsonia jonesii is in the southwestern United States in just four states, Arizona, Colorado, New Mexico, and Utah. In Colorado it has a very limited distribution, only reported as growing in Mesa and Montazuma counties in the west of the state. It is much more widespread in Utah, recorded there in nine counties in the east and south of the state in the Colorado River drainage. It is likewise found in two Arizona counties, Mohave and Coconino, which border the river. It has only been recorded in San Juan County, New Mexico which borders Montezuma County, Colorado.

It is an uncommon plant in its range, only being found in draws or dry washes that are seasonally fed by runoff in the spring. It is often associated with pinyon-juniper or sagebrush plant communities on various soil types including sandy, gravelly, or occasionally clay soils.

=== Conservation ===
Amsonia jonesii was evaluated by NatureServe as vulnerable (G3) in 2023. At the state level they evaluated it as vulnerable (S3) in Utah and imperiled (S2) in Colorado and Arizona. They have not yet evaluated the populations in New Mexico.

== Cultivation ==
Since the 1990s Colorado desert bluestar has become a recommended plant for xeriscaping by utilities and botanic gardens. It has a very low water usage and is adapted to a wide variety of soils from somewhat clay to sandy or gravelly soils. It is deer resistant and hardy in USDA zones 4–8, and may be hardy into zone 9. It is also valued for not fading as much in summer heat, being long lived, and only requiring the removal of dead stems in the spring if a more cultivated appearance is desired.
