= It's a Blue World =

It's a Blue World may refer to:

- It's a Blue World (Mel Tormé album), 1955
- It's a Blue World (Red Garland album), 1970
- "It's a Blue World" (song), a 1940 song by Chet Forrest and Bob Wright

== See also ==
- Blue world (disambiguation)
