= White main-sequence star =

White main-sequence star may refer to:

- A-type main-sequence star, main sequence stars ranging from 7,600 to 10,000 K
- F-type main-sequence star, main sequence stars ranging from 6,000 to 7,600 K

== See also ==
- Blue main-sequence star
- White Star
