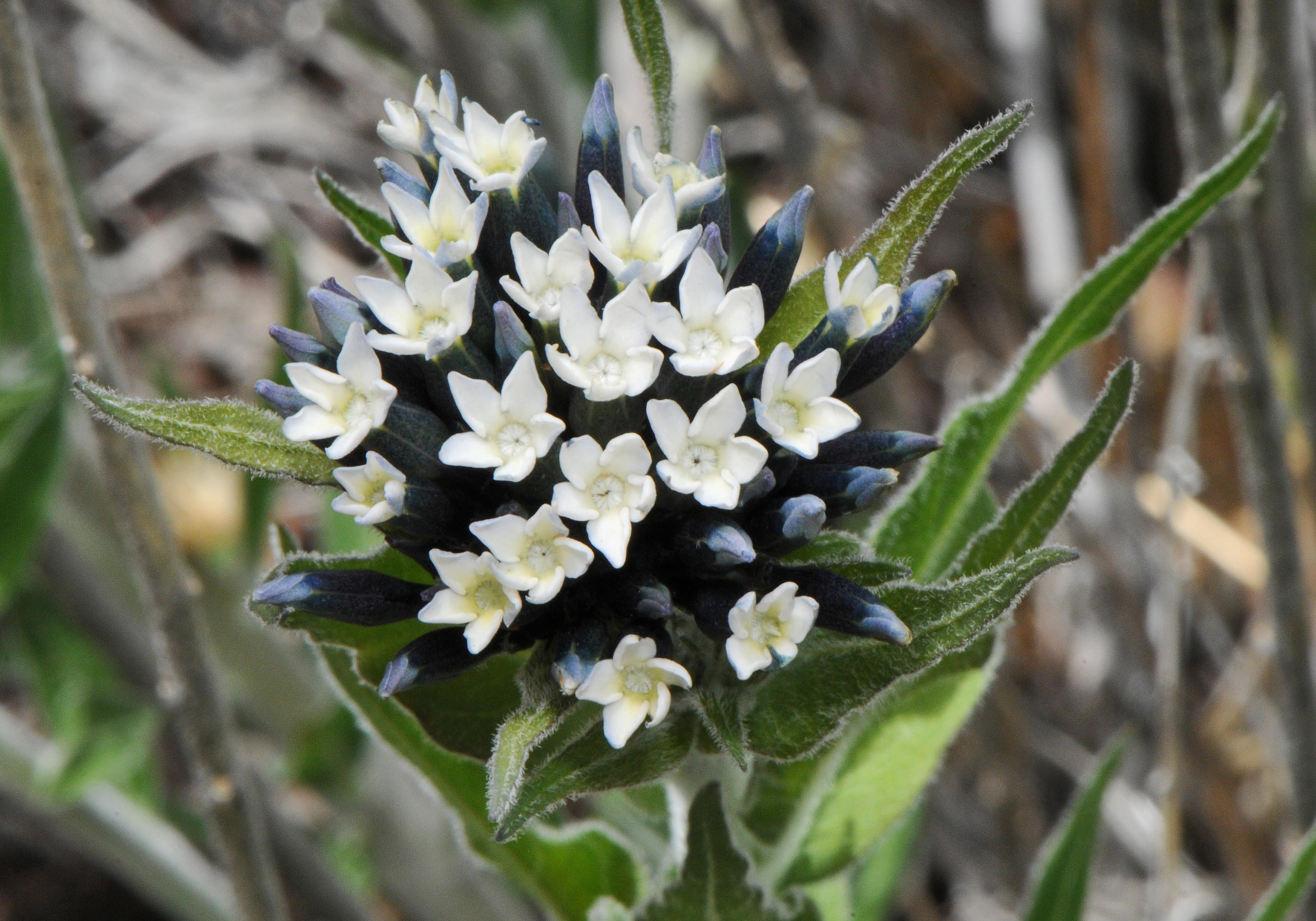

Conservation status
- Critically Imperiled (NatureServe)

Scientific classification
- Kingdom: Plantae
- Clade: Tracheophytes
- Clade: Angiosperms
- Clade: Eudicots
- Clade: Asterids
- Order: Gentianales
- Family: Apocynaceae
- Genus: Amsonia
- Species: A. kearneyana

Binomial name
- Amsonia kearneyana Woodson

= Amsonia kearneyana =

Critically endangered plant species

Amsonia kearneyana is a rare species of flowering plant in the dogbane family known by the common name Kearney's bluestar. It is native to Arizona, where there is only one native population in the Baboquivari Mountains of Pima County. There may also be a population just south of the border in Sonora, Mexico. The plant was federally listed as an endangered species in 1989. At that time the global population of the plant was made up of eight individuals in a riparian canyon. Since that time the plant has been manually propagated in an attempt to increase its numbers. Threats to the tiny native population include habitat destruction from livestock activity and flash floods in the river canyon. Many of the plants cannot reproduce because their seeds are sterile and nonviable, but this is probably due to insect predation on the seeds as they develop.

This is a perennial herb growing from a thick root in rocky, cobbly alluvial soils. It produces up to 50 hairy stems reaching up to 90 centimetres (35 in) in height, forming a hemispherical clump which may be nearly 2 metres (6 ft 7 in) across. The lance-shaped leaves are up to 10 centimetres (4 in) long and 1 or 2 centimetres (3/8 or 3/4 in) wide. The inflorescence bears clusters of white flowers each 1 or 2 centimetres (3/8 or 3/4 in) long. The corolla is tubular opening into a flat face with short, rounded lobes. The fruit is a follicle which may be 10 centimeters in maximum length. It contains relatively large seeds which measure about one centimetre (3/8 in) long and one-half centimetre (1/4 in) wide.

The land in the area is stewarded by the Bureau of Land Management, Buenos Aires National Wildlife Refuge, and the Tohono O'odham Nation. The plant occurs at between 1,095 and 1,160 metres (3,593 and 3,806 ft) elevations. Its habitat is made up of riparian vegetation surrounded by Sonoran Desert scrub, in a transition between Madrean woodlands and chaparral.

The specific name and common name are in honor of Thomas Henry Kearney, a botanist who specialized in plants of the American Southwest.
