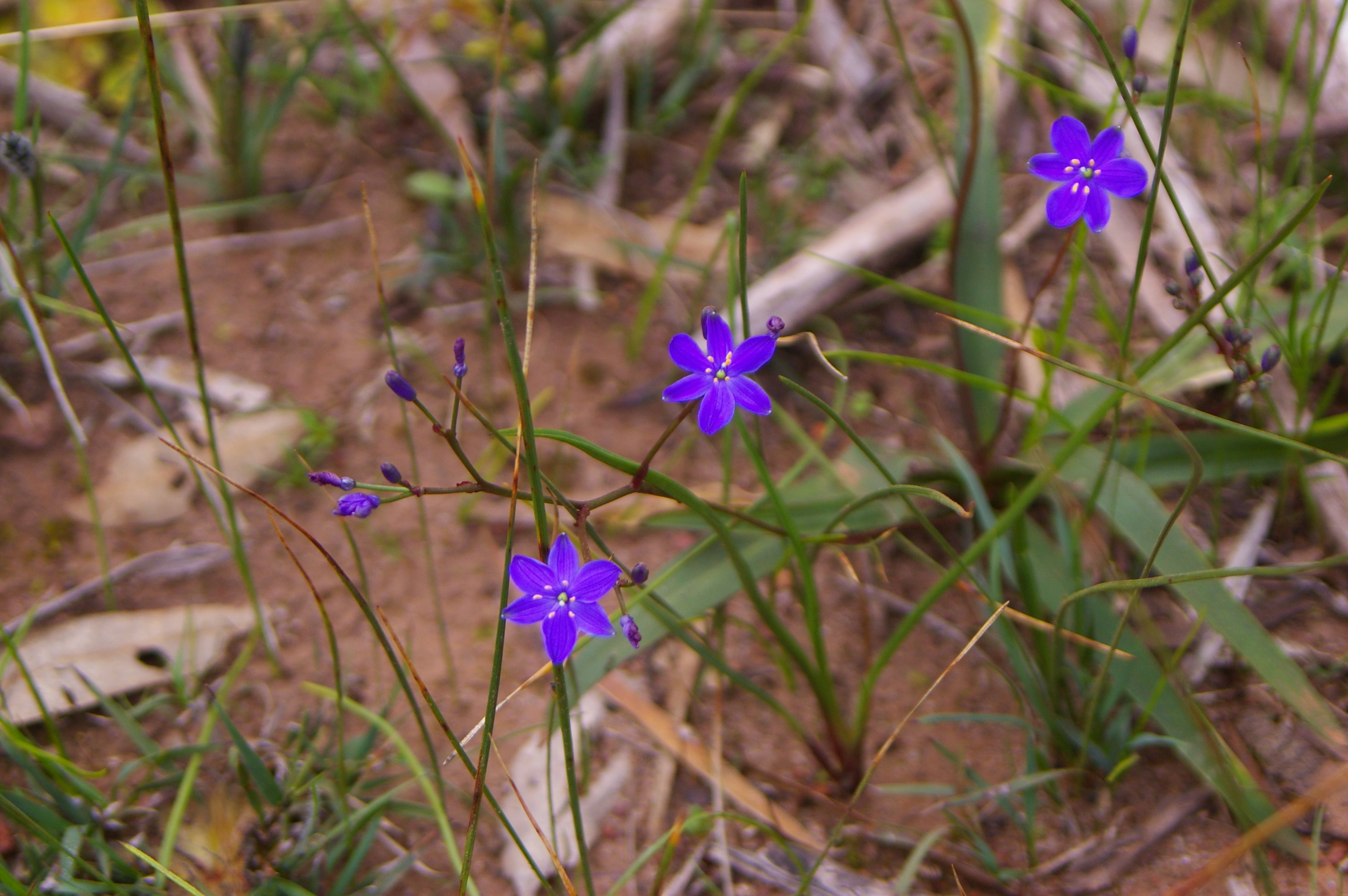
- Chamaescilla sp. near Bolgart, Western Australia

Scientific classification
- Kingdom: Plantae
- Clade: Tracheophytes
- Clade: Angiosperms
- Clade: Monocots
- Order: Asparagales
- Family: Asphodelaceae
- Subfamily: Hemerocallidoideae
- Genus: Chamaescilla; F.Muell. ex Benth.

= Chamaescilla =

Genus of flowering plants

Chamaescilla is a genus of Australian herbs in the subfamily Hemerocallidoideae within the asphodel family. They have grass-like basal leaves and tuberous roots. The flowers have six petals (each with three nerves) and six stamens. The seed capsules contain black, glossy seeds.

== Species ==
Four species were accepted as of July 2020:

- Chamaescilla corymbosa (R.Br.) Benth. (Blue Stars, Blue Squill or Mudrurt) - Western Australia, South Australia, Victoria and Tasmania.
- Chamaescilla gibsonii Keighery - Western Australia
- Chamaescilla maculata R.W.Davis & A.P.Br. – Western Australia
- Chamaescilla spiralis (Endl.) Benth., which has curled basal leaves. - Western Australia

Formerly included:

- Chamaescilla dyeri - synonym of Arthropodium dyeri

(See Arthropodium.)
