= Blue giant (disambiguation) =

A blue giant is a hot star with a luminosity class of III (giant) or II (bright giant).

Blue giant may also refer to:

- Blue Giant (band), a band from Portland, Oregon
- Blue Giant Equipment Corporation, a loading dock equipment manufacturer
- Blue Giant (manga), a Japanese manga series by Shinichi Ishizuka

== See also ==
- Agastache foeniculum, a plant species also known as blue giant hyssop
- Blue star (disambiguation)
- Blue dwarf (disambiguation)
