= Amsonia tharpii =

Conservation status
- Critically Imperiled (NatureServe)

Scientific classification
- Kingdom: Plantae
- Clade: Tracheophytes
- Clade: Angiosperms
- Clade: Eudicots
- Clade: Asterids
- Order: Gentianales
- Family: Apocynaceae
- Genus: Amsonia
- Species: A. tharpii

Binomial name
- Amsonia tharpii Woodson

Species of flowering plant

Amsonia tharpii is a species of flowering plant in the family Apocynaceae, known by the common names Tharp's bluestar and feltleaf bluestar. It is native to New Mexico and Texas in the United States.

This plant is a perennial herb with a woody taproot. It grows up to about 20 centimeters tall. The linear to lance-shaped leaves are each up to 3 centimeters long and are whorled about the stem. The leaves lower on the plant are wider than those near the top. The white, pale blue, or greenish flowers are borne in clusters at the stem tips. They are tubular and about 1.5 centimeters long. The fruit is a two-lobed follicle. The cylindrical seeds are about a centimeter long.

There are three populations of this plant in New Mexico in Eddy County, and there is a single population in Texas, in Pecos County. The New Mexico and Texas sites are over 160 kilometers apart. The plant is probably a relict species, rare now that conditions have changed since it was more abundant. Today it grows on limestone and gypsum substrates in Chihuahuan Desert scrub vegetation.

The plant is threatened by the loss and degradation of its habitat. In New Mexico it is threatened by oil and gas development and the changes that have occurred on the land due to overgrazing, such as erosion and introduced species of plants. In Texas, the plant grows on roadsides and it may be threatened by roadway maintenance.
