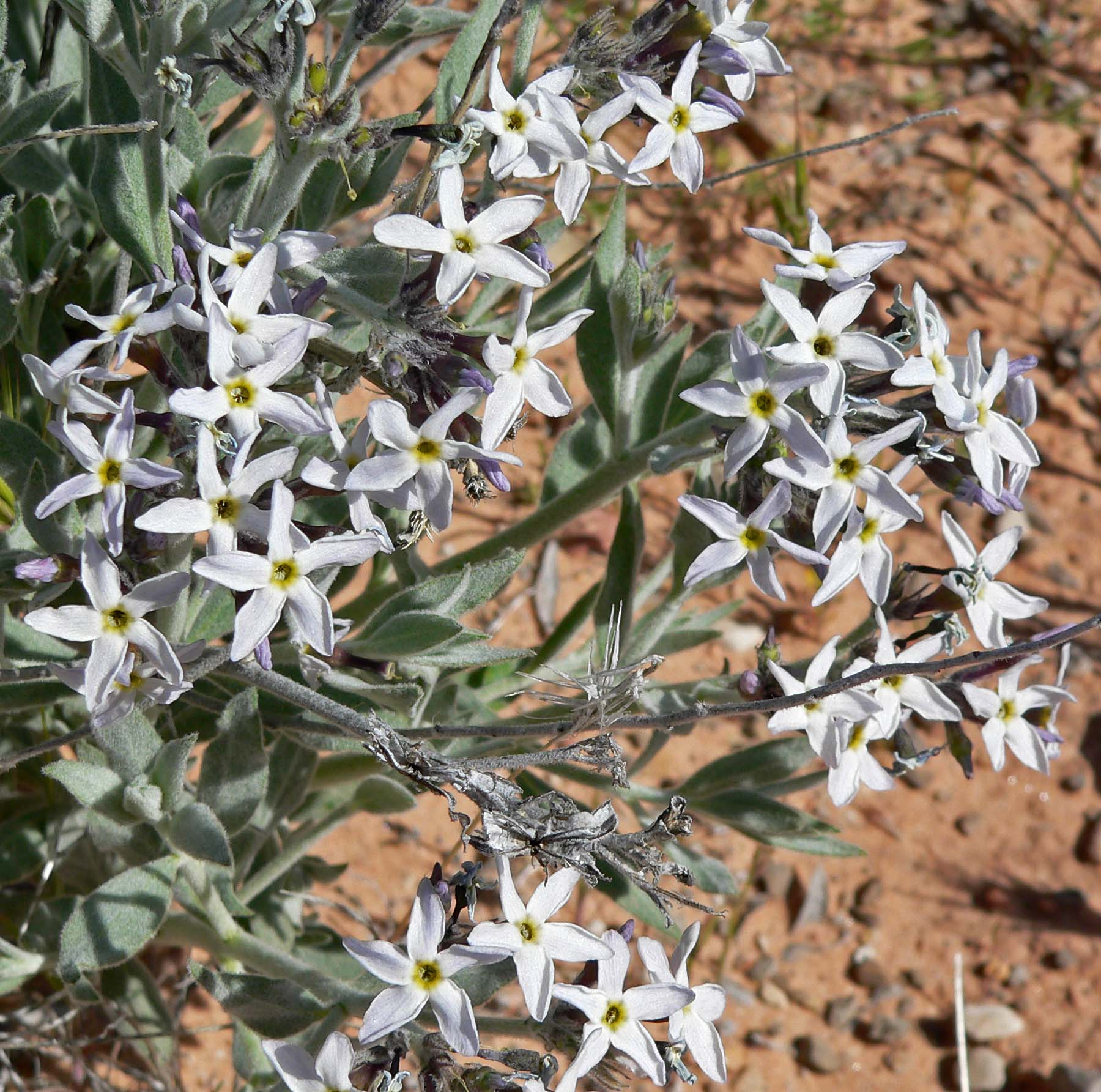
- Amsonia tomentosa - woolly form

Scientific classification
- Kingdom: Plantae
- Clade: Tracheophytes
- Clade: Angiosperms
- Clade: Eudicots
- Clade: Asterids
- Order: Gentianales
- Family: Apocynaceae
- Genus: Amsonia
- Species: A. tomentosa

Binomial name
- Amsonia tomentosa Torr. & Frém.

Synonyms
- Amsonia brevifolia var. tomentosa (Torr. & Frém.) Jeps.; Amsonia arenaria Standl.; Amsonia eastwoodiana Rydb.; Amsonia filiformis A.Nelson; Amsonia brevifolia A.Gray; Amsonia lanata Alexander

= Amsonia tomentosa =

Species of flowering plant

Amsonia tomentosa is a species of flowering plant native to the southwestern United States (S California, S Nevada, Utah, Arizona, New Mexico, W Texas) and northern Mexico (Chihuahua). Its common names include woolly bluestar and gray amsonia.

Amsonia tomentosa is a short, woody plant with many erect stems rarely reaching half a meter in height. The plant has two forms, a green glabrous (hairless) form, and a gray woolly form. The leaves are oval but pointed, and about 3 centimeters long. The flowers are white with a green or blue tint. They are tubular at the base and have flat faces with five petals. The flowers often come clumped in a cyme inflorescence. The fruits are podlike follicles that may separate into sections, each bearing a seed.

Varieties

1. Amsonia tomentosa var. stenophylla Kearney & Peebles – Arizona, New Mexico, Utah, Texas, Chihuahua
2. Amsonia tomentosa var. tomentosa – S California, S Nevada, NW Arizona

== Uses ==
Among the Zuni people, a compound poultice of the root of the tomentosa variety is applied with much ceremony to rattlesnake bite.
