= Blue Star Infotech =

Blue Star Infotech Ltd.
- Type: Public
- Traded as: BSE: 532346; NSE: BLUESTINFO
- Industry: IT services IT Consulting
- Founded: 1943 as a business. Separate entity since 2000
- Headquarters: Mumbai
- Area served: Worldwide
- Key people: Sunil (CEO)
- Services: Application development & management Product development & support Professional services Independent testing services Analytics; Business intelligence Mobility
- Revenue: ₹138.21 crore (US$14 million) (2015)
- Number of employees: 1300
- Parent: Blue Star Group
- Website: Official Website

Blue Star Infotech Ltd, based in Mumbai with offices in Bangalore, Santa Clara, New Jersey, London, Singapore, Malaysia, was a global provider of product development services, enterprise solutions and services, travel technology solutions and testing services with operations in North America, Europe, UK, and India. It was part of the US$700M Blue Star Group. They had service delivery centers in the United States, United Kingdom, India, Singapore and Malaysia. Blue Star Infotech was ranked in the list of 2013 Global Services 100 companies of Global IT and Business Process Outsourcing.

A bag of Blue Star Infotech released on occasion of its 30th anniversary, in 2013

== Overview ==
Blue Star Infotech was founded in 1943, when the International Software Division of Blue Star was founded at SEEPZ, Mumbai in partnership with HP. In March 1990, Blue Star Infotech acquired a 100% owned subsidiary in the USA called USIN International Inc, later renamed Blue Star Infotech America, Inc. In 1998, Blue Star Infotech set up a 100% owned subsidiary in the United Kingdom. Blue Star Infotech has been ranked 12th amongst the global R&D service providers.

Microsoft awarded Blue Star Infotech with the "Best Dynamics Partner of the Year" in India for financial year 2006 & 2008. They Named to the Microsoft Dynamics President's Club for the year 2006 and 2008. Effective 1 January 2016, Blue Star Infotech Limited has sold its Information Technology business to the Infogain group of Companies. This marks the exit of Blue Star from this business after 33 years.
