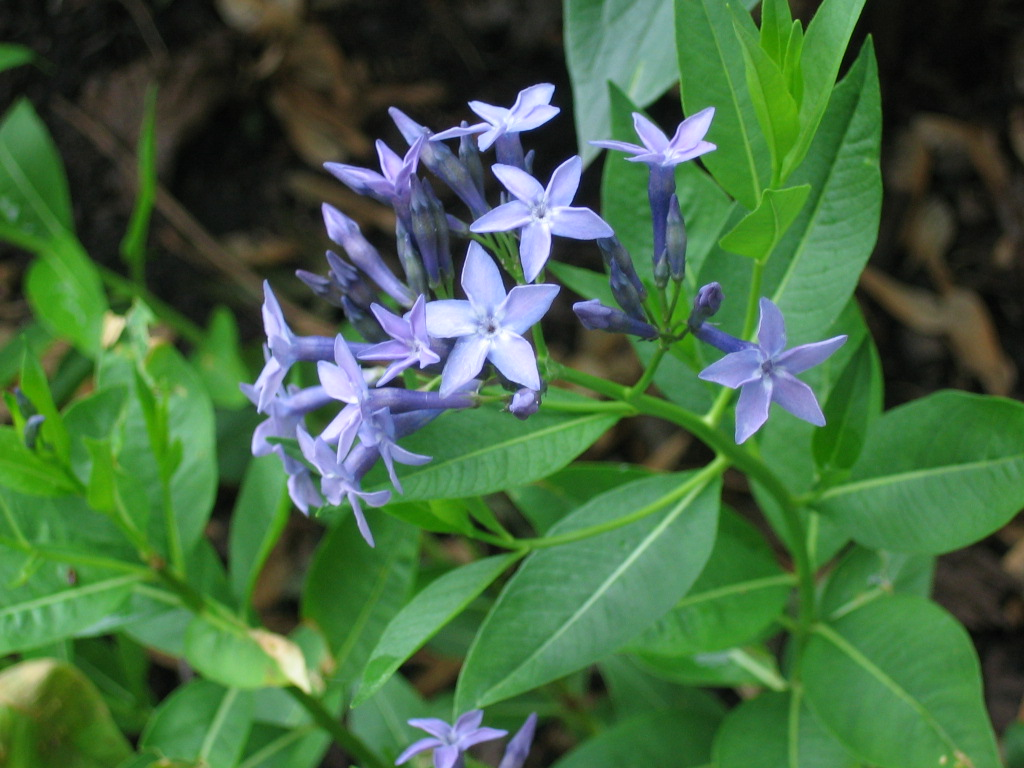

Conservation status
- Critically Endangered (IUCN 3.1)

Scientific classification
- Kingdom: Plantae
- Clade: Tracheophytes
- Clade: Angiosperms
- Clade: Eudicots
- Clade: Asterids
- Order: Gentianales
- Family: Apocynaceae
- Genus: Amsonia
- Species: A. orientalis

Binomial name
- Amsonia orientalis Decne.

Synonyms
- Rhazya orientalis (Decne.) A.DC.; Rhazya thracica Davidov

= Amsonia orientalis =

European bluestar

Species of flowering plant

Amsonia orientalis, the European bluestar, is a species of flower in the dogbane family. It is found in European Turkey, and may be extirpated from Greece. Other historical populations appear to be lost. It is threatened by habitat loss, collection for ornamental use, and over-harvesting for research. It contains many glycosides and glycoalkaloids, and also has broad antimicrobial activity.

Amsonia orientalis is the only European member of its genus. One other species (Amsonia elliptica (Thunb.) Roem. & Schult.) is found in East Asia, while all the others are native to North America.

== Alkaloids ==
Rhazya orientalis contains some alkaloids.
