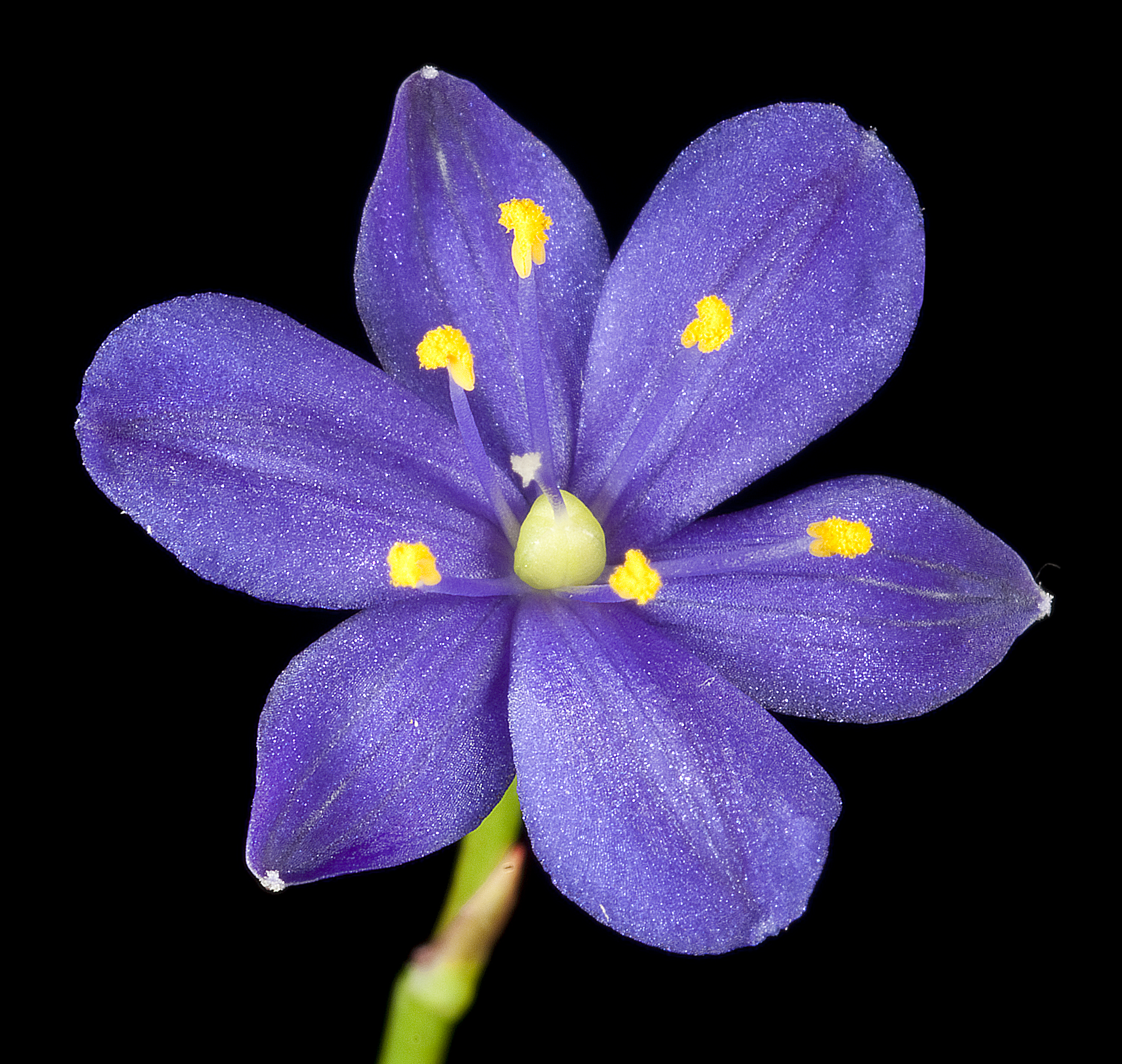

Scientific classification
- Kingdom: Plantae
- Clade: Tracheophytes
- Clade: Angiosperms
- Clade: Monocots
- Order: Asparagales
- Family: Asphodelaceae
- Subfamily: Hemerocallidoideae
- Genus: Chamaescilla
- Species: C. spiralis

Binomial name
- Chamaescilla spiralis Endl. ex. Benth.

= Chamaescilla spiralis =

Species of plant

Chamaescilla spiralis is a plant species in family Asphodelaceae and genus Chamaescilla. It is located in Western Australia. The species name spiralis is derived from the curled shape of its leaves.

The native range of this species is SW. Australia. It is a perennial or tuberous geophyte and grows primarily in the subtropical biome.

== Distributing Regions ==
This specie of flower is found in many regions of Australia such as:

IBRA Regions that include Avon Wheatbelt, Esperance Plains, Geraldton Sandplains, Jarrah Forest, Mallee, Swan Coastal Plain.

IBRA Subregions that include Dandaragan Plateau, Eastern Mallee, Fitzgerald, Katanning, Lesueur Sandplain, Merredin, Northern Jarrah Forest, Recherche, Southern Jarrah Forest, Western Mallee.

Local Government Areas (LGAs) that include Albany, Beverley, Coorow, Cranbrook, Cuballing, Dowerin, Dumbleyung, Esperance, Gnowangerup, Jerramungup, Kent, Kojonup, Kulin, Lake Grace, Moora, Mundaring, Narrogin, Pingelly, Plantagenet, Quairading, Ravensthorpe, Tammin, Victoria Plains, Wagin, West Arthur, Wickepin, Williams, Woodanilling, York.
