= White Star =

White Star or Whitestar may refer to:

- Any star with a suitable spectral type
- A-type star, stars that tend to be white
- WhiteStarUML, a UML modeling tool
- White Star (cider), a brand of British white cider
- White Star (horse), a show horse
- White Star Line, a steamship company
- Whitestar, a common name for the morning glory species Ipomoea lacunosa
- White Star Woluwé F.C., a football club in Belgium
- FBC White Star, a football club in Peru
- Operation White Star, name for the U.S. military assistance program to Laos from 1959-1962
- The Order of the White Star of Estonia
- Tesla Model S, previously codename Whitestar, a Tesla Motors electric sedan
- Wisła Kraków, a football club in Poland, nicknamed the White Star
- White Star, Kentucky
- White Star, Saskatchewan
- U+2606 ☆ WHITE STAR
