= The Bluestars =

New Zealand garage rock band

- Origin: Auckland, New Zealand
- Genres: Garage rock
- Years active: 1962–1967
- Labels: Decca, Allied
- Past members: Murray Savidan; John Harris; Roger McClay; Rick von Bokhoven; Jim Crowley; Eric Jackson (Drums)

The Bluestars were a garage rock band from Auckland, New Zealand, who were active during the 1960s. They became one of the most popular bands in New Zealand at the time and enjoyed a hit in the Auckland area with their first single, which appeared on Decca Records, where they were the first New Zealand rock band to be signed to the label. But, they are now best known for their subsequent release, "Social End Product", that with its line "I don't stand for the Queen", took aim at the monarchy and social oppression, anticipating certain sentiments expressed in the music of the Sex Pistols and other 1970s punk acts. Their work is now highly regarded by garage rock enthusiasts.

== History ==
=== Origins ===
The Bluestars formed in Auckland, New Zealand in 1962. John Harris, a young reporter for the Auckland Star, was also a musician adept on several instruments. One day he met Murray Savidan and Roger McLay, two students at Auckland Grammar School, at a second-hand music shop, and they decided to form a band, initially called the Nomads. Saividan sang and played bass and McLay played guitar. Harris became the drummer, but switched to lead guitar after McLay departed from the group. Jim Crowley became the group's drummer. Harris recruited a friend, Rick von Bokhoven to join on vocals and guitar. In 1962, the Nomads changed their name to the Bluestars. By 1963, they were playing regular gigs at church halls and youth clubs.

That year, a key turning point in the band's early development happened when Savidan bought a copy of the Beatles' Please Please Me LP and played it for the group. They immediately decided to change their whole approach to a beat group format. They cancelled all of their scheduled appearances in order to learn the new material, rehearsing nearly all of the songs from Please Please Me. They returned to live performance and unveiled their new repertoire at St Chad's Hall, but were initially greeted with a tepid response. But, within a week of plying new material, it began to catch on. With their new direction, they immediately made most of the other local bands appear outmoded and their stock began to rise. Influenced by the Beatles, they began to write their own songs. In early 1964, they approached Eldred Stebbing of Zodiac Records about a possible record deal. They recorded several demo tapes at Stebbing's basement studio, but none of the recordings were issued. At this time bassist Murray Savidan was handling the group's bookings and arrangements. He steered them away from the seedy and sometimes dangerous inner-city clubs in favour of suburban dance venues, such as the Tamaki Yacht Club, where they often drew crowds of up to three hundred.

=== Recording ===
==== Decca ====
In 1965, actor and voice-over man Terry Hayman approached the group, offering to become their manager. He told the group that he had a recording contract with Decca Records in London. While the group was sceptical of his claim, they signed with him anyway. Hayman arranged for a clandestine recording session at Auckland's Radio Theatre, where they snuck in, uninvited, and hurriedly recorded four tracks before the Auckland Symphony Orchestra arrived. Hayman brought in recording engineer Wahanui Wynard. Two of the songs from the session, much to the band's astonishment, ended up being released on a single for Decca, demonstrating that Hayman was not only affiliated with the label, but had arranged to have the band signed in November, making them the first New Zealand rock band to record for the prestigious label. The resulting single "Please Be a Little Kind" b/w "I Can Take It" was released by Decca's London label in December 1965 and on their Australian counterpart in February 1966. The A-side was a moody ballad, and, on the flip-side, "I Can Take It" was a raucous and upbeat garage number. The single reached #12 on the Auckland charts. The Bluestars became one of the most popular bands in New Zealand along with the La De Da's and the Gremlins. Later in 1966, they went to Mascot Studios to record a follow-up "It's the End" and "S'pose We're Away", but the single was rejected by Decca, who parted ways with the group. The band recorded several other songs at the Mascot sessions, such as the brooding "Don't Wanna Be Lonely".

==== Allied International ====
They proceeded to sign with Allied International Records, and recorded their next single which featured a song on the A-side for which they are best-known, "Social End Product". The song features highly invective lyrics delivered in snide fashion by Murray Savidan. Its first line, "I Carry my girl through the main city streets", is based on a real-life incident involving a row between lead guitarist John Harris and his girlfriend in which he carried her "kicking and screaming" around downtown Auckland. Its defiant third line, "I don't stand for the Queen", announced a swipe at the conventional practice of standing to sing "God Save the Queen" before public events, such as movie showings, and anticipated the kind of anti-royalist sentiments later heard from the Sex Pistols and other punk acts. The B-side, in stark contrast to its counterpart, is a light pop ballad. The single failed to chart.

Later in 1966, guitarist Rick von Bonhoven departed, and in an attempt to reflect the influence of popular organ-based acts such as the Spencer Davis Group and the Small Faces, drummer Rick Crowley moved to keyboards. The group brought in a new drummer, Eric Jackson, who was seventeen at the time. In October the Bluestars opened their own music club, the Gallows, in Remuera. They painted the walls in deep blue and adorned them group-themed images and artifacts. After numerous attempts to secure a club license, they were unable to secure one, but opened anyway, functioning without a proper permit. In an effort to keep outside noise to a minimum, the group always made sure to keep the windows closed during performances, but other bands did not take this precaution, and a rash of neighbour complaints forced them to finally shut down by year's end. In January 1967 they did a summer tour of various coastal resorts. In February, they released their last single, the music hall-influenced "I'm a Little Man" b/w "Sherlock Sweet". The B-side had a garage organ-based riff similar to that in ? and the Mysterians' "96 Tears". Like their previous effort, the single failed to chart. In March 1967 they broke up.

=== Later developments ===
John Harris moved on to composing and recording religious songs with St Paul's Singers and later became a successful television producer. Murray Savidan became a successful advertising agent, as well as professional photographer. Rick von Bokhoven became a graphic artist. Jim Crowley moved to Sydney and continued to be active in music, playing with several bands over the years. He died in 2001.

In the intervening years their work as come to the attention of garage rock enthusiasts, and has appeared in various compilations such as Wild Things, volume 1, Trans World Punk, Volume 2, and Ugly Things, Volume 3. The song "Social End Product" is particularly well-regarded. Ian Marks mentioned "...the Bluestars got to record their own genuine 100% original, garage punk classic, possibly the greatest '60s punk record of them all – the mighty 'Social End Product'".

== Membership ==
=== Early lineups 1962–1964 ===
- Murray Savidan (bass, vocals)
- John Harris (lead guitar, drums)
- Roger McLay (guitar)
- Rick von Bokhoven (vocals and guitar)
- Jim Crowley (drums)

=== 1965–1966 ===
- Murray Savidan (bass, vocals)
- John Harris (lead guitar,)
- Rick von Bokhoven (vocals and guitar)
- Jim Crowley (drums)

=== 1966–1967 ===
- Murray Savidan (bass, vocals)
- John Harris (lead guitar,)
- Jim Crowley (organ)
- Eric Jackson (drums)

== Discography ==
- "Please Be a Little Kind" b/w "I Can Take It" (Decca UK F-12303, December 1965) (Decca Australia DEC-361, February 1966)
- "Social End Product" b/w "I'm Over Here" (Allied JAR-540, September 1966)
- "I'm a Little Man" b/w "Sherlock Sweet" (Allied JAR-545, February 1967)
