= The Blue World =

1966 novel by Jack Vance

- First edition
- Author: Jack Vance
- Language: English
- Genre: Science fiction
- Publisher: Ballantine
- Publication date: 1966
- Publication place: United States
- Media type: Print (paperback)
- Pages: 190
- OCLC: 2304721

The Blue World is a science fiction adventure novel by American writer Jack Vance. The novel is based on Vance's earlier novella The Kragen, which appeared in the July 1964 edition of Fantastic.

== Plot summary ==
Sklar Hast, the protagonist, had achieved a measure of success and prosperity by passing his examination to be a "Hoodwink", or semaphore tower operator – a prestigious position on the Blue World, a planet with no land at all. During the space of twelve generations, the descendants of a crashed prison ship have created a rudimentary civilization on the water-covered planet, living on huge sea plants. They have a hierarchy of castes named after the different classes of criminal: the highest caste is the Incendiarists and the lowest is the Hooligans. They also have no idea that their ancestors were criminals, believing them to have been the victims of oppressors. They have evolved a peaceful society, and ignore the hints in texts saved from the first generation of what their origins actually were.

The world is mostly safe. However, they must beware the kragen, giant, semi-intelligent predators which roam the ocean. The colonists eventually develop a relationship with one of these, King Kragen. It drives off other kragen in return for offerings of food organized by an entrenched quasi-religious priesthood built up over generations. King Kragen grows to become the largest and most powerful kragen, demanding more and more food as time goes by.

When Sklar questions the need to continue to worship and feed this predator, King Kragen appears, wrecks his home and kills his mentor. Rather than regard this as divine punishment, Sklar suspects that the conservative priesthood has enough control over King Kragen to kill those who oppose their views, and to thus uphold their privileged status.

Sklar's mission is to convince his fellow citizens that they must kill King Kragen in order to be free. And, if so, to discover how can they do it in a world without materials to make weapons.

== Reception ==
Stanisław Lem criticised the novel's technological aspects as being highly unrealistic.

== Awards ==
The Blue World was nominated for the Nebula Award in 1966. It was also a preliminary nominee for the Prometheus Award, which honors "Classic Libertarian SF Novels", in 1988, 1994, 1995 and 1996.

== Sources ==
- Underwood, Tim; Chuck Miller (1980). Jack Vance. New York: Taplinger Publishing Company. p. 228. ISBN 0-8008-4295-2.
