= BlueStar PR =

Nonprofit organization

Coordinates: 37°47′20.5″N 122°23′59.8″W

Blue Star poster, 2008.

BlueStar (formerly "BlueStar PR"), "The Jewish Ink Tank", is a San Francisco-based nonprofit organization which produces "visual media that strengthens existing efforts to gain popular support and interest for Israel and Judaism." Blue Star creates and distributes pro-Israel posters, rally signs, postcards, and brochures. They also put up transit shelter ads and billboards. They also host Write On For Israel/San Francisco, a one-year program to training future Israel leaders and advocates. The program is available for high school students, college students, and adults.

== History ==
According to its website, BlueStar PR was founded in 2003, and was originally funded by the Richard and Rhoda Goldman Fund. It has since changed its name to "BlueStar" and has become a non-profit organization which solicits donations.
