= Blue Giant Equipment Corporation =

- Founded: 1963
- Headquarters: Toronto, Ontario, Canada
- Website: Blue Giant

Blue Giant Equipment Corporation is a loading dock equipment manufacturer with corporate headquarters in Toronto, Ontario, Canada.

== History ==
Blue Giant Equipment Corporation was founded in 1963 and initially specialized in the manufacture of dock levellers and hand pallet trucks. Later, the company expanded to other loading dock solutions, such as intelligent dock controls and air-powered loading dock equipment. In 2005, Blue Giant launched the XDS3000 (Extra Dock Safety) Series, a combination that consisted of a dock leveller, vehicle restraint, and dock lip barrier that protected closed overhead doors from impact damage, the first 3-in-1 equipment offering.

== Recognition ==
In 2009, Blue Giant was voted #1 in the Professional Door Dealer magazine's Best of Business Dealers Choice Poll in the Loading Dock Equipment category. Blue Giant's StrongArm SVR303 hydraulic vehicle restraint won the Bronze Award in the Material Handling Systems category of Plant Engineering magazine's 2009 Product of the Year awards.
