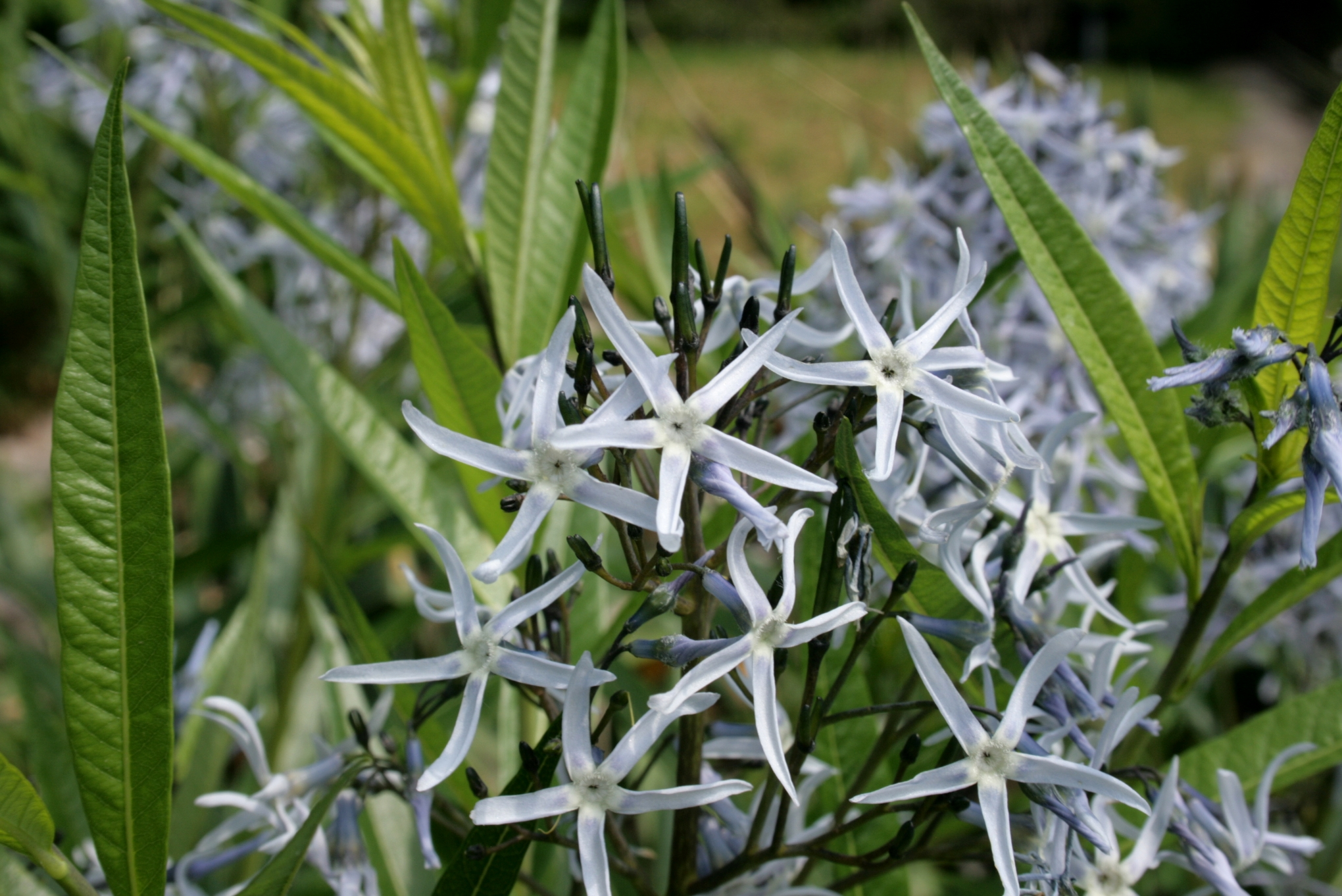
- Amsonia tabernaemontana

Scientific classification
- Kingdom: Plantae
- Clade: Tracheophytes
- Clade: Angiosperms
- Clade: Eudicots
- Clade: Asterids
- Order: Gentianales
- Family: Apocynaceae
- Subfamily: Rauvolfioideae
- Tribe: Amsonieae; M.E.Endress
- Genus: Amsonia; Walter

Synonyms
- Ansonia Raf.

= Amsonia =

Genus of flowering plants

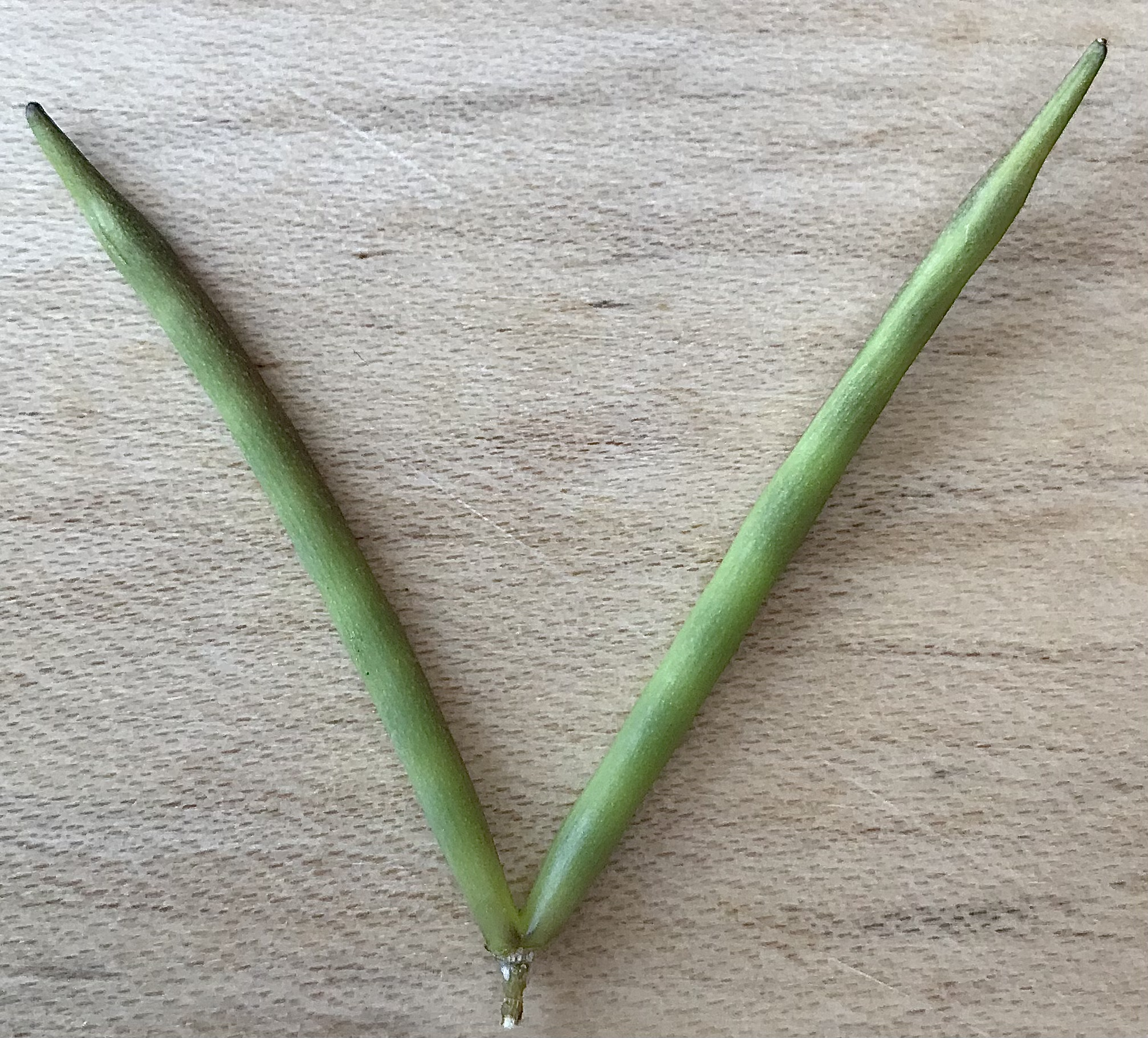
Single paired follicle (i.e. V-shaped pair of follicles) detached from specimen of Amsonia tabernaemontana

Amsonia is a genus of flowering plants in the dogbane family, Apocynaceae, first described as a genus in 1788. It is native primarily to North America with one species in East Asia and another in the eastern Mediterranean. It was named in honor of the American physician John Amson. Members of the genus are commonly known as bluestars.

Species

1. Amsonia ciliata Walter – fringed bluestar – SE US, S Great Plains
2. Amsonia elliptica (Thunb. ex Murray) Roem. & Schult. – Japanese bluestar – China, Japan, Korea
3. Amsonia fugatei S.P.McLaughlin – San Antonio bluestar – New Mexico
4. Amsonia grandiflora Alexander – Arizona bluestar – Arizona, Sonora, Durango
5. Amsonia hubrichtii Woodson – Hubricht's bluestar – Arkansas, Oklahoma
6. Amsonia illustris Woodson – Ozark bluestar – Mississippi Valley, also Nevada
7. Amsonia jonesii Woodson – Jones' bluestar – Arizona, New Mexico, Utah, Colorado
8. Amsonia kearneyana Woodson – Kearney's bluestar – Baboquivari in Pima Co. in Arizona
9. Amsonia longiflora Torr. – tubular bluestar – Arizona, New Mexico, Texas, Coahuila
10. Amsonia ludoviciana Vail – Louisiana bluestar – Louisiana, Mississippi, Georgia
11. Amsonia orientalis Decne. – European bluestar – Greece, Turkey
12. Amsonia palmeri A.Gray – Palmer's bluestar – Arizona, New Mexico, Texas, Sonora, Chihuahua
13. Amsonia peeblesii Woodson – Peebles' bluestar – Arizona
14. Amsonia repens Shinners – creeping bluestar – E Texas, SW Louisiana
15. Amsonia rigida Shuttlw. ex Small – stiff bluestar – from Georgia to Louisiana
16. Amsonia tabernaemontana Walter – eastern bluestar – S + C + E United States
17. Amsonia tharpii Woodson – feltleaf bluestar – W Texas, SE New Mexico
18. Amsonia tomentosa Torr. & Frém. – woolly bluestar – SW US; Chihuahua
