= John Amson =

English-American politician (1698-?)

Mayor of Williamsburg, Virginia
- In office 1750–1751

Personal details
- Born: 1698 England
- Died: circa 1765 Virginia
- Occupation: Physician, alterman, mayor

John Amson (1698 – death unknown, possibly 1765) was an English physician and amateur botanist who moved to Virginia and served as alderman and mayor of Williamsburg, during the Colonial period, from 1750 to 1751.

== Biography ==
Amson owned lots 212–217 in Williamsburg from 1746 to around 1758. In 1762, he bought 180 acres of land from Henry Tyler, of the noted Tyler family.

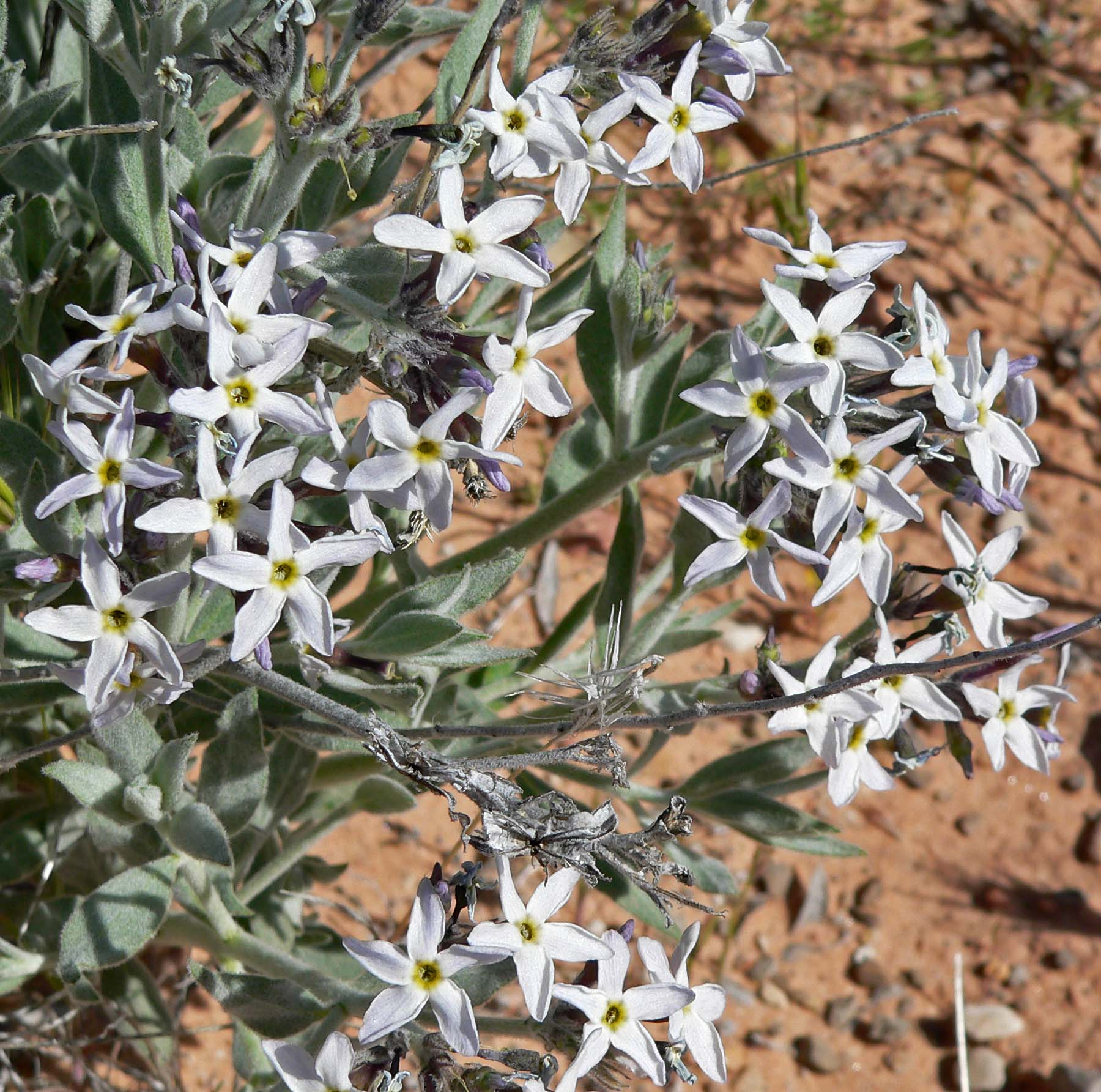
Amsonia flower

In 1760, a perennial flower, the genus of Amsonia Blue Star, was named after Amson. It came about after then-General George Washington, on campaign during the French and Indian War, contracted what he believed to be the consumption, called tuberculosis today. In 1758, on his way to Williamsburg, Washington sought a definitive answer as to his illness, stopped for a medical consultation at the Governor's Palace, where Dr. Amson lived on the north-west edge of town. Amson diagnosed Washington with a common cold and convinced him he was not going to die.

== Legacy ==
To commemorate Amson, John Clayton, clerk of courts for Gloucester County and author of the book Flora Virginica, named the native flora Amsonia after the doctor, and sent the seeds to botanist John Bartram for his seed and plant business.

Preceded by Incomplete record	Mayor of Williamsburg, Virginia; 1750–1751	Succeeded by Incomplete record
