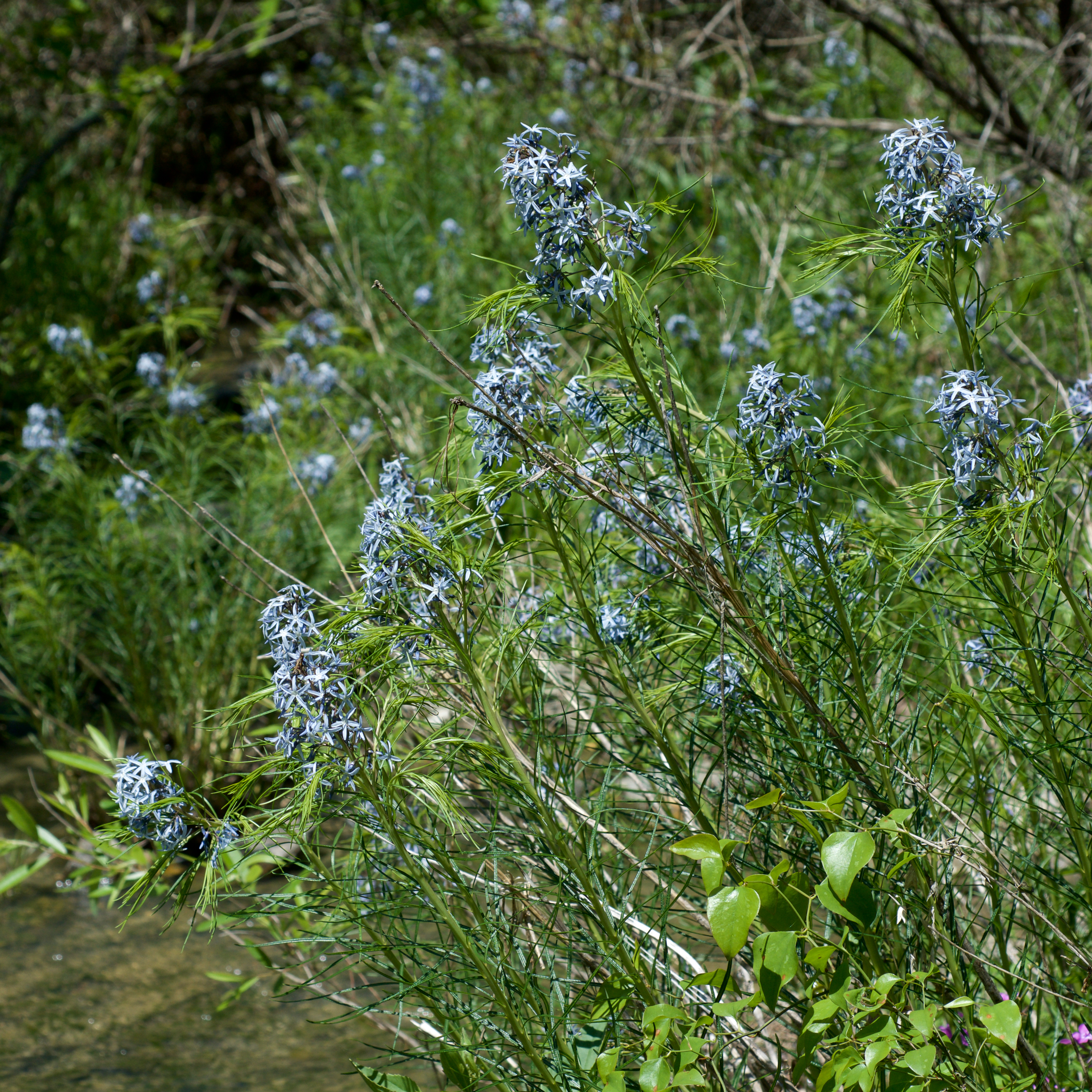

Conservation status
- Vulnerable (NatureServe)

Scientific classification
- Kingdom: Plantae
- Clade: Tracheophytes
- Clade: Angiosperms
- Clade: Eudicots
- Clade: Asterids
- Order: Gentianales
- Family: Apocynaceae
- Genus: Amsonia
- Species: A. hubrichtii

Binomial name
- Amsonia hubrichtii Woodson 1943

= Amsonia hubrichtii =

Species of flowering plant

Amsonia hubrichtii, commonly known as Hubricht's bluestar, Arkansas bluestar, or thread-leaf bluestar, is a North American species of perennial flowering plant in the Apocynaceae (dogbane) family, first described in 1943. It is native to Oklahoma and Arkansas in the south-central United States. It is commonly used as an ornamental plant.

== Description ==
A. hubrechtii grows 60–90 centimetres (2–3 ft) high with upright stems that form bushy clumps. Leaves are very narrow, numerous, and alternate, giving the plant a feathery appearance. In the spring the leaves are bright green, and they turn gold in the fall. The flowers, borne in clusters at the end of each stem in the spring, are a powdery blue color and 1.3 centimetres (.5 in) across. The flowers have 5 petals and fade to white with warmer temperatures.

== Distribution and habitat ==
The plant is known from a limited number of populations in Oklahoma and Arkansas, primarily within the Ouachita Mountains Natural Division. In Oklahoma, it is considered an endangered species. It grows well in poor soils and full to partial sun.

== Gallery ==
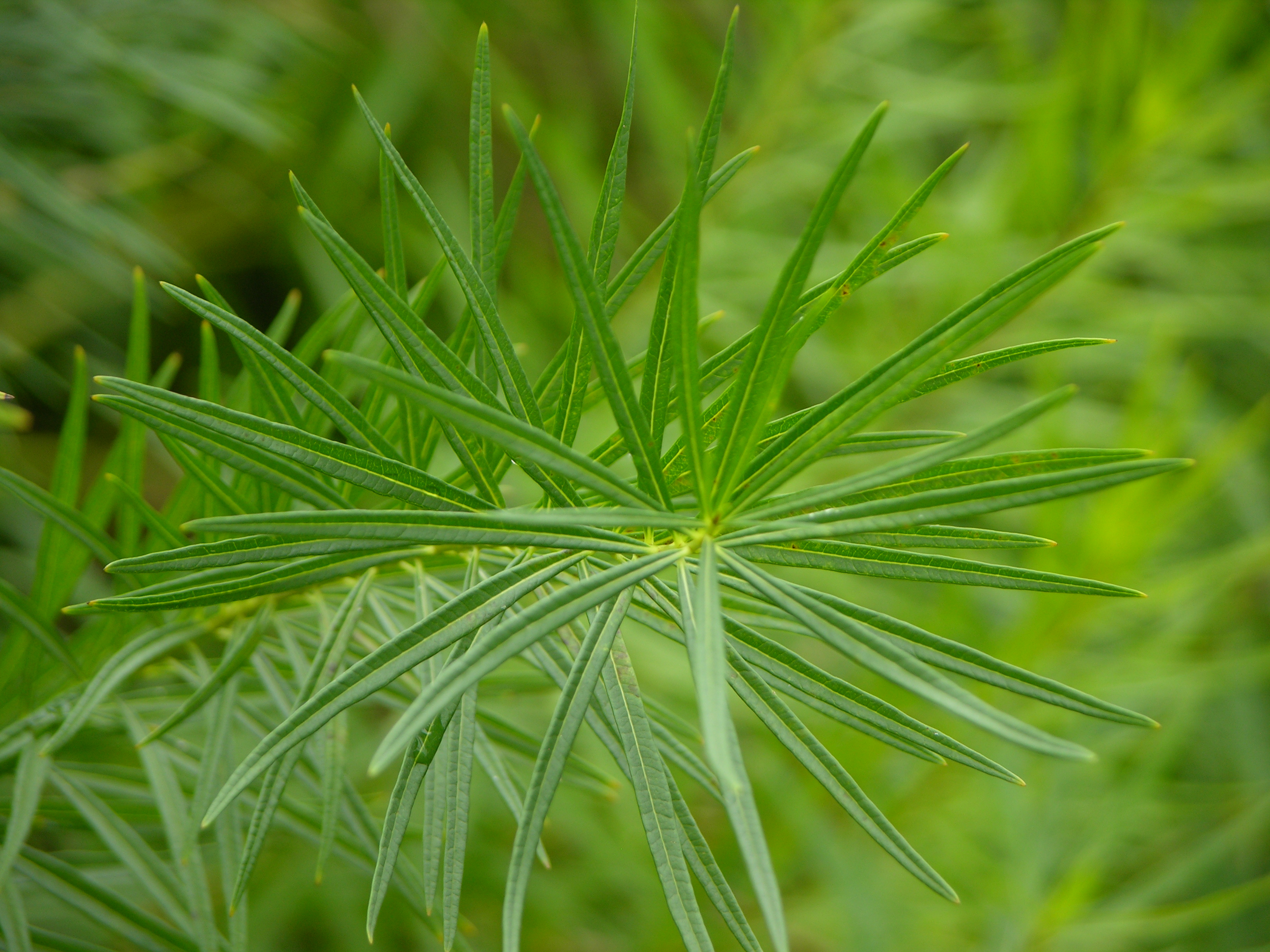

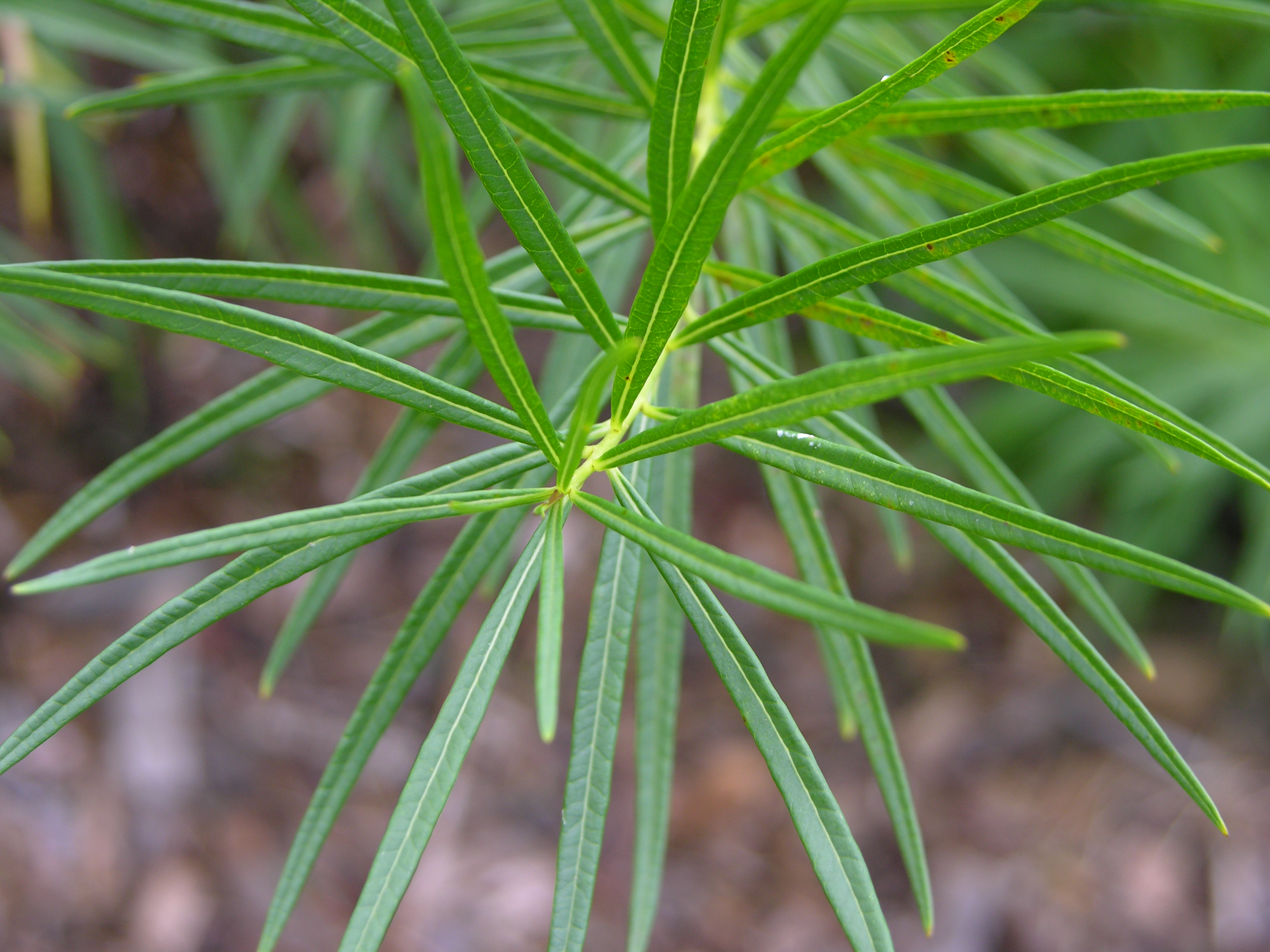
