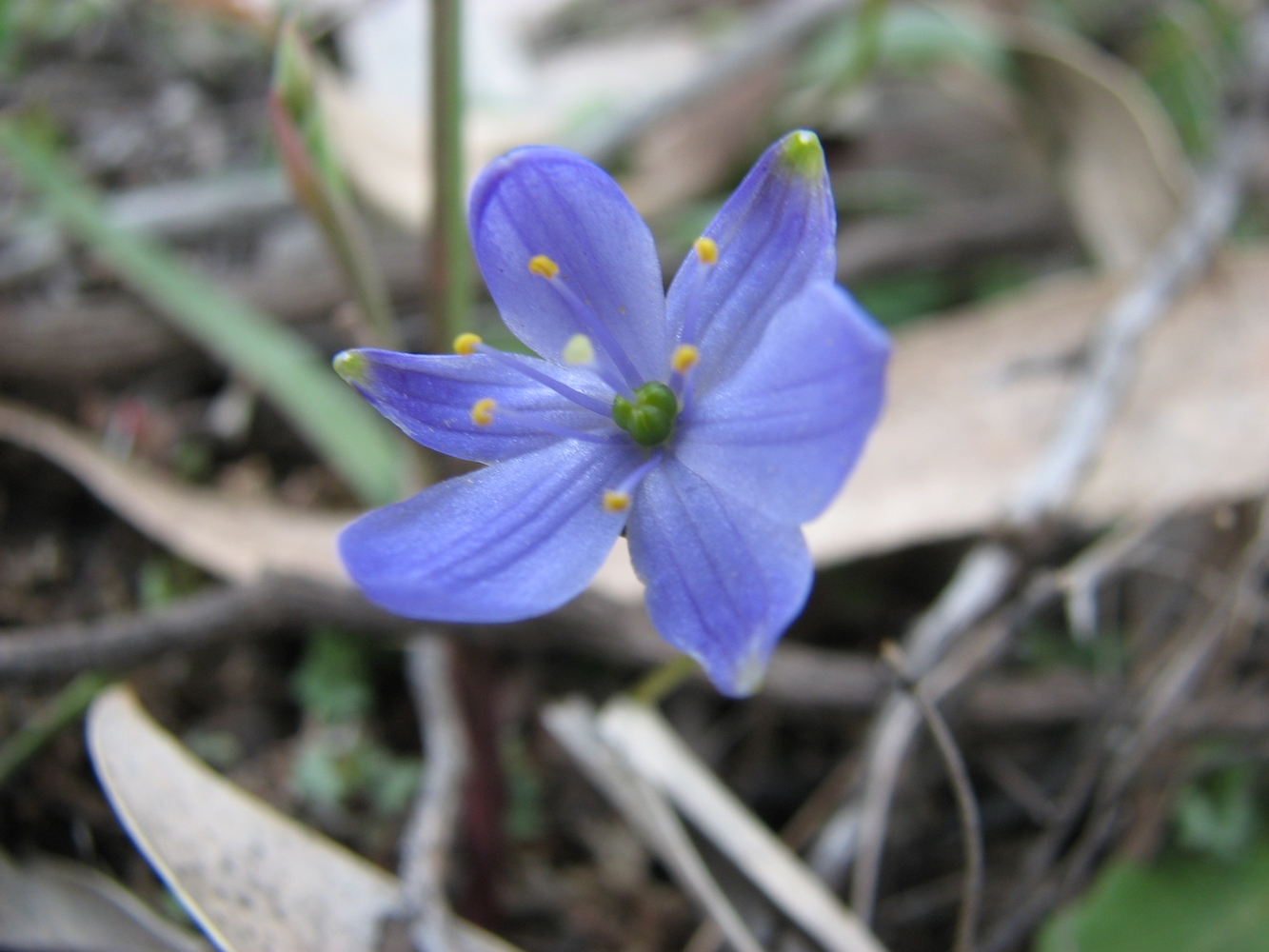
- Chamaescilla corymbosa at Kooyoora State Park, Victoria

Scientific classification
- Kingdom: Plantae
- Clade: Embryophytes
- Clade: Tracheophytes
- Clade: Angiosperms
- Clade: Monocots
- Order: Asparagales
- Family: Asphodelaceae
- Subfamily: Hemerocallidoideae
- Genus: Chamaescilla
- Species: C. corymbosa

Binomial name
- Chamaescilla corymbosa (R.Br.) F.Muell. ex Benth.

Synonyms
- Caesia corymbosa R.Br.

= Chamaescilla corymbosa =

Species of plant

Chamaescilla corymbosa, commonly known as blue stars, blue squill or mudrurt, is a tuberous perennial herb species in the genus Chamaescilla. It is endemic to southern Australia.

Plants are 10 to 15 cm high and have grass-like basal leaves The bright blue flowers have 6 petals (each with three nerves) and 6 stamens. These appear in groups of two or more are produced from August to October in the species' native range. The seed capsules contain black, glossy seeds.

There are two currently recognised varieties:

- C. corymbosa (R.Br.) F.Muell. ex Benth. var. corymbosa
- C. corymbosa var. paradoxa (Endl.) R.J.F.Hend.

The species occurs in Western Australia, South Australia, Victoria and Tasmania.
