= Blue main-sequence star =

Blue main-sequence star may refer to:

- O-type main-sequence star, main sequence stars ranging above 30,000 K
- B-type main-sequence star, main sequence stars ranging from 10,000 to 30,000 K

== See also ==
- White main-sequence star
- Blue subdwarf
- Blue star
