= White Star, Kentucky =

Unincorporated community in Kentucky, United States

White Star
- Unincorporated community
- Location within the state of Kentucky White Star (the United States)
- Coordinates: 36°49′39″N 83°22′00″W
- Country: United States
- State: Kentucky
- County: Harlan
- Elevation: 1,276 ft (389 m)
- Time zone: UTC-6 (Eastern (EST))
  - Summer (DST): UTC-5 (EST)
- GNIS feature ID: 2565852

White Star was an unincorporated community and Coal town in Harlan County, Kentucky, United States.
