= Blue dwarf =

The term blue dwarf refers to various types of stars having a peak emission in blue or ultraviolet. Those can be:

== Astronomical objects ==
- A blue compact dwarf galaxy
- An early-type main-sequence star
  - B-type main-sequence star
  - O-type main-sequence star
  - OB star
- Blue dwarf (red-dwarf stage), a hypothetical stage in red dwarf interstellar evolution
- O-type subdwarf
- B-type subdwarf

== See also ==
- Blue star (disambiguation)
- Blue giant (disambiguation)
