= Blue world =

Blue world may refer to:

- "Blue World", a 1983 song by The Moody Blues
- "Blue World", a 2013 song by super Junior
- "Blue World", a 2020 song by Mac Miller
- The Blue World, a 1966 SF novel by Jack Vance
- Jonathan Bird's Blue World, a 2008 marine biology TV series
- Endless Ocean: Blue World, a 2007 Wii video game
- Blue World, a 2019 album of 1964 John Coltrane recordings
- Blue World, a 1996 SF manga series by Yukinobu Hoshino

== See also ==
- Big Blue World, 1984 Paul Haig single
- Dark Blue World, 2001 Czech film
- In Blue World Tour, 2004 world tour by The Corrs
- Love is Blue, whose English lyrics contain the phrase "my world is blue".
