= Blue Star (company) =

Indian multinational home appliances company

Blue Star Limited
- Type: Public
- Traded as: BSE: 500067; NSE: BLUESTARCO
- ISIN: INE472A01039
- Industry: Home appliances
- Founded: 1943; 83 years ago
- Founder: Mohan T Advani
- Headquarters: Mumbai, Maharashtra, India
- Area served: Worldwide
- Key people: Shailesh Haribhakti (Chairman); Vir S Advani (Vice Chairman & MD); B Thiagarajan (MD)
- Products: Air conditioners; Air coolers; Refrigerators; Washing machines; Cold storage, water purifier; Microwaves; Air purifiers; Water dispensers
- Revenue: ▲₹6,081 crore (US$630 million) (2022)
- Operating income: ▲₹296 crore (US$31 million) (2022)
- Net income: ▲₹166 crore (US$17 million) (2022)
- Total assets: ▲₹4,312 crore (US$450 million) (2022)
- Total equity: ▲₹998 crore (US$100 million) (2022)
- Number of employees: 2,800+ (2022)
- Website: www.bluestarindia.com

Blue Star Ltd is an Indian multinational home appliances company, headquartered in Mumbai. It specializes in air conditioning, commercial refrigeration and MEP. It is the country's second largest homegrown company in the air conditioning space.

== History ==
Blue Star was founded in 1943 by Mohan T Advani as a reconditioning company. Soon after inception, Blue Star ventured into the manufacturing of ice candy machines and bottle coolers and began the design, execution of central air conditioning projects, followed by the manufacturing of water coolers. The company later expanded into new product lines and began exporting to Dubai. It went public in 1969 with an initial public offering, listing on the Bombay Stock Exchange. In the late 2000s, Blue Star ventured into the electrical, plumbing and fire-fighting contracting businesses, offering customers an integrated mechanical, electrical, and plumbing (MEP) solution. It then forayed into the residential air conditioning segment a few years later, along with entering the water and air purification segments as well as the engineering facility management (EFM) space recently.

== Manufacturing and operations ==
Blue Star has four manufacturing plants, which are located in Dadra, Kala Amb, Wada, and Ahmedabad. In addition, the company is currently in the process of setting up a plant in Sri City.

Blue Star has a presence in 18 countries in the Middle East, Africa, SAARC and ASEAN regions. Blue Star has three Joint Ventures in Oman, Qatar and Malaysia. The company has subsidiaries in UAE, Qatar and India. The company serves the Middle East market via its UAE subsidiary. The company's subsidiary in India is called Blue Star Engineering & Electronics Ltd
