= Thomas Walter (botanist) =

American botanist (1740–1789)

- Born: c. 1740; Hampshire, England
- Died: 17 January 1789
- Scientific career
- Fields: Botany

Thomas Walter (c. 1740 – 17 January 1789) was an American botanist best known for his book Flora Caroliniana (1788), the first flora set in North America to utilize the Linnaean system of classification.

== Life and career ==
Walter was born in Hampshire, England, around 1740. Little is known of his family background or early life. He evidently received a good education but no details are available. Sometime before 1769 he arrived in Charleston, South Carolina, where he worked as a merchant. He later acquired a rice plantation on the Santee River in present-day Berkeley County where he lived for the rest of his life.

Walter's quiet farmer's life was positioned in tempestuous the American Revolutionary period. His academic devotion to science led him to become interested in botany and he undertook a detailed plant survey within a fifty-mile radius of his home, collecting seeds for his garden and building an extensive herbarium. Based on this effort, Walter completed a manuscript in 1787 containing a summary of all the flowering plant species found in the region. It was the first comprehensive regional flora set in eastern North America and the first to use Linnaeus' binomial naming conventions. Walter gave the manuscript to fellow-botanist John Fraser who took it to England and arranged for its publication in 1788. Flora Caroliniana provided brief Latin descriptions for over 1,000 plant species in 435 genera.

Walter is credited with the discovery of some 200 new species and four new genera. Today, 88 of these species and one genus (Amsonia) still bear the valid names provided by Walter in his Flora.

Walter died on 17 January 1789, shortly after the publication of his flora. His herbarium was taken to England by Fraser and eventually purchased by the British Museum of Natural History where it still exists. Since his death, eight plant species have been named in his honor.
