= Fodina stola =

Scientific classification
- Kingdom: Animalia
- Phylum: Arthropoda
- Clade: Pancrustacea
- Class: Insecta
- Order: Lepidoptera
- Superfamily: Noctuoidea
- Family: Erebidae
- Genus: Fodina
- Species: F. stola

Binomial name
- Fodina stola Guenée, 1852

Synonyms
- Artena stola (Guenée, 1852)

Species of moth

Fodina stola is a moth of the family Noctuidae first described by Achille Guenée in 1852. It is found in India and Sri Lanka. Caterpillars are known to feed on Anogeissus latifolia, Cassia fistula, Holarrhena antidysenterica, Holarrhena pubescens and Tabernaemontana heyneana.
