= Kurchi bark =

Kurchi bark is a common name for several plants and may refer to:

- Holarrhena floribunda
- Holarrhena pubescens
