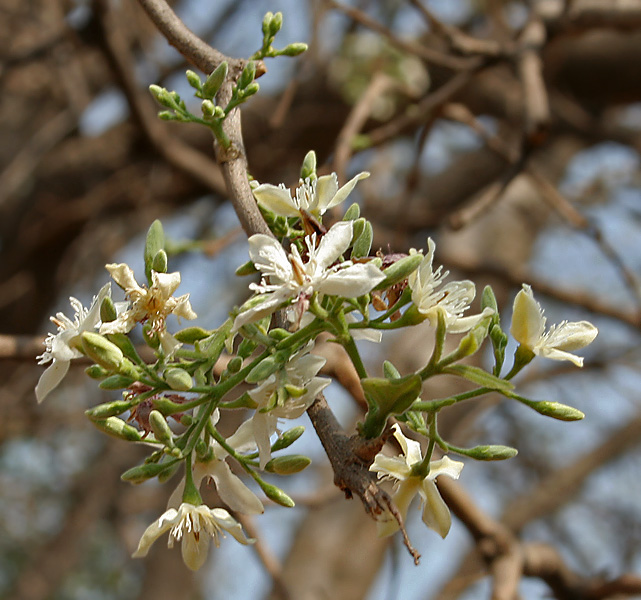
- Flowers

Scientific classification
- Kingdom: Plantae
- Clade: Tracheophytes
- Clade: Angiosperms
- Clade: Eudicots
- Clade: Asterids
- Order: Gentianales
- Family: Apocynaceae
- Genus: Wrightia
- Species: W. tinctoria

Binomial name
- Wrightia tinctoria (Roxb.) R.Br., Mem. Wern. Soc. 173. 1809.

= Wrightia tinctoria =

Species of flowering plant

Wrightia tinctoria, Pala indigo plant or dyer's oleander, is a flowering plant species in the genus Wrightia found in India, southeast Asia and Australia. It is found in dry and moist regions in its distribution. Various parts of the plant have been used in traditional medicine, but there is no scientific evidence it is effective or safe for treating any disease.

== Description ==
=== Morphology ===
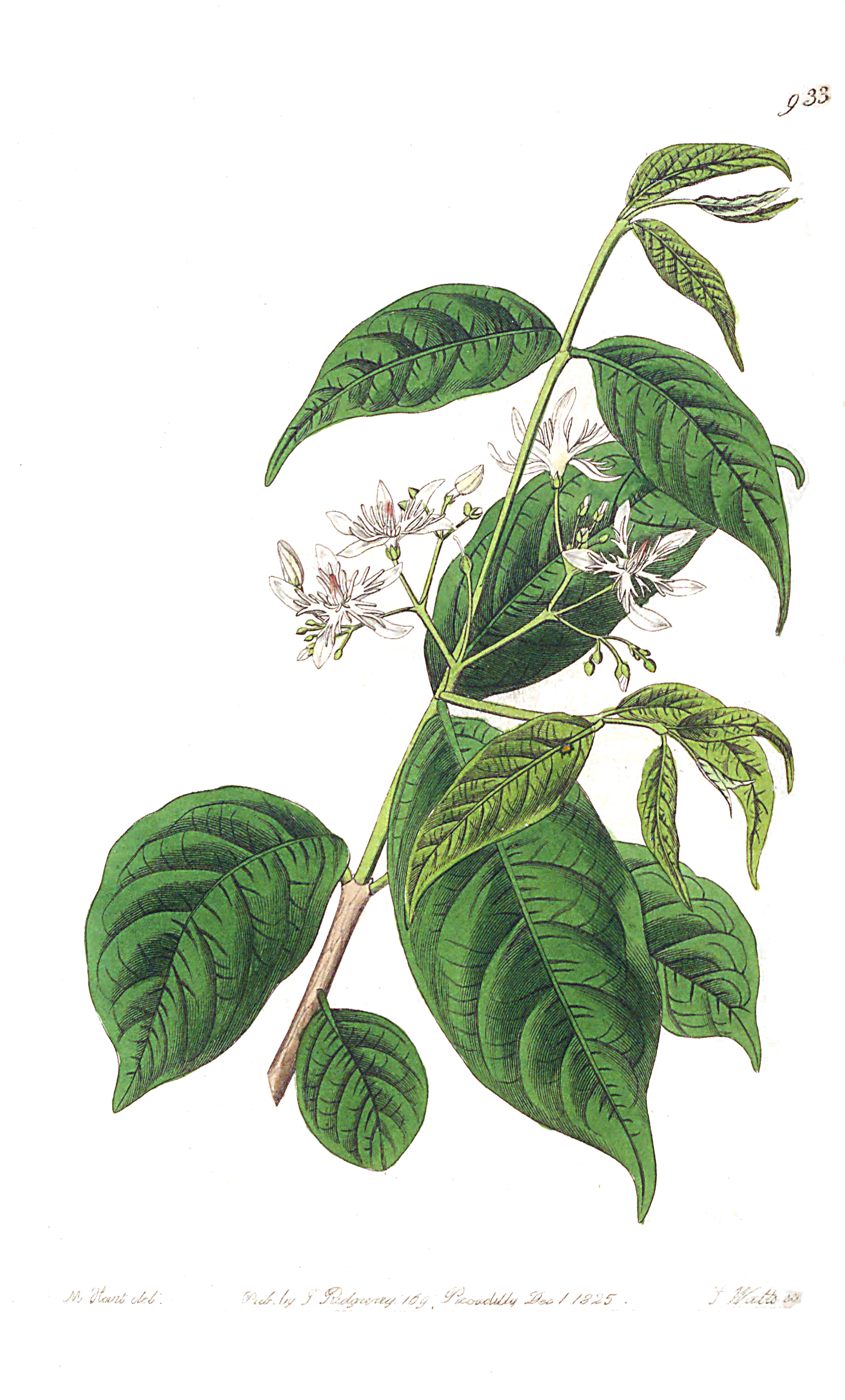
Illustration from The Botanical Register showing leaves and flowers

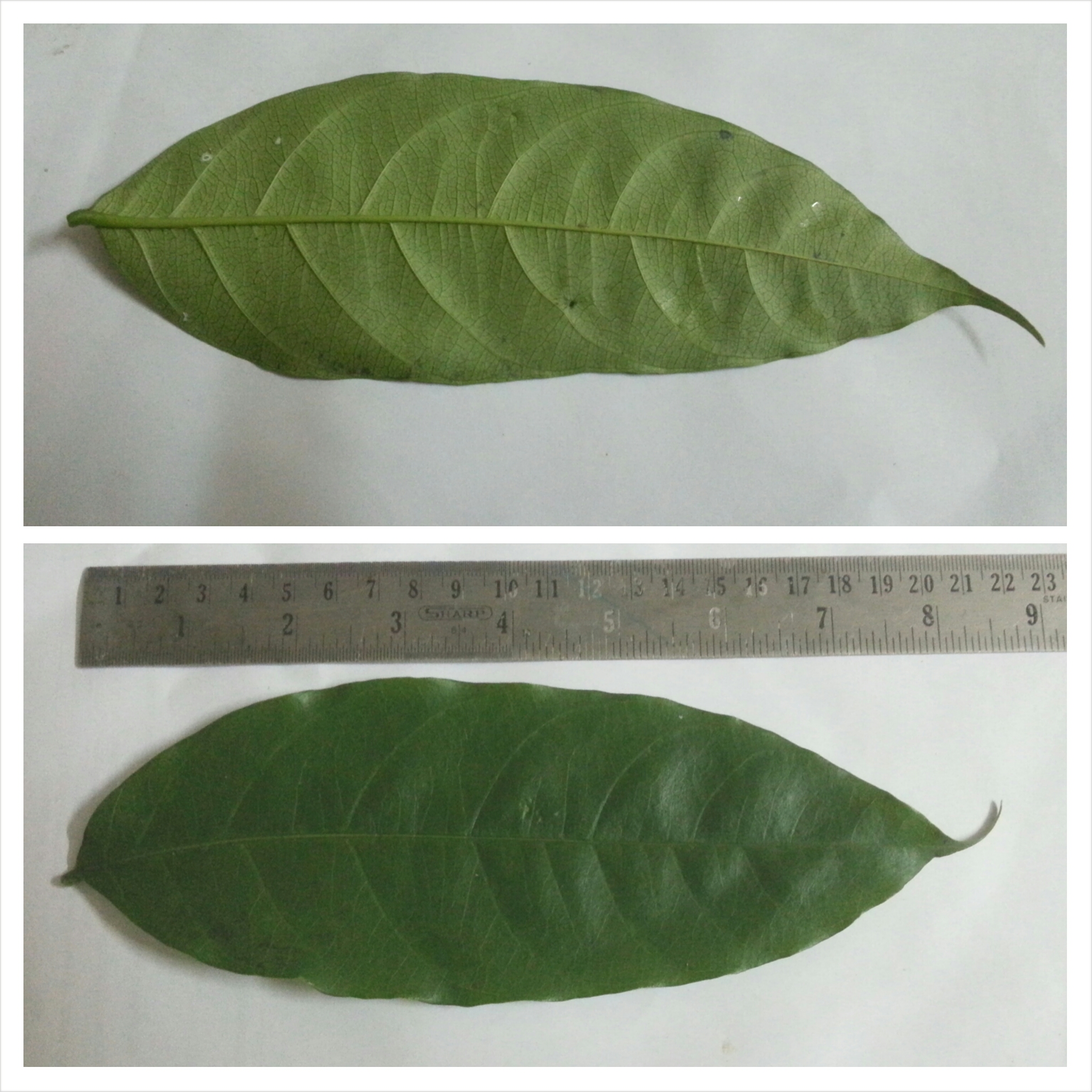
Leaves of W. tinctoria

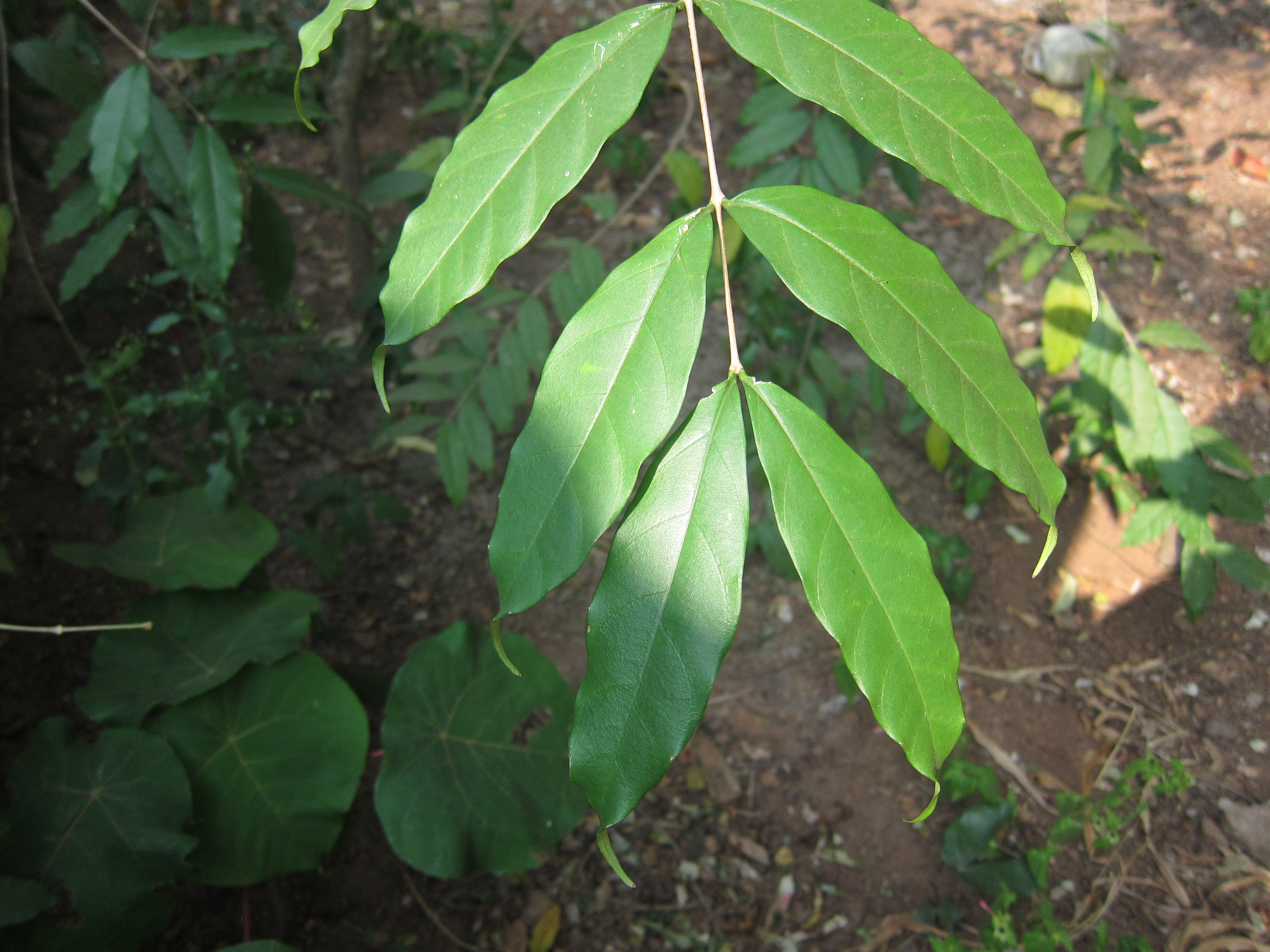
Simple leaves with opposite leaf arrangement. Upper leaves are glabrous.

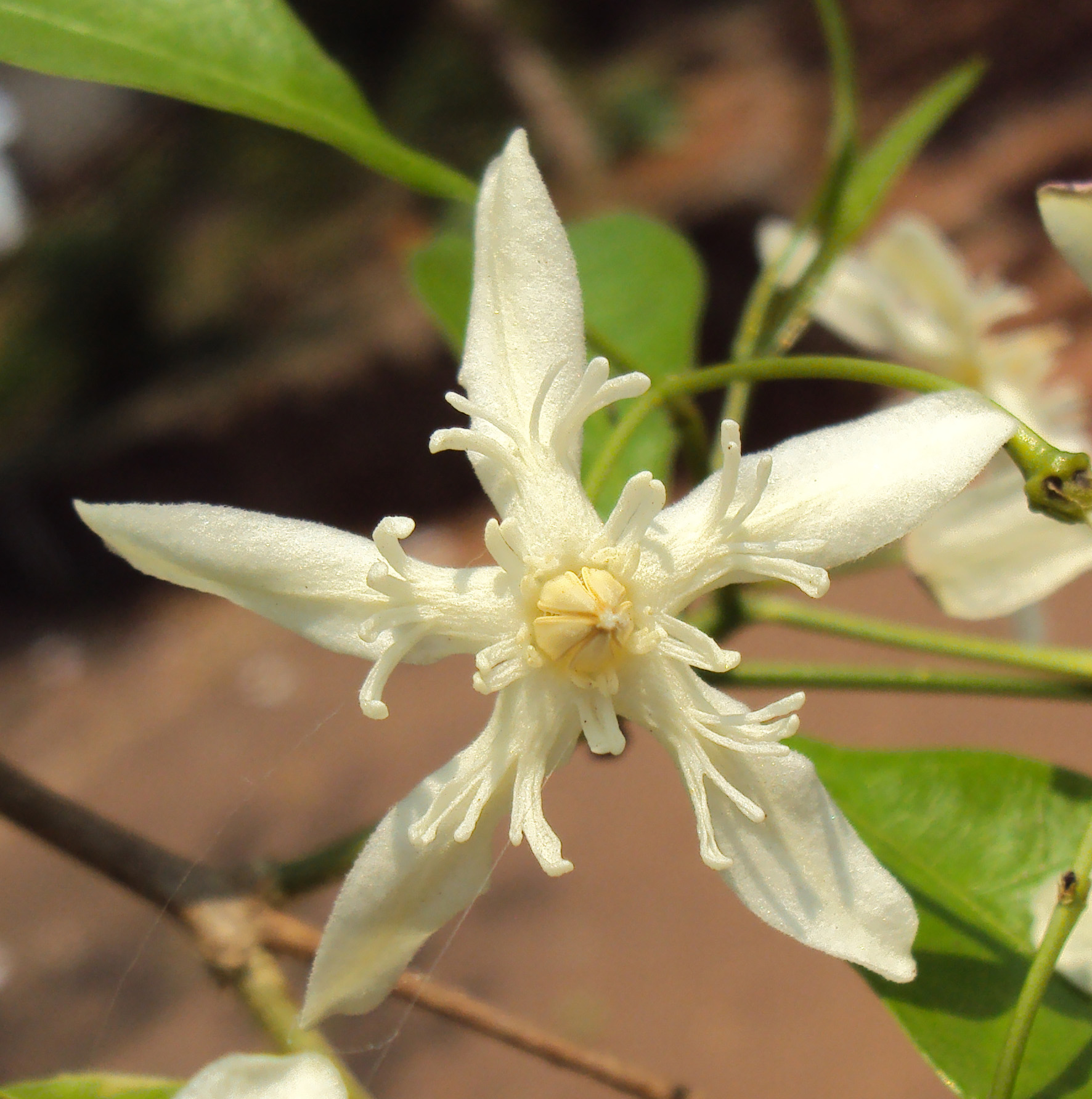
Close-up of the white flowers. Flowers are insect pollinated.

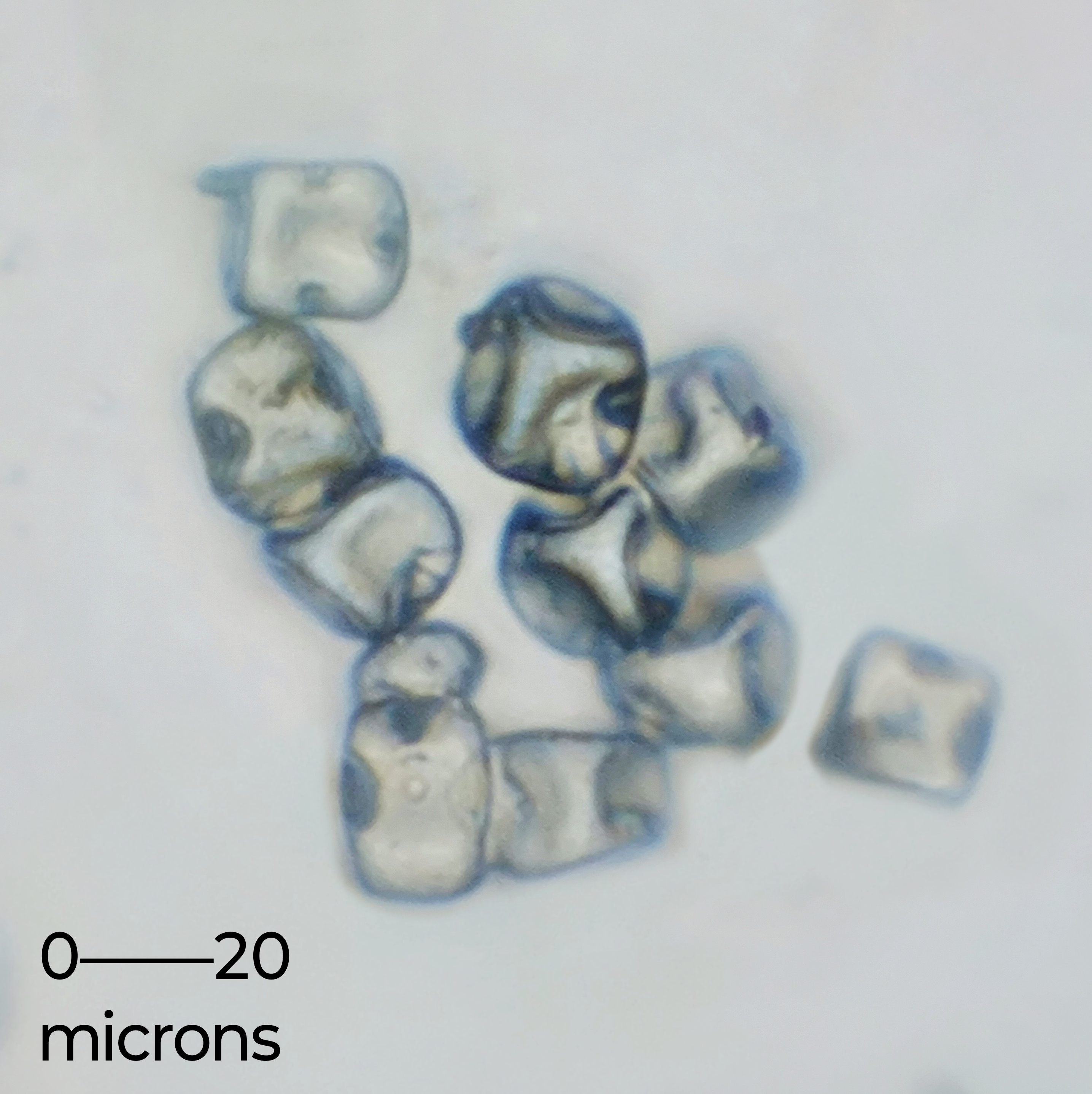
Pollen grains

It is a small to medium-sized deciduous shrub or tree, ranging from 3–15 m (10–49 ft) in height but also reaching up to 18 m. The bark is smooth, yellowish-brown and about 10 mm thick, producing a milky-white latex. Leaves are simple, oppositely arranged, ovate, obtusely acuminate and are 10–20 cm long and 5 cm wide. Leaves are glabrous and sometimes pubescent beneath. Leaf stalks are very short. The flowers appear (in India) from March to May, peaking from April to June. White flowers appear in corymb-like cymes, 5–15 cm across, at the end of branches. Flowers have five white petals 2–3 cm long which turn creamish yellow as they age. The flowers have oblong petals which are rounded at the tip, and are similar to flowers of frangipani. Fruiting is in August and the fruit is cylindrical, blackish-green speckled with white, long horn-like and united at tip. The seeds are brown and flat with bunch of white hairs. Seed dispersal is by wind and pollination is by insects. In his 1862 book on timber trees of South Asia, Edward Balfour mentions its distribution across the then Madras Presidency of British India especially in the Coimbatore jungles, and reports that it was "very common in all forests of Bombay". In the same book, Balfour quotes William Roxburgh's comparison of the whiteness of the wood as "coming nearer to ivory than any I know". Earlier in 1824, the plant specimens were presented by the British East India Company to the Royal Horticultural Society as illustrated and recorded in botanical register founded by Sydenham Edwards and at the time published by James Ridgway.

=== Phytochemistry ===
The plant contains wrightial, a triterpenoid phytochemical, along with cycloartenone, cycloeucalenol, β-amyrin, and β-sitosterol isolated from the methanol extract of the immature seed pods.

== Taxonomy ==
The following are considered to be synonyms of Wrightia tinctoria:

- Allamanda verticillata Desf.
- Alstonia oleandrifolia Lodd.
- Nerium jaspideum Span. Invalid
- Cerium tinctorium Sweet Illegitimate
- Cerium tinctorium Roxb.
- Wrightia laciniata A.DC.
- Wrightia timorensis Miq.
- Wrightia tinctoria subsp. tinctoria

== Distribution and habitat ==
It is mainly found in Australia, India, Myanmar, Nepal, Timor and Vietnam. Within India, it is found in most of the peninsular and central India except the northern and north-eastern states.

== Ecology ==
It is a slow to moderate-growing plant. Plants commence flowering when about 5–8 years old. It grows in a wide range of soil types ranging from arid, semi-arid, gravely or rocky soils and moist regions, especially on dry sandy sites or hillsides and valleys. The tree responds well to coppicing, and also produces root suckers. It tolerates moderate shading and is often found as undergrowth in deciduous forests. It also tolerates high uranium levels in soils. In India, the fungus Cercospora wrightia is known to cause leaf spot disease of Wrightia tinctoria.

== Uses ==
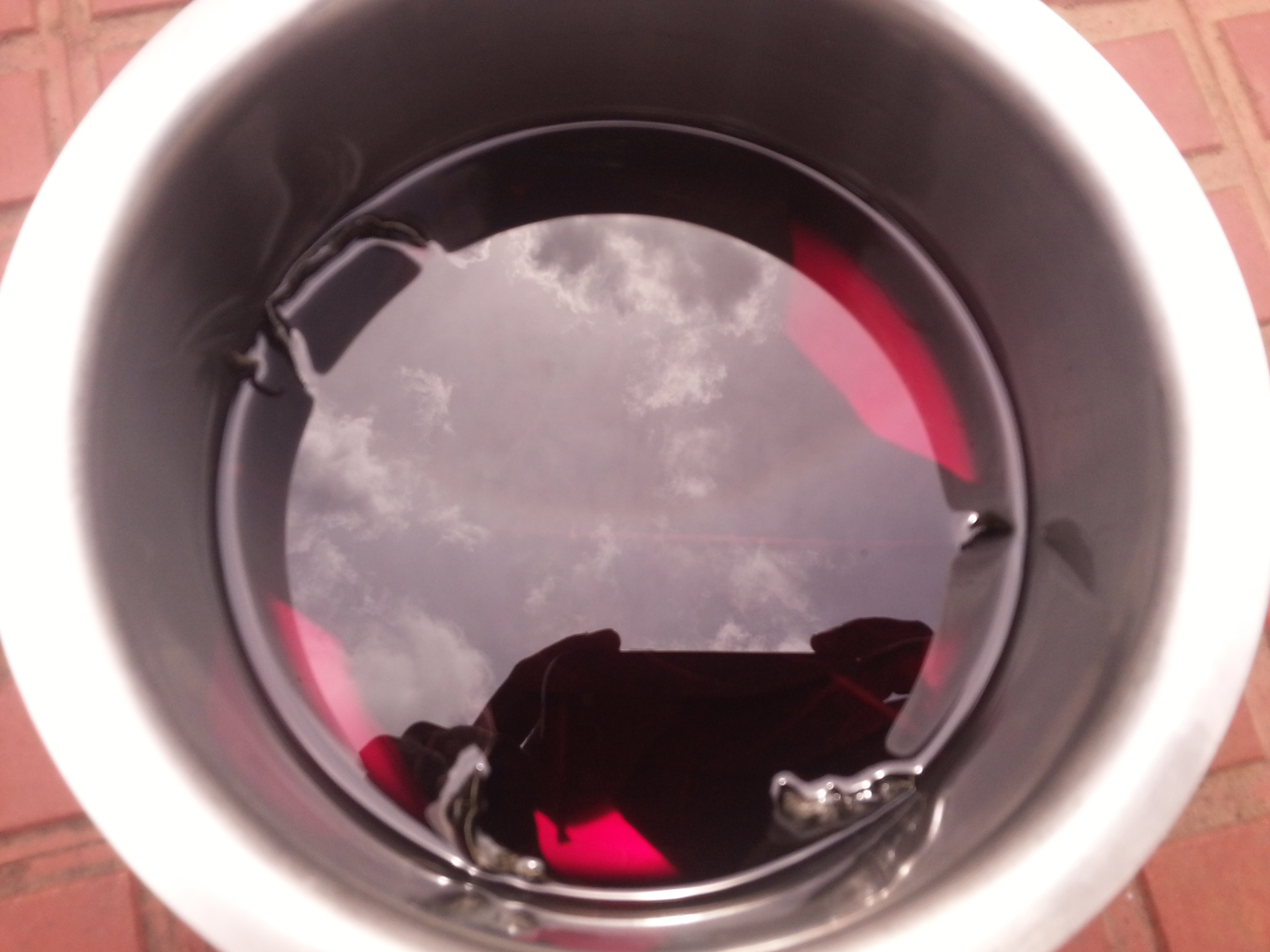
Wrightia tinctoria oil in sunlight

The flowers, leaves, fruits and seeds are edible. The tree is harvested from the wild as a medicine and source of a dye and wood. Leaves are extracted as fodder for livestock. The leaves, flowers, fruits and roots are sources of indigo-yielding glucoside, which produces a blue dye or indigo- like dye. About 100–200 kilos of leaves are needed to prepare 1 kilo of dye. It is occasionally planted as an ornamental in the tropics. The branches are trampled into the puddle soil in rice field for green manuring. It is recommended as a good agroforestry species as it intercrops well. High levels of extraction is resulting in it becoming scarce in some regions. The sap added to milk has been reported to have preservative properties; the milk will remain fresh for some time, the taste remaining unaltered.

=== Traditional medicine ===
In Ayurveda and other traditional medicine practices, the plant is called shwetha kutaja and its seeds are called indrayava or indrajava. There is no high-quality clinical evidence that it is safe or has any beneficial effect.

=== Wood-working ===
The white wood is used for turnery, carving, toy making, matchboxes, small boxes and furniture. The wood of Wrightia tinctoria, colloquially called Aale mara (ivory-wood), is used extensively in Channapatna (a toy town of India) for carving and lacquer work of world famous Channapatna toys. The timber is high in quality and valuable.

== See also ==
- Wrightia antidysenterica
