= Wrightiadione =

Names
- Preferred IUPAC name Indeno[2,1-b][1]benzopyran-6,11-dione

Identifiers
CAS Number	148180-61-4
3D model (JSmol)	Interactive image
ChemSpider	8597534
PubChem CID	10422105
UNII	KWW2264QDT
CompTox Dashboard (EPA)	DTXSID70439666
- InChI: InChI=1S/C16H8O3/c17-14-11-7-3-4-8-12(11)19-16-13(14)9-5-1-2-6-10(9)15(16)18/h1-8H Key: CXXCRLLJRGEAJV-UHFFFAOYSA-N; InChI=1/C16H8O3/c17-14-11-7-3-4-8-12(11)19-16-13(14)9-5-1-2-6-10(9)15(16)18/h1-8H Key: CXXCRLLJRGEAJV-UHFFFAOYAQ
- SMILES: O=C/1c4c(O\C2=C\1c3c(C2=O)cccc3)cccc4

Properties
Chemical formula	C_{16}H_{8}O_{3}
Molar mass	248.237 g·mol^{−1}
- Except where otherwise noted, data are given for materials in their standard state (at 25 °C [77 °F], 100 kPa). Infobox references

Wrightiadione is an isoflavone that occurs in the plant Wrightia tomentosa and can also be synthesized. It is a novel template for the TrkA kinase inhibitors.
