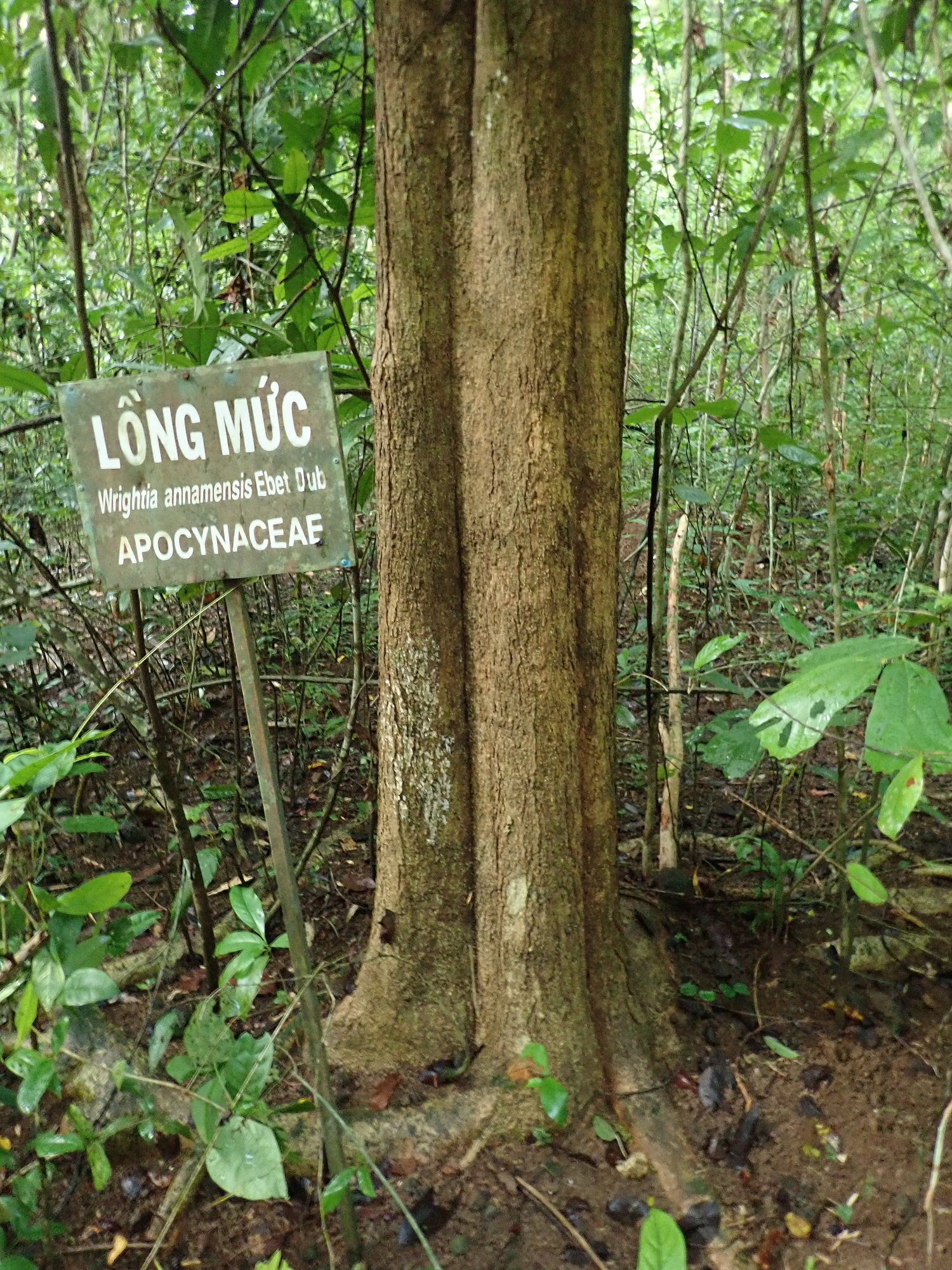
- labelled trunk base: in Cat Tien National Park

Scientific classification
- Kingdom: Plantae
- Clade: Tracheophytes
- Clade: Angiosperms
- Clade: Eudicots
- Clade: Asterids
- Order: Gentianales
- Family: Apocynaceae
- Genus: Wrightia
- Species: W. annamensis

Binomial name
- Wrightia annamensis Eberhardt & Dubard, 1913

Synonyms
- Wrightia annamensis var. coronata Pit.

= Wrightia annamensis =

Species of tree

Wrightia annamensis is a small tree species in the family Apocynaceae. Its distribution includes: southern China, Cambodia and Viet Nam: where it may be called: lòng mức trung bộ.

At the time of writing (July 2018) there is a database conflict, with some authorities placing this species as a heterotypic synonym of Wrightia pubescens subsp. lanitii (Blanco).
