= Pleioceras orientale =

Conservation status
- Endangered (IUCN 3.1)

Scientific classification
- Kingdom: Plantae
- Clade: Tracheophytes
- Clade: Angiosperms
- Clade: Eudicots
- Clade: Asterids
- Order: Gentianales
- Family: Apocynaceae
- Genus: Pleioceras
- Species: P. orientale

Binomial name
- Pleioceras orientale Vollesen

Species of flowering plant

Pleioceras orientale is a species of plant in the family Apocynaceae. It is native to Kenya and Tanzania. The species is assessed as endangered on the IUCN Red List due to its being cleared to make way for agriculture.
