= Wrightia laevis =

Conservation status
- Least Concern (IUCN 3.1)

Scientific classification
- Kingdom: Plantae
- Clade: Tracheophytes
- Clade: Angiosperms
- Clade: Eudicots
- Clade: Asterids
- Order: Gentianales
- Family: Apocynaceae
- Genus: Wrightia
- Species: W. laevis

Binomial name
- Wrightia laevis Hook.f.

Species of plant

Wrightia laevis is a species of plant in the family Apocynaceae. It is found in Queensland (Australia), Cambodia, China, Indonesia, Laos, Malaysia, Burma, Papua New Guinea, the Philippines, Singapore, Thailand, and Vietnam.
