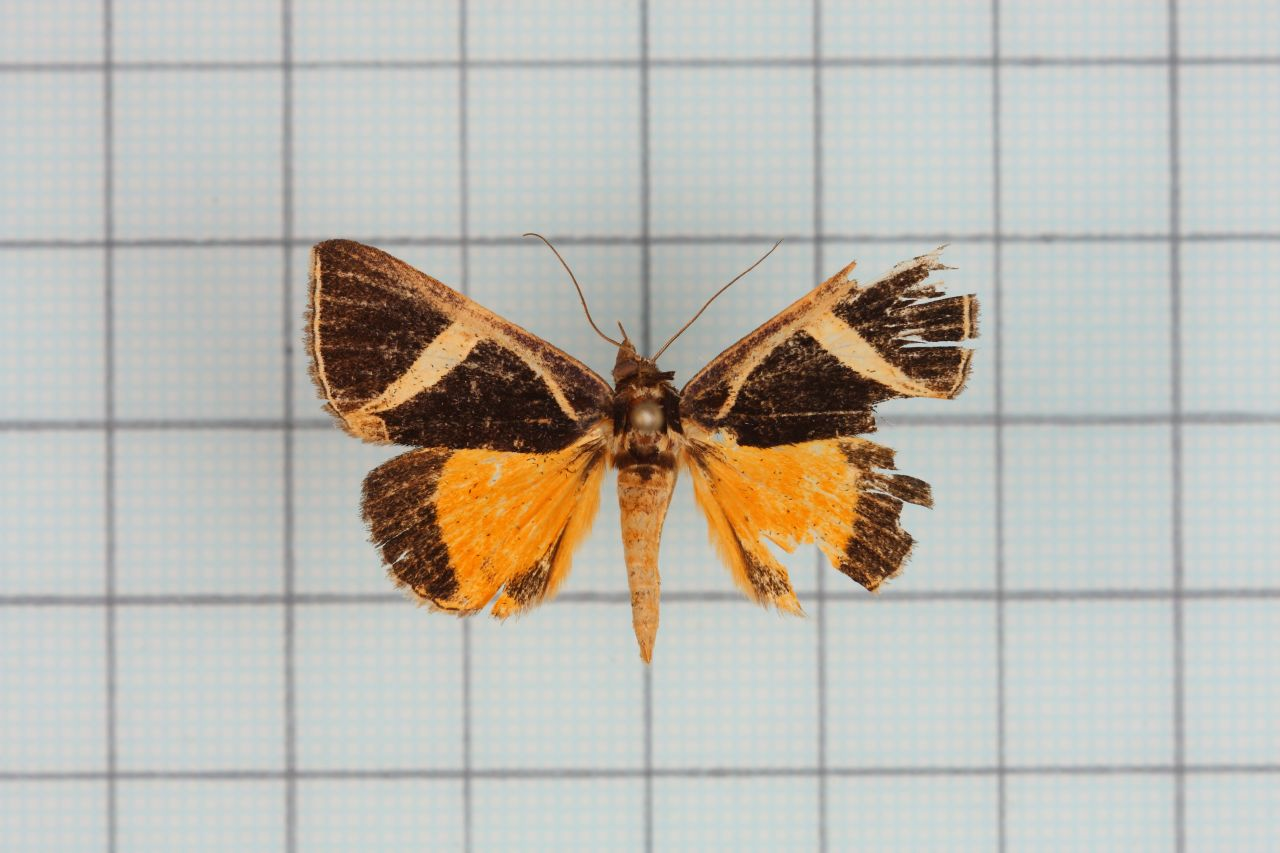

Scientific classification
- Domain: Eukaryota
- Kingdom: Animalia
- Phylum: Arthropoda
- Class: Insecta
- Order: Lepidoptera
- Superfamily: Noctuoidea
- Family: Erebidae
- Genus: Fodina
- Species: F. contigua

Binomial name
- Fodina contigua Wileman, 1914

Synonyms
- Fodina formosensis Strand, 1914; Fodina kosemponis Strand, 1919

= Fodina contigua =

Species of moth

Fodina contigua is a moth in the family Erebidae first described by Wileman in 1914. It is found in Taiwan.

The wingspan is 38–41 mm.
