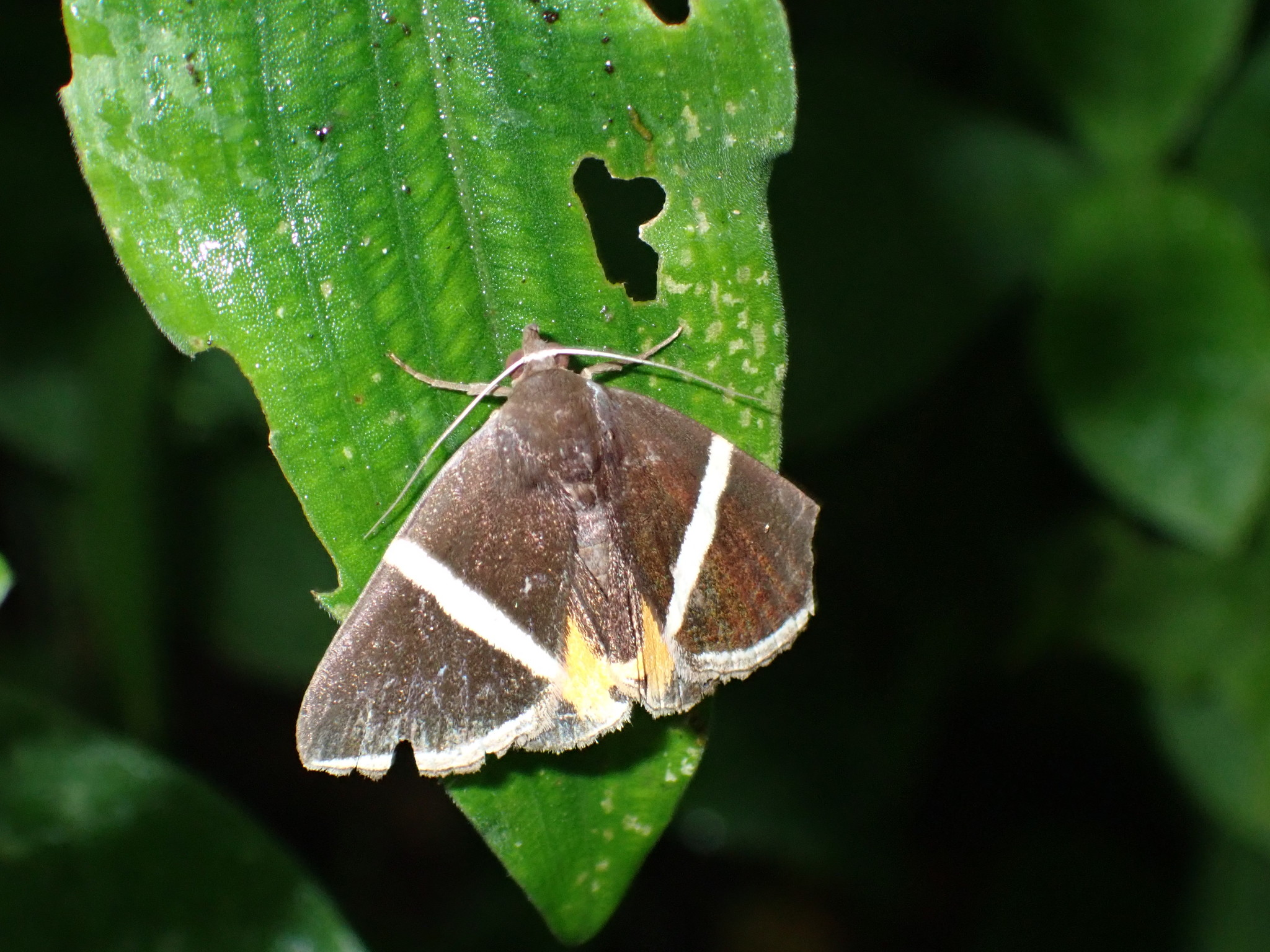

Scientific classification
- Kingdom: Animalia
- Phylum: Arthropoda
- Clade: Pancrustacea
- Class: Insecta
- Order: Lepidoptera
- Superfamily: Noctuoidea
- Family: Erebidae
- Genus: Fodina
- Species: F. pallula

Binomial name
- Fodina pallula Guenée, 1852

= Fodina pallula =

Species of moth

Fodina pallula is a moth of the family Noctuidae first described by Achille Guenée in 1852. It is found in India and Sri Lanka.
