= Wrightia lanceolata =

Conservation status
- Vulnerable (IUCN 2.3)

Scientific classification
- Kingdom: Plantae
- Clade: Tracheophytes
- Clade: Angiosperms
- Clade: Eudicots
- Clade: Asterids
- Order: Gentianales
- Family: Apocynaceae
- Genus: Wrightia
- Species: W. lanceolata

Binomial name
- Wrightia lanceolata Kerr.

Species of plant

Wrightia lanceolata is a species of plant in the family Apocynaceae. It is endemic to Thailand.
