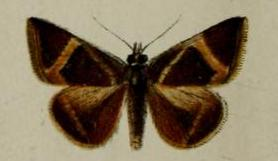

Scientific classification
- Domain: Eukaryota
- Kingdom: Animalia
- Phylum: Arthropoda
- Class: Insecta
- Order: Lepidoptera
- Superfamily: Noctuoidea
- Family: Erebidae
- Genus: Fodina
- Species: F. johnstoni

Binomial name
- Fodina johnstoni Butler, 1896

= Fodina johnstoni =

Species of moth

Fodina johnstoni is a moth in the family Erebidae first described by Arthur Gardiner Butler in 1896. It is found in Malawi.
