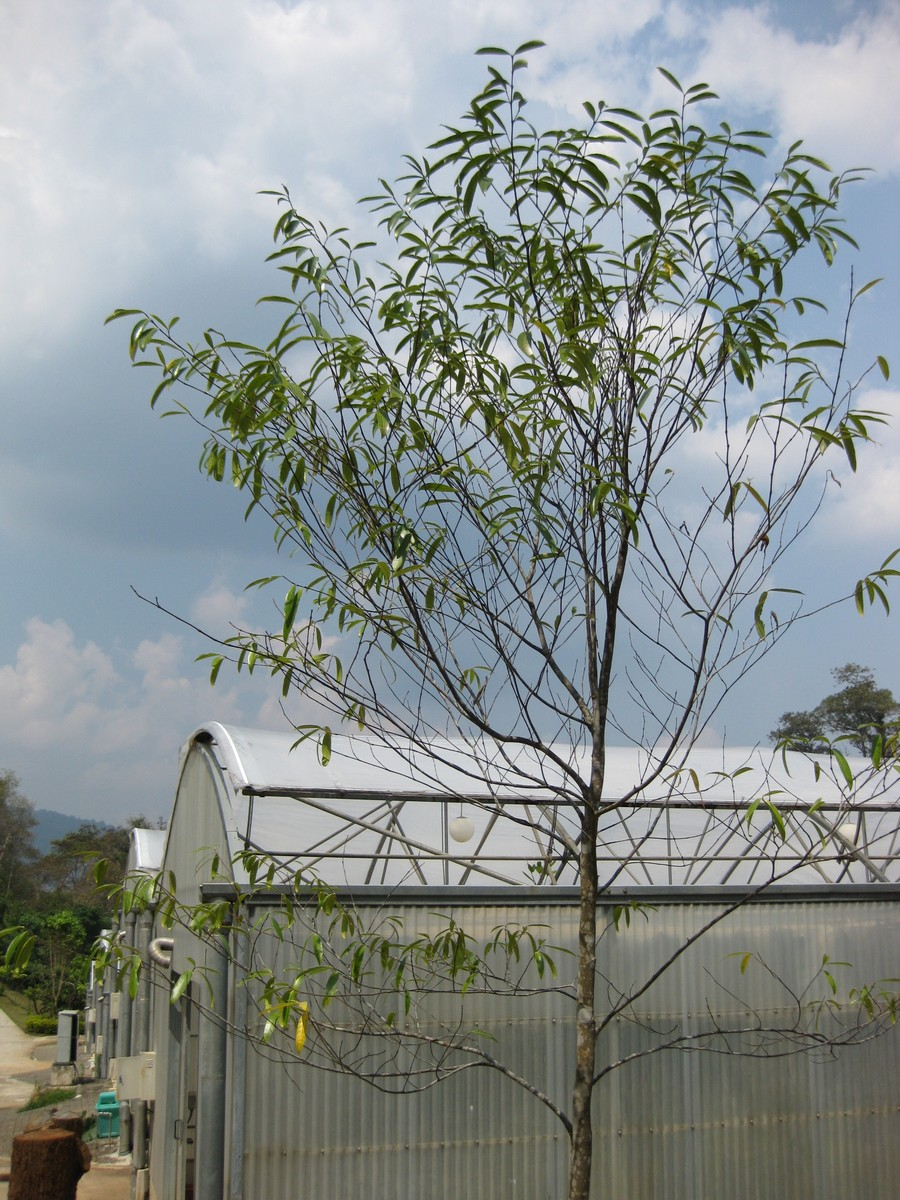

Scientific classification
- Kingdom: Plantae
- Clade: Tracheophytes
- Clade: Angiosperms
- Clade: Eudicots
- Clade: Asterids
- Order: Gentianales
- Family: Apocynaceae
- Subfamily: Apocynoideae
- Tribe: Wrightieae
- Genus: Wrightia
- Species: W. dubia

Binomial name
- Wrightia dubia (Sims) Spreng.

Synonyms
- Cameraria dubia Sims; Scleranthera cambodiensis (Pierre ex Pit.) Pichon; Scleranthera dubia (Sims) Pichon; Strophanthus jackianus Wall. ex G.Don; Wrightia cambodiensis Pierre ex Pit.; Wrightia cambodiensis Pierre; Wrightia dubia var. membranifolia King & Gamble; Wrightia kontumensis Lý; Wrightia rubriflora Pit.

= Wrightia dubia =

Species of shrub

Wrightia dubia is a species of shrub-plant in the family Apocynaceae. Its distribution includes: Indo-China and peninsular Malaysia (Kedah, Penang, Pahan). There are no subspecies are listed in the Catalogue of Life. In Viet Nam, it may be called lòng mức ngờ, and in Malaysia it may be called bunga hantu ("ghost flower").
