= Wrightia angustifolia =

Scientific classification
- Kingdom: Plantae
- Clade: Embryophytes
- Clade: Tracheophytes
- Clade: Angiosperms
- Clade: Eudicots
- Clade: Asterids
- Order: Gentianales
- Family: Apocynaceae
- Genus: Wrightia
- Species: W. angustifolia

Binomial name
- Wrightia angustifolia Thwaites.

Species of plant

Wrightia angustifolia is a species of plant in the family Apocynaceae. It is endemic to Sri Lanka. Found in Shrubland.
