= Fodina viettei =

Scientific classification
- Domain: Eukaryota
- Kingdom: Animalia
- Phylum: Arthropoda
- Class: Insecta
- Order: Lepidoptera
- Superfamily: Noctuoidea
- Family: Erebidae
- Genus: Fodina
- Species: F. viettei

Binomial name
- Fodina viettei Berio, 1959

Species of moth

Fodina viettei is a moth in the family Erebidae. It is found in north-western Madagascar.

The female of this species has a wingspan of 31 mm. The holotype was found in Ankarafantsika
