= Fodina afflicta =

Scientific classification
- Domain: Eukaryota
- Kingdom: Animalia
- Phylum: Arthropoda
- Class: Insecta
- Order: Lepidoptera
- Superfamily: Noctuoidea
- Family: Erebidae
- Genus: Fodina
- Species: F. afflicta

Binomial name
- Fodina afflicta Berio, 1959

Species of moth

Fodina afflicta is a moth in the family Noctuidae. It is found in Madagascar.

The male of this species has a wingspan of 30 mm. The holotype was found in the Ankaratra massif in an altitude of 1850 m.
