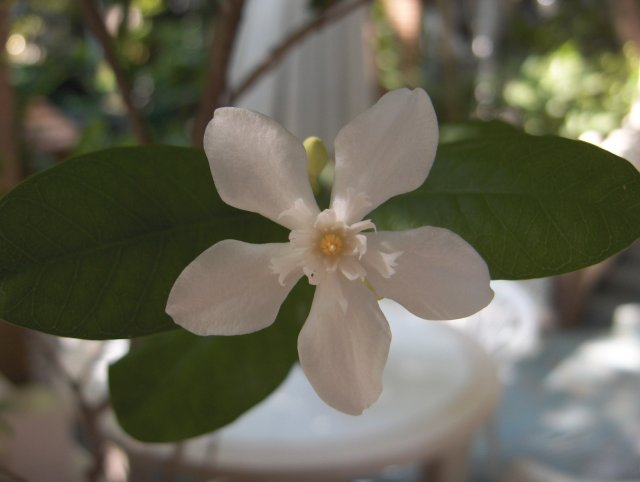
- Wrightia antidysenterica

Scientific classification
- Kingdom: Plantae
- Clade: Tracheophytes
- Clade: Angiosperms
- Clade: Eudicots
- Clade: Asterids
- Order: Gentianales
- Family: Apocynaceae
- Subfamily: Apocynoideae
- Tribe: Wrightieae
- Genus: Wrightia; R.Br.

Synonyms
- Balfouria R.Br.; Piaggiaea Chiov.; Scleranthera Pichon; Walidda (A.DC.) Pichon

= Wrightia =

Genus of flowering plants

Wrightia is a genus of flowering plants in the family Apocynaceae, first described as a genus in 1810. It native to tropical Africa, China, the Indian subcontinent, Southeast Asia, Papuasia, and Australia. The species are all small trees or shrubs.

The genus was named for William Wright (1735–1819), Scottish physician and botanist, by Robert Brown.

Wrightia antidysenterica has long been known in Indian Ayurvedic tradition, and is called "kuţaja" in Sanskrit.

== Species ==
Plants of the World Online includes:

1. Wrightia angustifolia Thwaites – Sri Lanka
2. Wrightia annamensis Eberh. & Dubard – S China, Cambodia, Vietnam
3. Wrightia antidysenterica (L.) R.Br. – Sri Lanka
4. Wrightia arborea (Dennst.) Mabb. – S China, India, Sri Lanka, Himalayas, Indochina
5. Wrightia calcicola D.J.Middleton – Thailand
6. Wrightia candollei S.Vidal – Philippines
7. Wrightia coccinea (Roxb. ex Hornem.) Sims – S China, Himalayas, Indochina
8. Wrightia collettii Ngan – Myanmar
9. Wrightia demartiniana Chiov. – Western Australia
10. Wrightia dolichocarpa Bahadur & Bennet – Ethiopia, Somalia, Kenya
11. Wrightia dubia (Sims) Spreng. – W India
12. Wrightia flavidorosea Trimen – Indochina, W Malaysia
13. Wrightia hanleyi Elmer – Sri Lanka but extinct
14. Wrightia indica Ngan – Palawan
15. Wrightia karaketii D.J.Middleton – S India
16. Wrightia kwangtungensis Tsiang – Thailand
17. Wrightia laevis Hook.f. – S China, SE Asia, Papuasia, Queensland
18. Wrightia lanceolata Kerr – S Thailand
19. Wrightia lecomtei Pit. – Cambodia, Vietnam
20. Wrightia natalensis Stapf -southern Africa
21. Wrightia novobritannica (Ngan) D.J.Middleton – New Britain
22. Wrightia palawanensis D.J.Middleton – Palawan
23. Wrightia poomae D.J.Middleton – Thailand
24. Wrightia puberula (Thwaites) Ngan – Sri Lanka but extinct
25. Wrightia pubescens R.Br. – S China, SE Asia, Papuasia, N Australia
26. Wrightia religiosa (Teijsm. & Binn.) Benth. ex Kurz – Guangdong, Indochina, W Malaysia
27. Wrightia saligna (R.Br.) F.Muell. ex Benth. – N Australia
28. Wrightia siamensis D.J.Middleton – Thailand
29. Wrightia sikkimensis Gamble – S China, E Himalayas, Vietnam
30. Wrightia sirikitiae D.J.Middleton & Santisuk – Thailand
31. Wrightia tinctoria (Roxb.) R.Br. – India, Nepal, Myanmar, Vietnam, Timor and Australia
32. Wrightia tokiae D.J.Middleton – Thailand
33. Wrightia vietnamensis Hazell & D.J.Middleton – Vietnam
34. Wrightia viridiflora Kerr – Thailand

formerly included

1. Wrightia afzelii, syn of Pleioceras afzelii
2. Wrightia bacelliana, syn of Melodinus acutiflorus
3. Wrightia parviflora, syn of Pleioceras barteri
4. Wrightia piscidia, syn of Melodinus cochinchinensis
5. Wrightia stuhlmannii, syn of Alafia lucida
