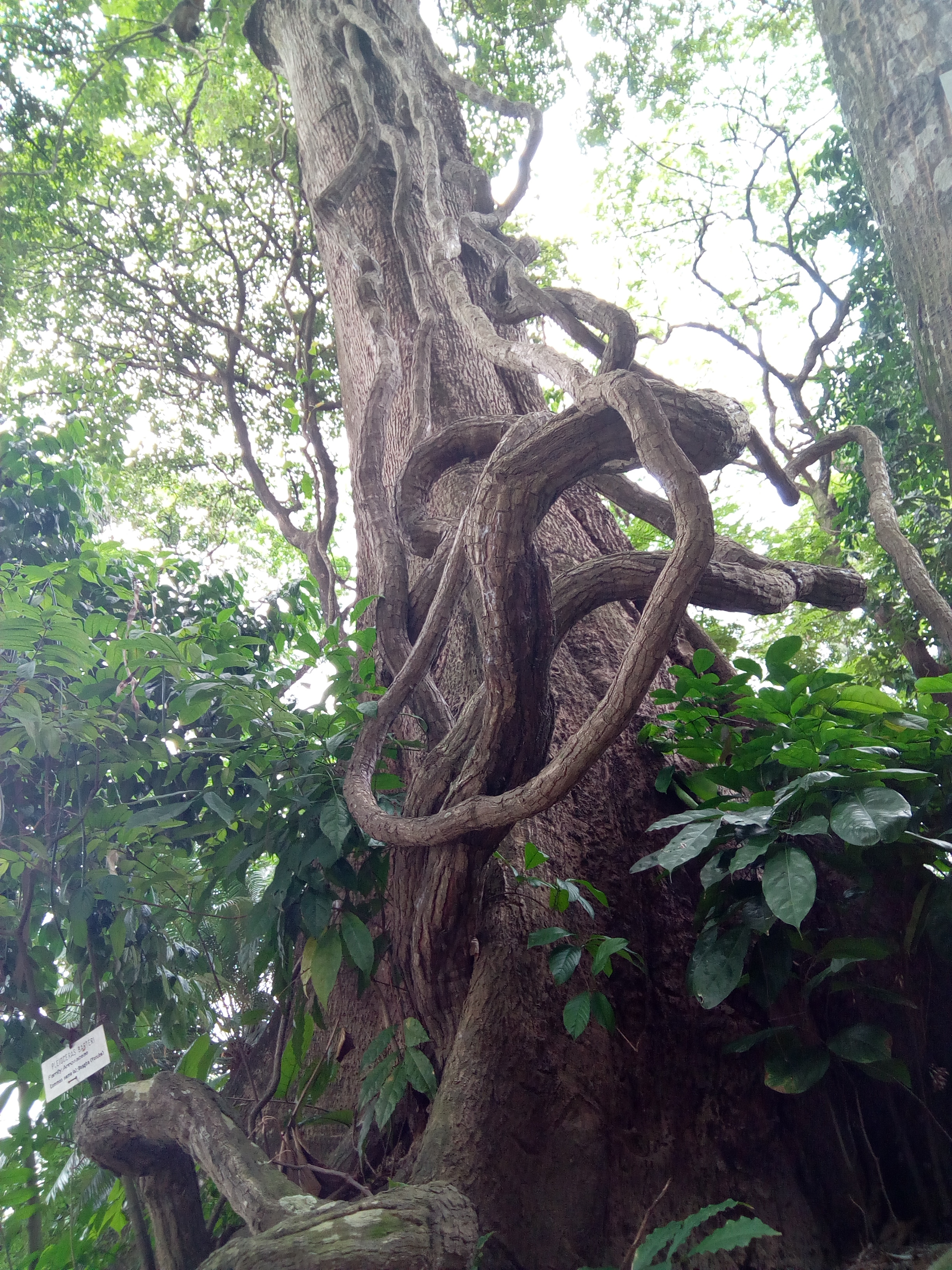
- Pleioceras barteri

Scientific classification
- Kingdom: Plantae
- Clade: Tracheophytes
- Clade: Angiosperms
- Clade: Eudicots
- Clade: Asterids
- Order: Gentianales
- Family: Apocynaceae
- Subfamily: Apocynoideae
- Tribe: Wrightieae
- Genus: Pleioceras; Baill.

= Pleioceras =

Genus of flowering plants

Pleioceras is a genus of plants in the family Apocynaceae, first described as a genus in 1888. It is native to tropical Africa.

Species

- Pleioceras afzelii (K.Schum.) Stapf - Guinea, Sierra Leone, Liberia
- Pleioceras barteri Baill. - Sierra Leone, Liberia, Ghana, Ivory Coast, Nigeria, Benin, Cameroon
- Pleioceras gilletii Stapf - Nigeria, Republic of Congo, Zaire, Angola
- Pleioceras orientale Vollesen - Kenya, Tanzania, Mozambique
- Pleioceras zenkeri Stapf - Nigeria, Gabon, Cameroon
