= Holarrhena mitis =

Scientific classification
- Kingdom: Plantae
- Clade: Tracheophytes
- Clade: Angiosperms
- Clade: Eudicots
- Clade: Asterids
- Order: Gentianales
- Family: Apocynaceae
- Genus: Holarrhena
- Species: H. mitis

Binomial name
- Holarrhena mitis (Vahl) R.Br. ex Roem. & Schult.

Synonyms
- Carissa mitis Vahl

Species of plant

Holarrhena mitis is a small, fragrant-flowered tree in the family Apocynaceae. It is found in Sri Lanka at elevations below 1,500 feet (460 m). It has smooth, white bark and soft, fine-grained, yellow-white wood. The wood and bark have been used to treat fevers and dysentery. Common names include kiri-mawara or kiri-walla in Sinhala and kuluppalai in Tamil.
