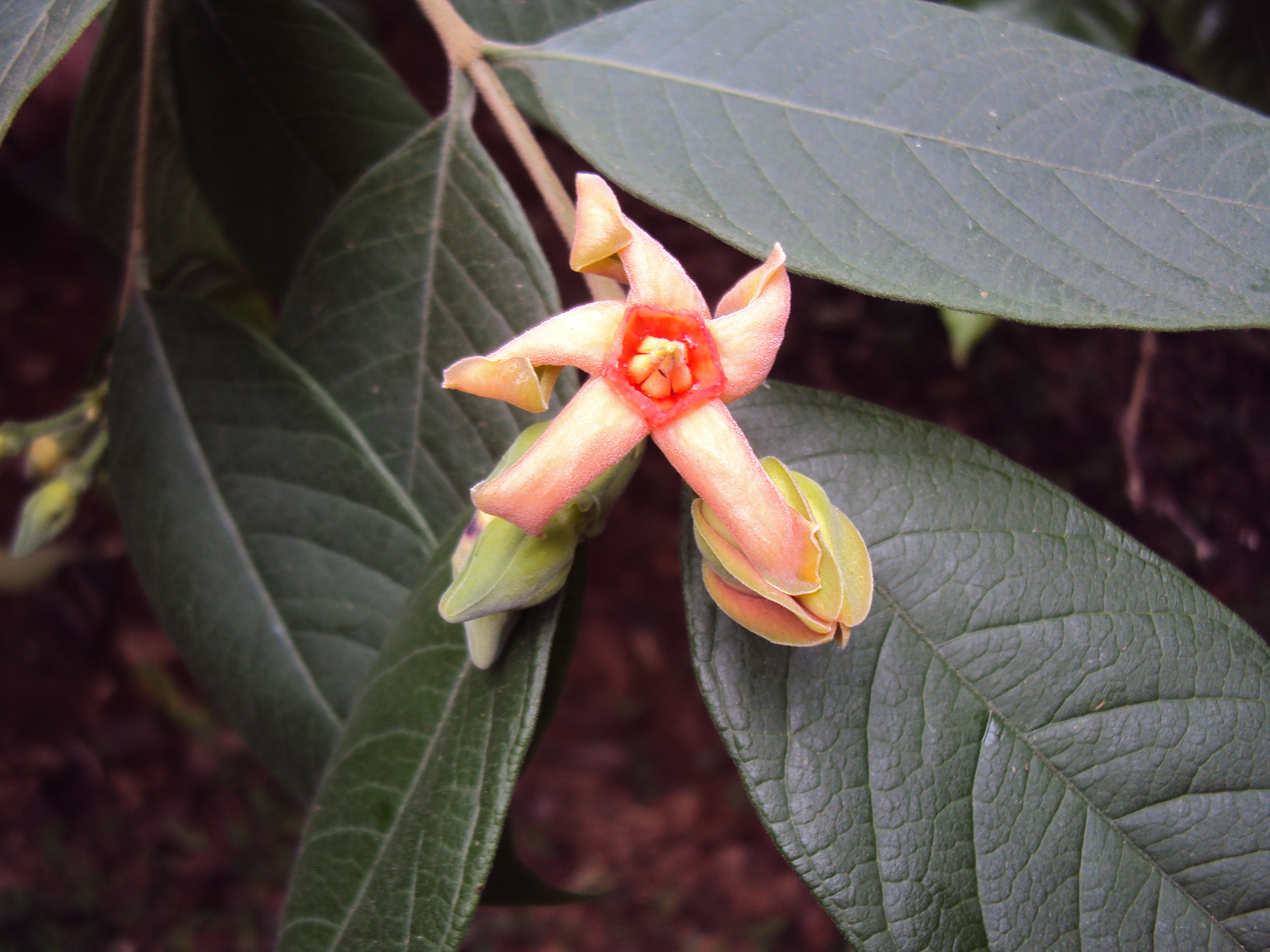

Conservation status
- Least Concern (IUCN 3.1)

Scientific classification
- Kingdom: Plantae
- Clade: Tracheophytes
- Clade: Angiosperms
- Clade: Eudicots
- Clade: Asterids
- Order: Gentianales
- Family: Apocynaceae
- Genus: Wrightia
- Species: W. arborea

Binomial name
- Wrightia arborea (Dennst.) Mabb.

Synonyms
- List: Beaumontia wallichii (A.DC.) Walp.; Chonemorpha vestita G.Don; Echites tomentosus B.Heyne ex Roth; Echites vestitus Roem. & Schult.; Hunteria eugeniifolia Wall. ex G.Don; Nerium coraea Buch.-Ham. ex A.DC.; Nerium tomentosum Roxb.; Periploca arborea Dennst.; Wrightia coalita Buch.-Ham. ex Dillwyn; Wrightia coraia Wall. ex A.DC.; Wrightia hamiltoniana Wall.; Wrightia mollissima Wall.; Wrightia pubescens Roth; Wrightia rheedei Kostel.; Wrightia tomentosa Roem. & Schult.; Wrightia tomentosa subsp. pauciflora Ngan; Wrightia wallichii A.DC.

= Wrightia arborea =

Species of flowering plant

Wrightia arborea, the woolly dyeing rosebay, is a species of flowering plant in the family Apocynaceae. It is native to the Indian Subcontinent, Southeast Asia, and southern China. A tree reaching 20 m (66 ft), local peoples use it for timber and as the source of a dye.
