= Wrightia demartiniana =

Conservation status
- Near Threatened (IUCN 3.1)

Scientific classification
- Kingdom: Plantae
- Clade: Embryophytes
- Clade: Tracheophytes
- Clade: Spermatophytes
- Clade: Angiosperms
- Clade: Eudicots
- Clade: Asterids
- Order: Gentianales
- Family: Apocynaceae
- Genus: Wrightia
- Species: W. demartiniana

Binomial name
- Wrightia demartiniana Chiov.

Synonyms
- Piaggiaea boranensis Chiov.; Piaggiaea demartiniana (Chiov.) Chiov.; Wrightia boranensis (Chiov.) Cufod.

Species of plant

Wrightia demartiniana is a plant in the dogbane family Apocynaceae. It is native to East Africa.

== Description ==
Wrightia demartiniana grows as a shrub or small tree up to 5 metres (16 ft) tall. Its fragrant flowers feature a white or creamy corolla. The fruit is grey-green with paired follicles, up to 30 centimetres (12 in) in diameter. Local traditional medicinal uses include the treatment of kidney problems, gonorrhoea and as a laxative.

== Distribution and habitat ==
Wrightia demartiniana is native to Ethiopia, Somalia and Kenya. Its habitat is bushland from 100–1,000 metres (300–3,300 ft) altitude.

== Conservation ==
Wrightia demartiniana has been assessed as near threatened on the IUCN Red List. Its habitat is threatened by livestock farming and by harvesting of its wood. However the species is present in two protected areas in Kenya: Kora National Park and Samburu National Park.
