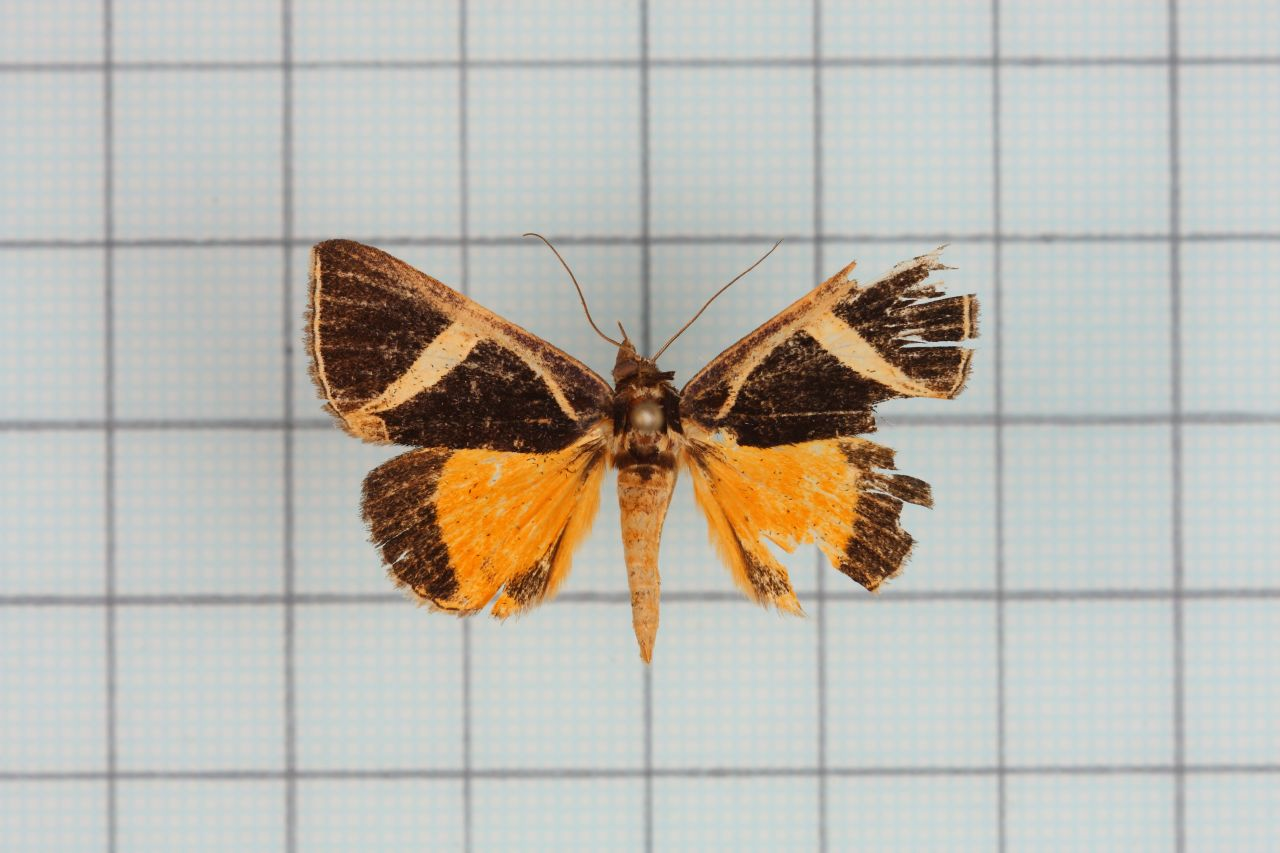
- Fodina contigua

Scientific classification
- Kingdom: Animalia
- Phylum: Arthropoda
- Clade: Pancrustacea
- Class: Insecta
- Order: Lepidoptera
- Superfamily: Noctuoidea
- Family: Erebidae
- Subfamily: Calpinae
- Genus: Fodina; Guenée in Boisduval & Guenée, 1852

Synonyms
- Anocala Scott, 1891

= Fodina =

Genus of moths

Fodina is a genus of noctuoid moths in the family Erebidae erected by Achille Guenée in 1852.

== Description ==
Palpi upturned, with second joint reaching vertex of head, and long third joint. Thorax and abdomen smoothly scaled. Tibia spineless, and not hairy in males. Forewings with quadrate apex.

== Species ==
- Fodina afflicta Berio, 1959
- Fodina albicincta Walker, 1869
- Fodina analamerana Viette, 1966
- Fodina antemedia Strand 1919
- Fodina antsianaka Viette, 1966
- Fodina arctioides Walker, 1865
- Fodina auximena Viette, 1958
- Fodina chrysomera Lower, 1903
- Fodina contigua Wileman, 1914
- Fodina cuneigera Butler, 1889
- Fodina decussis Saalmüller, 1891
- Fodina embolophora Hampson, 1902
- Fodina flacourti Viette, 1982
- Fodina fontalis Gaede, 1939
- Fodina fusca Wileman, 1914
- Fodina gloriosa Lucas, 1892
- Fodina hayesi Viette, 1981
- Fodina hoppei Hacker & Saldaitis, 2011
- Fodina hypercompoides Walker, 1865
- Fodina insignis Butler, 1880
- Fodina intermedia Strand 1921
- Fodina johnstoni Butler, 1897
- Fodina kebea Bethune-Baker, 1906
- Fodina lanaoensis Schultz, 1907
- Fodina laurentensis Viette, 1966
- Fodina legrainei Hacker & Saldaitis, 2010
- Fodina mabillei Viette, 1966
- Fodina madagascariensis Viette, 1966
- Fodina malagasy Viette, 1966
- Fodina maltzanae Strand, 1914
- Fodina matacassi Viette, 1982
- Fodina maudavei Viette, 1982
- Fodina megalesia Viette, 1966
- Fodina oriolus Guenée, 1852
- Fodina ostorius Donovan, 1805
- Fodina oxyprora Bethune-Baker, 1911
- Fodina pallula Guenée, 1852
- Fodina pauliani Viette, 1966
- Fodina pergrata Turner, 1933
- Fodina postmaculata Hampson, 1893
- Fodina quadricolor Strand, 1914
- Fodina reussiana Strand, 1914
- Fodina rhodotaenia Mabille, 1879
- Fodina sakalava Viette, 1966
- Fodina sogai Viette, 1966
- Fodina stola Guenée, 1852
- Fodina sumatrensis Prout, 1924
- Fodina toulgoeti Viette, 1979
- Fodina viettei Berio, 1959
- Fodina vieui Viette, 1966
