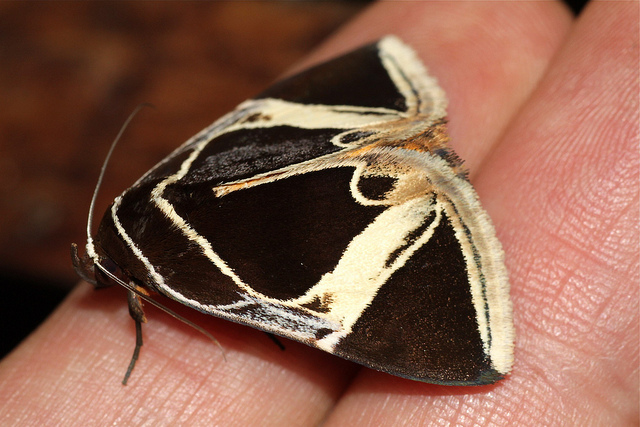
- Borneo, Trusmadi hill dipterocarp forest

Scientific classification
- Kingdom: Animalia
- Phylum: Arthropoda
- Clade: Pancrustacea
- Class: Insecta
- Order: Lepidoptera
- Superfamily: Noctuoidea
- Family: Erebidae
- Genus: Fodina
- Species: F. sumatrensis

Binomial name
- Fodina sumatrensis Prout, 1924

= Fodina sumatrensis =

Species of moth

Fodina sumatrensis is a noctuoid moth in the family Erebidae, subfamily Erebinae (formerly Noctuidae; Catocalinae). It is found in Peninsular Malaysia, Sumatra, and Borneo mostly in lowlands.
