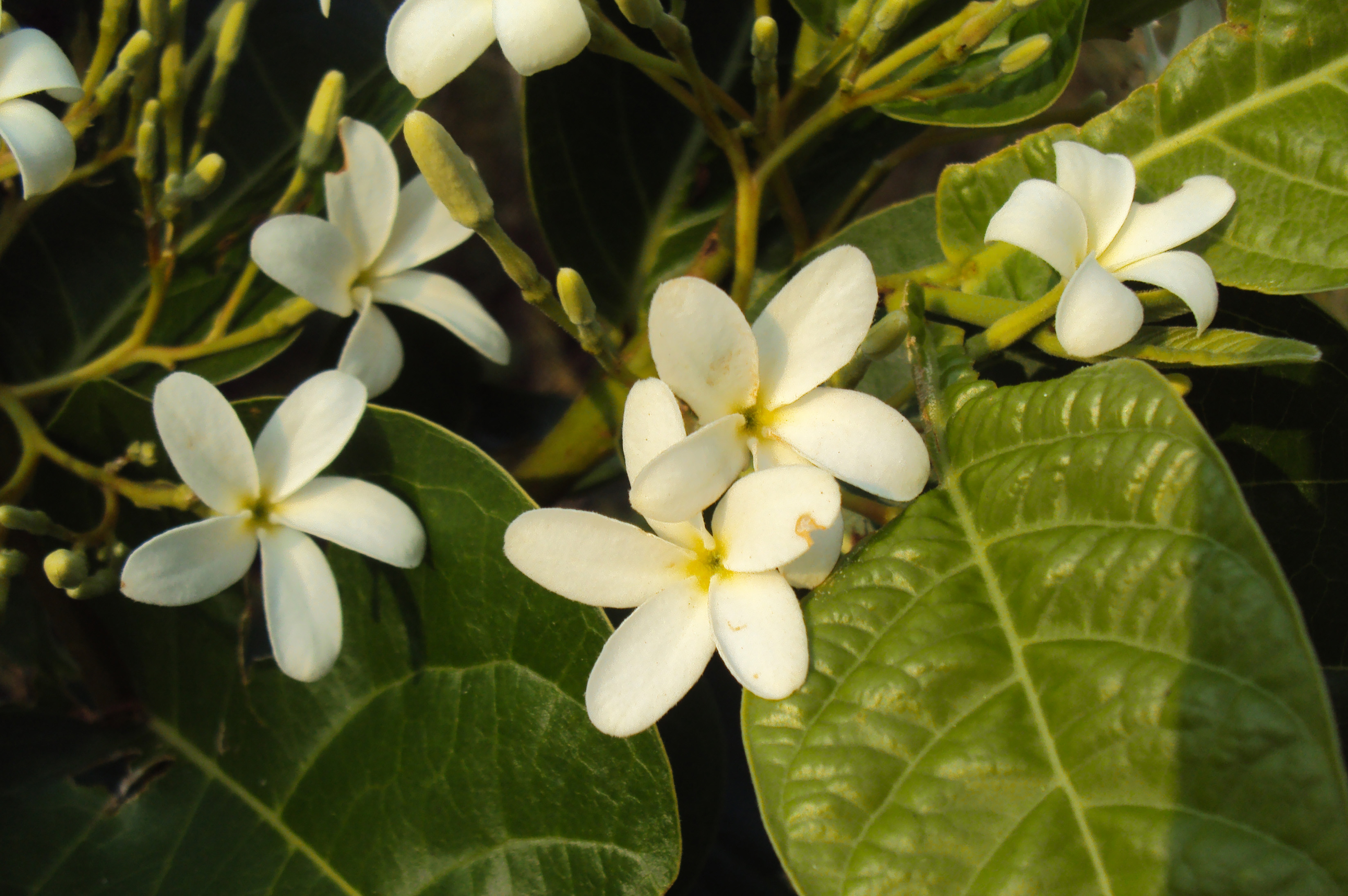
- Holarrhena pubescens

Scientific classification
- Kingdom: Plantae
- Clade: Embryophytes
- Clade: Tracheophytes
- Clade: Spermatophytes
- Clade: Angiosperms
- Clade: Eudicots
- Clade: Asterids
- Order: Gentianales
- Family: Apocynaceae
- Subfamily: Apocynoideae
- Tribe: Malouetieae
- Genus: Holarrhena; R.Br.

Synonyms
- Physetobasis Hassk.

= Holarrhena =

Genus of plants

Holarrhena is a genus of plant in the family Apocynaceae first described as a genus in 1810. It is native to tropical and southern Africa as well as south, east, and southeast Asia. As of July 2026, Plants of the World Online accepted these species:

- Holarrhena congolensis Stapf – Democratic Republic of the Congo
- Holarrhena curtisii King & Gamble – Indochina
- Holarrhena floribunda (G.Don) T.Durand & Schinz – Western and Central Africa
- Holarrhena mitis (Vahl) R.Br. ex Roem. & Schult. – Sri Lanka
- Holarrhena parishadii V.Suresh, Sojan & Ambika – India
- Holarrhena pubescens Wall. ex G.Don – Eastern, Southern and Central Africa; Indian subcontinent, Indochina, China

In 2024, a new species of Holarrhena from the Palakkad Gap of the Western Ghats, Holarrhena parishadii, was described.
