= Wrightia lecomtei =

Conservation status
- Vulnerable (IUCN 2.3)

Scientific classification
- Kingdom: Plantae
- Clade: Tracheophytes
- Clade: Angiosperms
- Clade: Eudicots
- Clade: Asterids
- Order: Gentianales
- Family: Apocynaceae
- Genus: Wrightia
- Species: W. lecomtei

Binomial name
- Wrightia lecomtei Pitard

Species of plant

Wrightia lecomtei is a species of plant in the family Apocynaceae. It is found in Cambodia and Thailand in dry and evergreen forests. It is a shrub to small tree and can grow up to 5 m tall. Most plant parts are puberulent. Leaves are arranged oppositely along the stem; each leaf is 3 - 8 cm long by 2- 3.5 cm wide, oval to ovate shaped.
