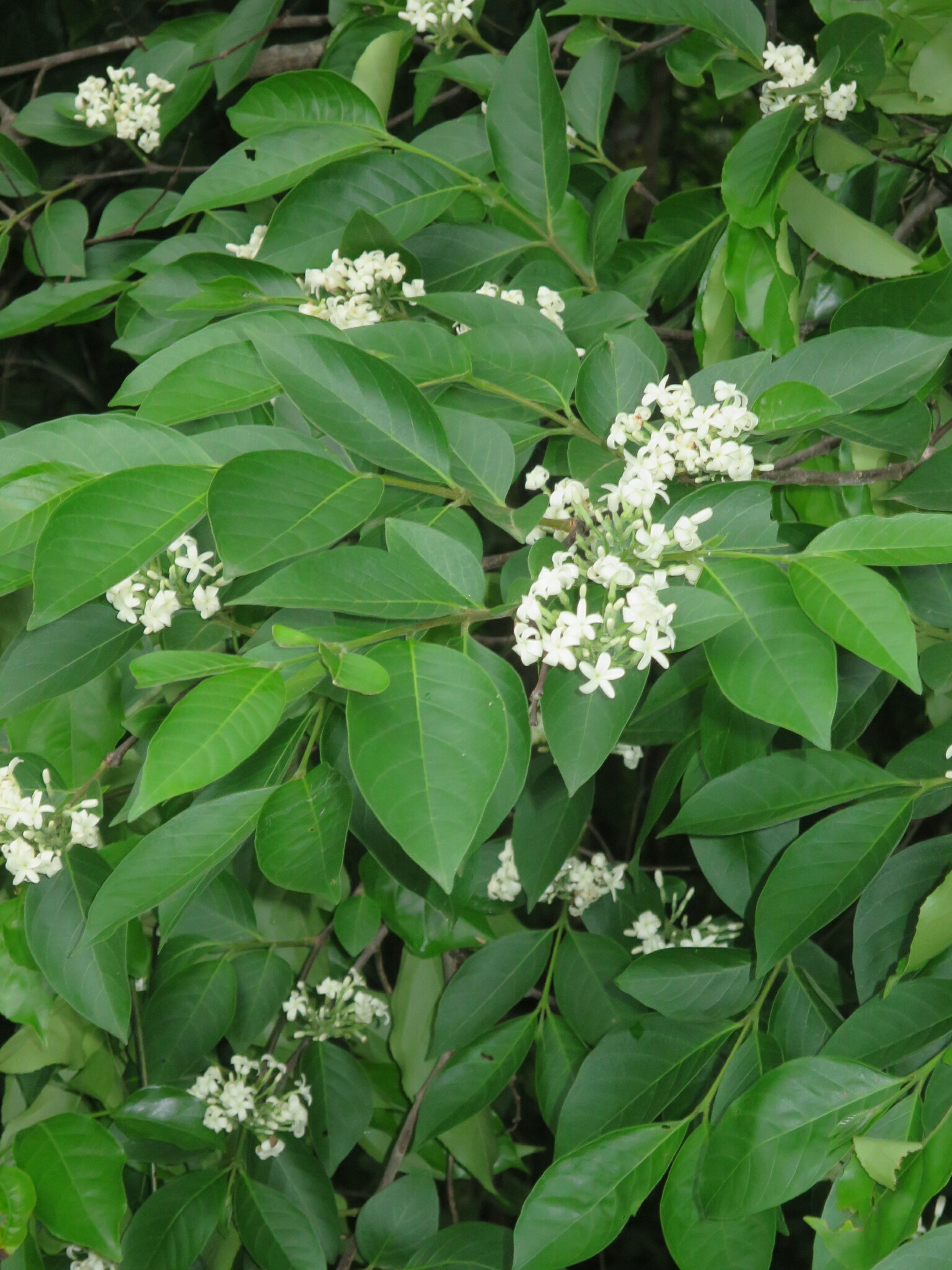
- In Guinea-Bissau

Conservation status
- Least Concern (IUCN 3.1)

Scientific classification
- Kingdom: Plantae
- Clade: Embryophytes
- Clade: Tracheophytes
- Clade: Spermatophytes
- Clade: Angiosperms
- Clade: Eudicots
- Clade: Asterids
- Order: Gentianales
- Family: Apocynaceae
- Genus: Holarrhena
- Species: H. floribunda

Binomial name
- Holarrhena floribunda (G.Don) T.Durand & Schinz

Synonyms
- Holarrhena africana A.DC.; Holarrhena ovata A.DC.; Holarrhena wulfsbergii Stapf; Rondeletia floribunda G.Don

= Holarrhena floribunda =

Species of plant

Holarrhena floribunda, commonly known as the false rubber tree, conessi bark or kurchi bark, is a plant in the family Apocynaceae.

== Description ==
Holarrhena floribunda grows as a shrub or tree up to 25 m (80 ft) tall, with a stem diameter of up to 30 cm (12 in). Its fragrant flowers feature a white corolla. The fruit is pale grey to dark brown with paired follicles, each up to 60 cm (24 in) long.

== Taxonomy ==
Holarrhena floribunda was first described in 1834 as Rondeletia floribunda by Scottish botanist George Don in A General History of the Dichlamydeous Plants. In 1896, botanists Théophile Alexis Durand and Hans Schinz transferred the species to Holarrhena. The specific epithet floribunda means 'profusely flowered'.

== Distribution and habitat ==
Holarrhena floribunda is found in a variety of habitats from sea level to 1,000 m (3,300 ft) altitude. The plant is native to a wide range of West and Central Africa from Senegal to Angola.

== Conservation ==
Holarrhena floribunda has been assessed as least concern on the IUCN Red List. Its population is stable, with a broad distribution and no currently identified threats.

== Uses ==
Holarrhena floribunda is locally used in traditional medicine as a treatment for dysentery, diarrhoea, fever, snakebite, infertility, venereal disease, diabetes and malaria. The plant has been used as arrow poison.
