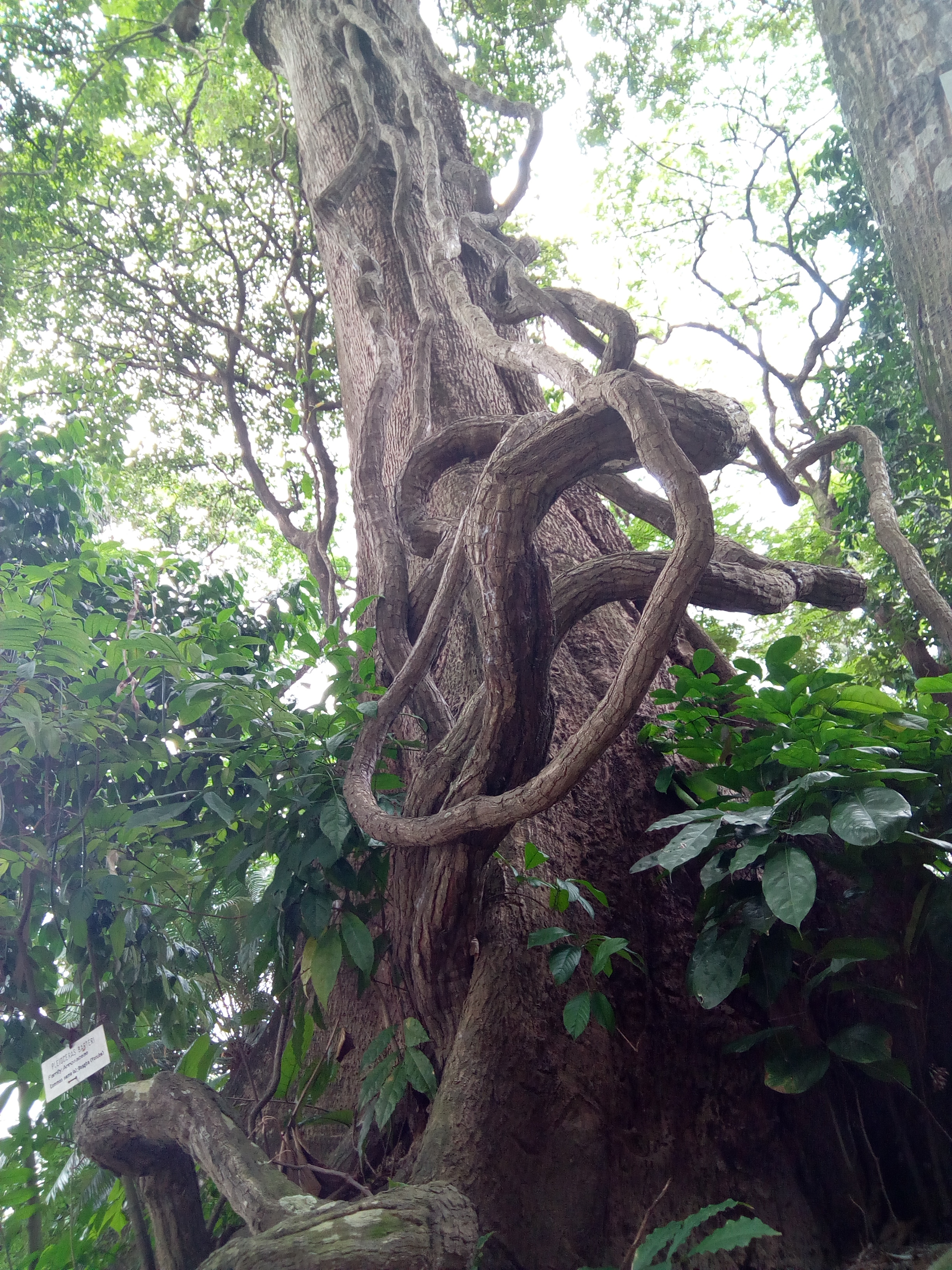

Scientific classification
- Kingdom: Plantae
- Clade: Tracheophytes
- Clade: Angiosperms
- Clade: Eudicots
- Clade: Asterids
- Order: Gentianales
- Family: Apocynaceae
- Genus: Pleioceras
- Species: P. barteri

Binomial name
- Pleioceras barteri Baill.

Synonyms
- Wrightia parviflora Stapf

= Pleioceras barteri =

Species of shrub

Pleioceras barteri grows as a shrub, liana or small tree up to 4 metres (13 ft) tall. Its flowers feature dark red or violet corolla lobes with yellow apex. Its habitat is forests, bush or open ground in coastal areas from sea level to 500 metres (1,600 ft) altitude. Local traditional medicinal uses include as an emmenagogue, abortifacient and also in the treatment of rheumatism and malaria. Pleioceras barteri is native to tropical West Africa and Cameroon.
