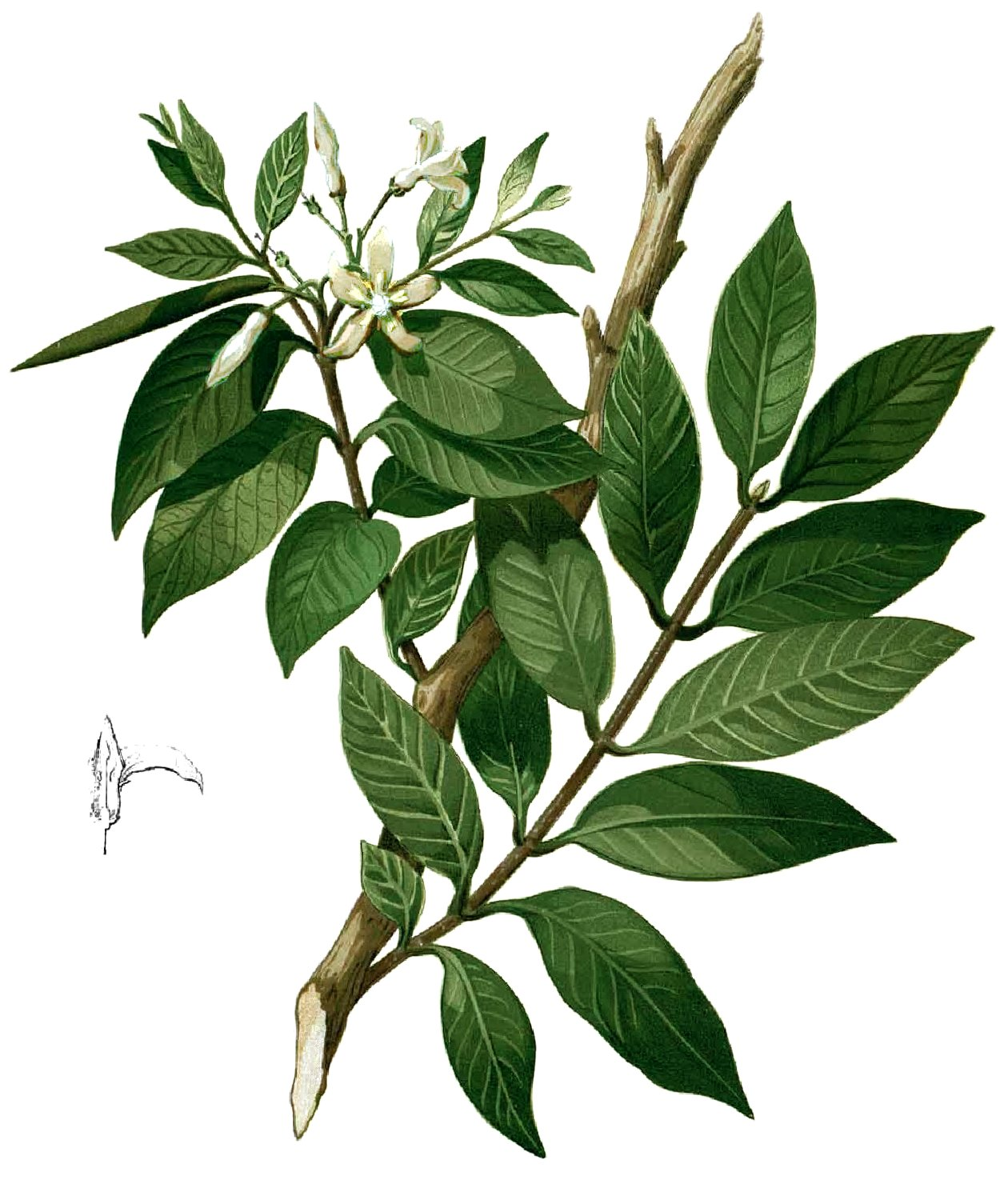

Scientific classification
- Kingdom: Plantae
- Clade: Tracheophytes
- Clade: Angiosperms
- Clade: Eudicots
- Clade: Asterids
- Order: Gentianales
- Family: Apocynaceae
- Genus: Wrightia
- Species: W. pubescens

Binomial name
- Wrightia pubescens R.Br., 1811

Synonyms
- Nerium macrocarpum Span. [Invalid]; Wrightia javanica A.DC.; Wrightia calycina A.DC.; Wrightia kwangtungensis Tsiang; Wrightia multiflora Zipp. ex Span. [Invalid]; Wrightia spanogheana Miq.

= Wrightia pubescens =

Species of tree

Wrightia pubescens is a species of small tree in the family Apocynaceae. Its distribution includes: Australia (Northern Territory, Queensland), southern China, Taiwan (introduced), Indonesia (Java, Lesser Sunda Isl., Moluccas, Sulawesi, Sumatra), New Guinea, Philippines (Masbate, Panay, Guimaras, Negros, Cebu, Biliran, Leyte, Mindanao) and Indo-China (Cambodia, Malaysia, Thailand, Viet Nam). In Viet Nam, it may be called: lòng mức lông.

== Subspecies ==
The Catalogue of Life lists:

- W. pubescens laniti (Blanco) Ngan
- W. pubescens penicillata (F.M.Bailey) Ngan
- W. pubescens pubescens R. Br
