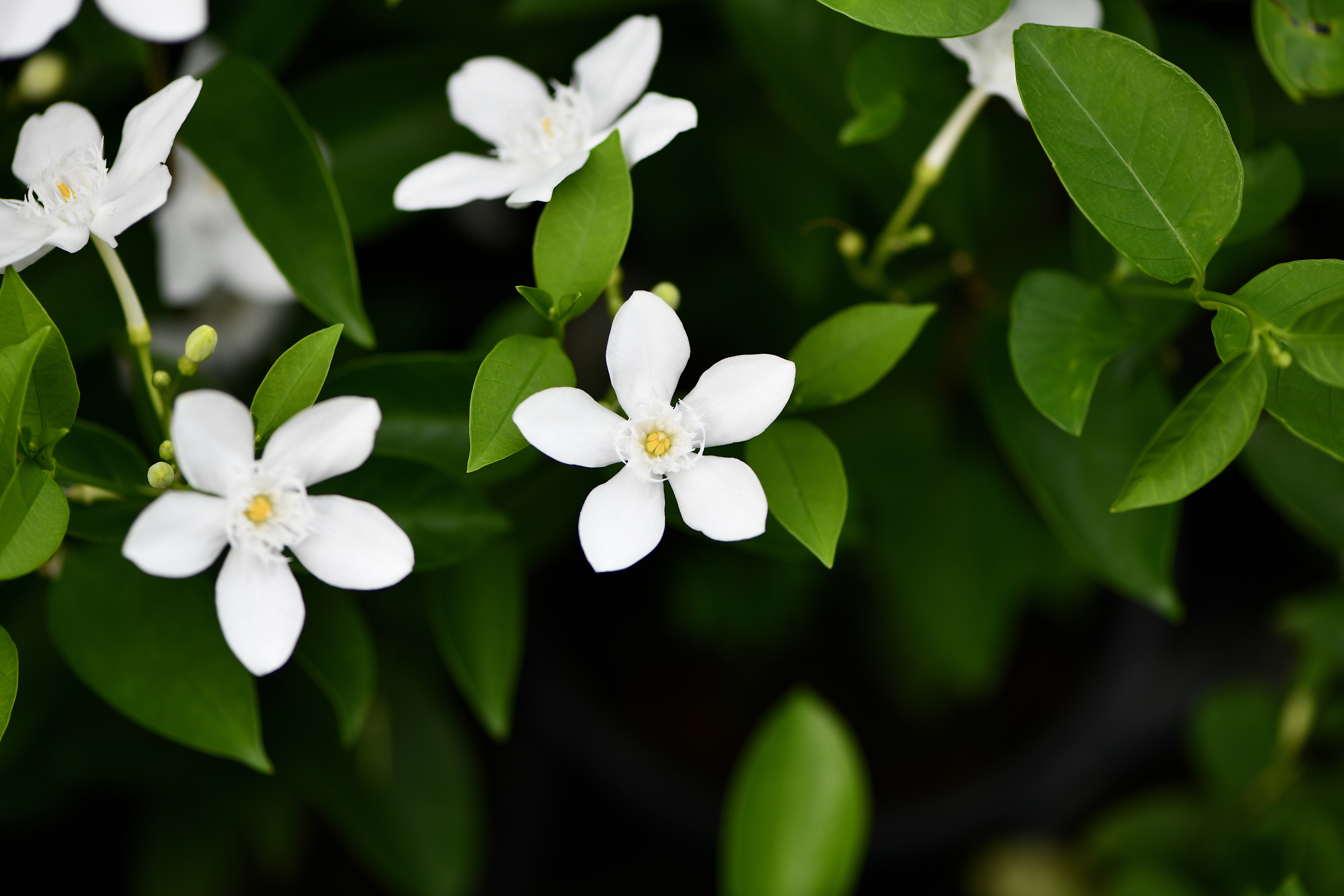
- Flowers

Scientific classification
- Kingdom: Plantae
- Clade: Embryophytes
- Clade: Tracheophytes
- Clade: Angiosperms
- Clade: Eudicots
- Clade: Asterids
- Order: Gentianales
- Family: Apocynaceae
- Genus: Wrightia
- Species: W. antidysenterica

Binomial name
- Wrightia antidysenterica (L.) R.Br.

Synonyms
- Echites antidysentericus (L.) Roxb.; Nerium antidysentericum L.; Walidda antidysenterica (L.) Pichon; Nerium zeylanicum L.; Wrightia zeylanica (L.) R.Br.

= Wrightia antidysenterica =

Species of plant

Wrightia antidysenterica, the coral swirl, white angel or snowflake, is a flowering plant in the family Apocynaceae. It is native to Sri Lanka. Wrightia antidysenterica is sometimes confused with the species Holarrhena pubescens due to a second, taxonomically invalid publication of the name Holarrhena pubescens. It is known in Sanskrit as kuṭaja or ambikā.

== Uses ==
The juice of this plant is a potent ingredient for a mixture of wall plaster, according to the Samarāṅgaṇa Sūtradhāra, which is a Sanskrit treatise dealing with Śilpaśāstra (Hindu science of art and construction). It is used as a traditional medicinal plant.
