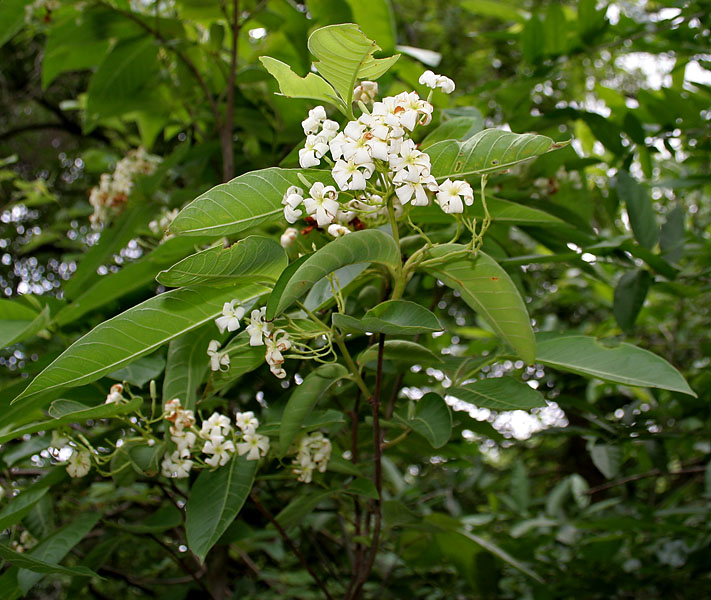
- In Andhra Pradesh, India

Conservation status
- Least Concern (IUCN 3.1)

Scientific classification
- Kingdom: Plantae
- Clade: Embryophytes
- Clade: Tracheophytes
- Clade: Angiosperms
- Clade: Eudicots
- Clade: Asterids
- Order: Gentianales
- Family: Apocynaceae
- Genus: Holarrhena
- Species: H. pubescens

Binomial name
- Holarrhena pubescens Wall. ex G.Don

Synonyms
- List: Chonemorpha pubescens (Wall. ex G.Don) G.Don; Elytropus pubescens (Wall. ex G.Don) Miers; Chonemorpha antidysenterica G.Don; Holarrhena antidysenterica (G.Don) Wall. ex A.DC.; Holarrhena codaga G.Don; Holarrhena febrifuga Klotzsch; Holarrhena fischeri K.Schum.; Holarrhena glaberrima Markgr.; Holarrhena glabra Klotzsch; Holarrhena macrocarpa (Hassk.) Fern.-Vill.; Holarrhena malaccensis Wight; Holarrhena perrotii Spire; Holarrhena pierrei Spire; Holarrhena tettensis Klotzsch; Holarrhena villosa Aiton ex Loudon; Nerium sinense W.Hunter; Physetobasis macrocarpa Hassk.

= Holarrhena pubescens =

Species of flowering plant

Holarrhena pubescens, the fever pod, kurchi bark, Tellicherry bark or conessi, is a species of flowering plant in the family Apocynaceae. It is native to central and southern Africa, the Indian subcontinent, Indochina, and parts of China. Holarrhena pubescens is sometimes confused with the species Wrightia antidysenterica due to a second, taxonomically invalid publication of the name Holarrhena pubescens. In Cambodia, it is called /tɨk dɑh kʰlaː thɔm/ ទឹកដោះខ្លាធំ big tiger milk or /kʰlaɛɲ kŭəŋ/ ខ្លែងគង់ invulnerable kite. These seeds are sold as indraja (इनद्राजा) for Ayurvedic medicine in India.

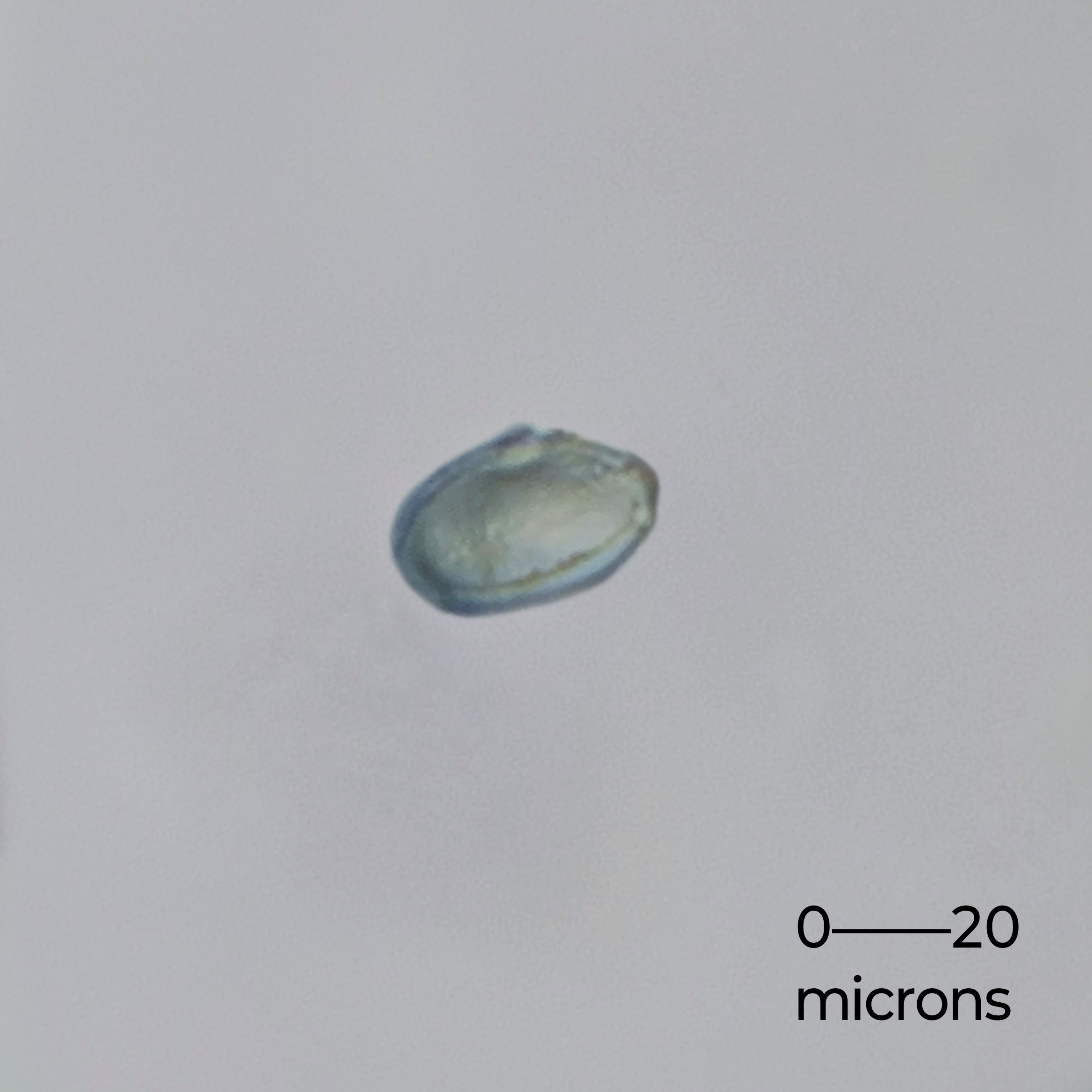
Pollen grains of Holarrhena pubescens
