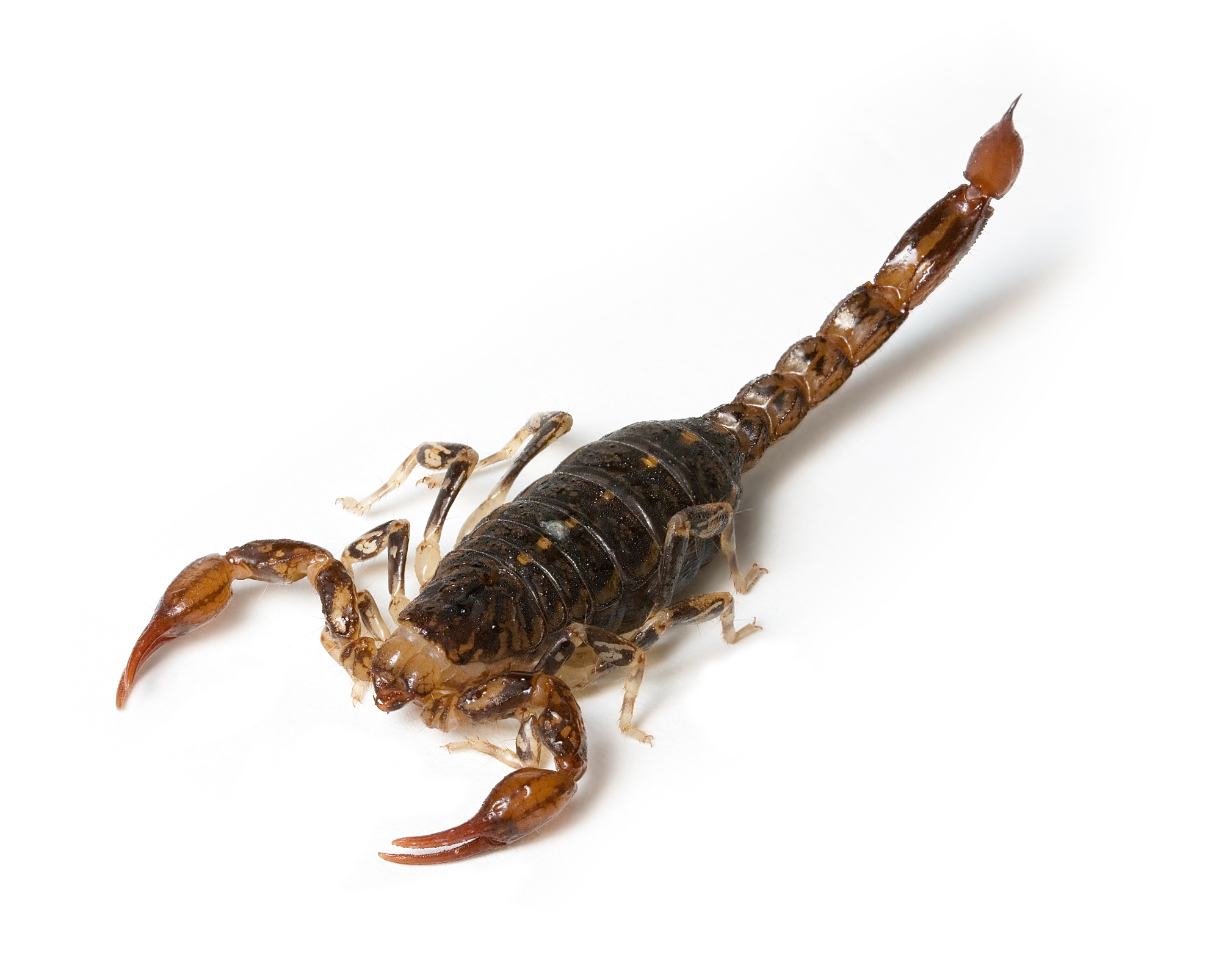

Scientific classification
- Kingdom: Animalia
- Phylum: Arthropoda
- Subphylum: Chelicerata
- Class: Arachnida
- Order: Scorpiones
- Family: Bothriuridae
- Genus: Cercophonius
- Species: C. squama

Binomial name
- Cercophonius squama (Gervais, 1844)

= Cercophonius squama =

Species of scorpion

Cercophonius squama, commonly known as the forest scorpion or wood scorpion, is a scorpion native to south-eastern Australia. It is typically around 25–40 mm (0.98–1.57 in) long. Its colour consists of different shades of brown.

== Description ==
The body is creamy yellow to orange-brown with dark brown variegations. The legs are yellow with some dark brown pigment.

== Distribution and habitat ==
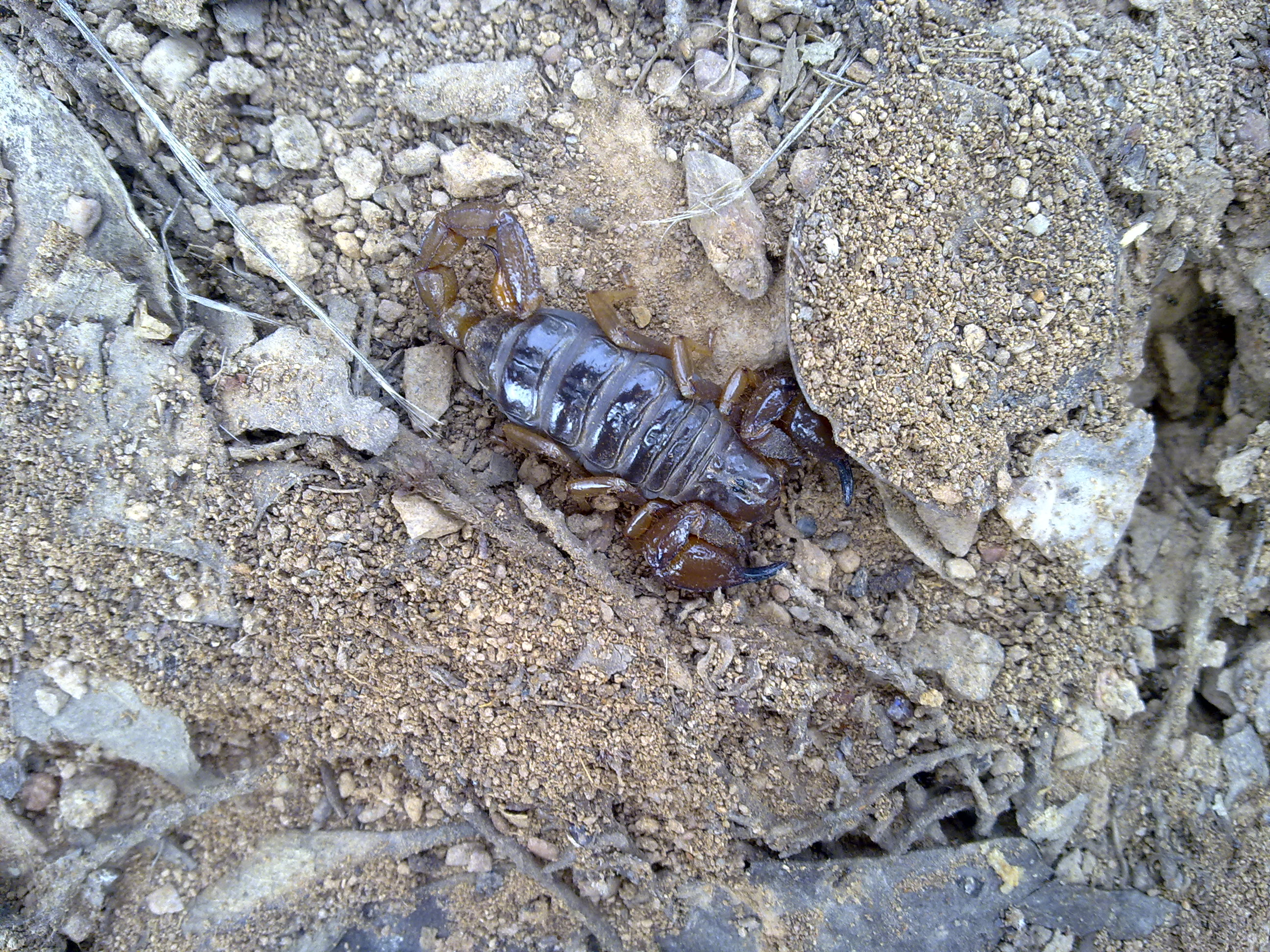
A Cercophonius squama as seen in situ near the Australian Capital Territory.

Cercophonius squama is found in South Australia, Victoria, New South Wales, the ACT and Tasmania. It is the only scorpion found in Tasmania.

== Behaviour ==
They have been proven to be slightly defensive, nocturnal—like most scorpions—and sedentary, meaning that it is highly unlikely for them to migrate when there are extreme environmental changes. Accustomed to a wetter climate, these scorpions can dig shallower or deeper burrows, depending on the situation, to avoid environmental extremes for several months.

=== Breeding ===
Insemination occurs before winter and birth typically occurs during summer. Females give birth to 20-30 live young over a period of several hours. The young are white and soft-bodied at birth. Females have been observed selectively eating some of the young but the trigger is not known. It takes approximately two weeks for the exoskeleton to completely form for newborns.
