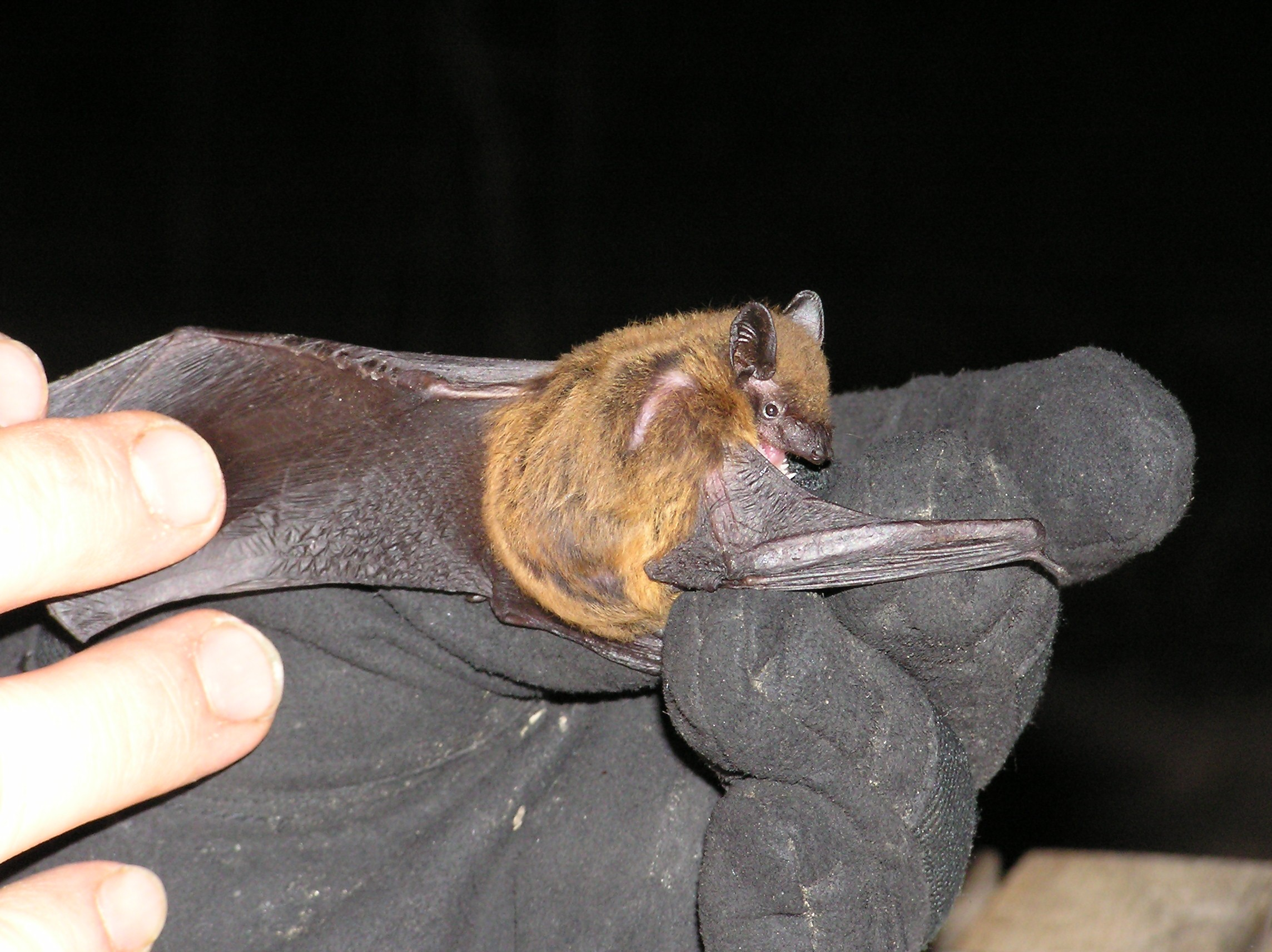
- Evening bat (Nycticeius humeralis)

Scientific classification
- Domain: Eukaryota
- Kingdom: Animalia
- Phylum: Chordata
- Class: Mammalia
- Order: Chiroptera
- Family: Vespertilionidae
- Subfamily: Vespertilioninae
- Tribe: Nycticeiini; Gervais, 1855
- Genus: Nycticeius; Rafinesque, 1819

Type species
- Vespertilio humeralis (Rafinesque, 1818)

Species
- 3, See text.

Synonyms
- Nycticea Le Conte, 1831; Nycticejus Temminck, 1827; Nycticeus Lesson, 1827; Nycticeyx Wagler, 1830

= Nycticeius =

Genus of bats

Nycticeius is a small genus of bats in the vesper bat family, Vespertilionidae, and the only member of the tribe Nycticeiini. It contains three species, the evening bat (N. humeralis), the Cuban evening bat (N. cubanus) and Nycticeius aenobarbus. Some authorities include several other Old World species in Nycticeius, but recent genetic work shows that is a completely New World genus. Nycticeius is of Greek and Latin origin, meaning "belonging to the night".

The Cuban evening bat is found only on the island of Cuba, and very little is known about this species. It is similar in appearance to N. humeralis, but is considerably smaller (4–7 grams).

== Species ==
- Nycticeius aenobarbus (Temminck, 1840) – Temminck's mysterious bat
- Nycticeius cubanus (Gundlach, 1861) – Cuban evening bat
- Nycticeius humeralis (Rafinesque, 1818) – evening bat
