= B. ehrenbergii =

B. ehrenbergii may refer to:

- Barbula ehrenbergii, a Western Australian moss
- Bartlettina ehrenbergii, a flowering plant
- Brachistosternus ehrenbergii, a South American scorpion
