= Atacama myotis =

Conservation status
- Endangered (IUCN 3.1)

Scientific classification
- Kingdom: Animalia
- Phylum: Chordata
- Class: Mammalia
- Order: Chiroptera
- Family: Vespertilionidae
- Genus: Myotis
- Species: M. atacamensis

Binomial name
- Myotis atacamensis Lataste, 1892
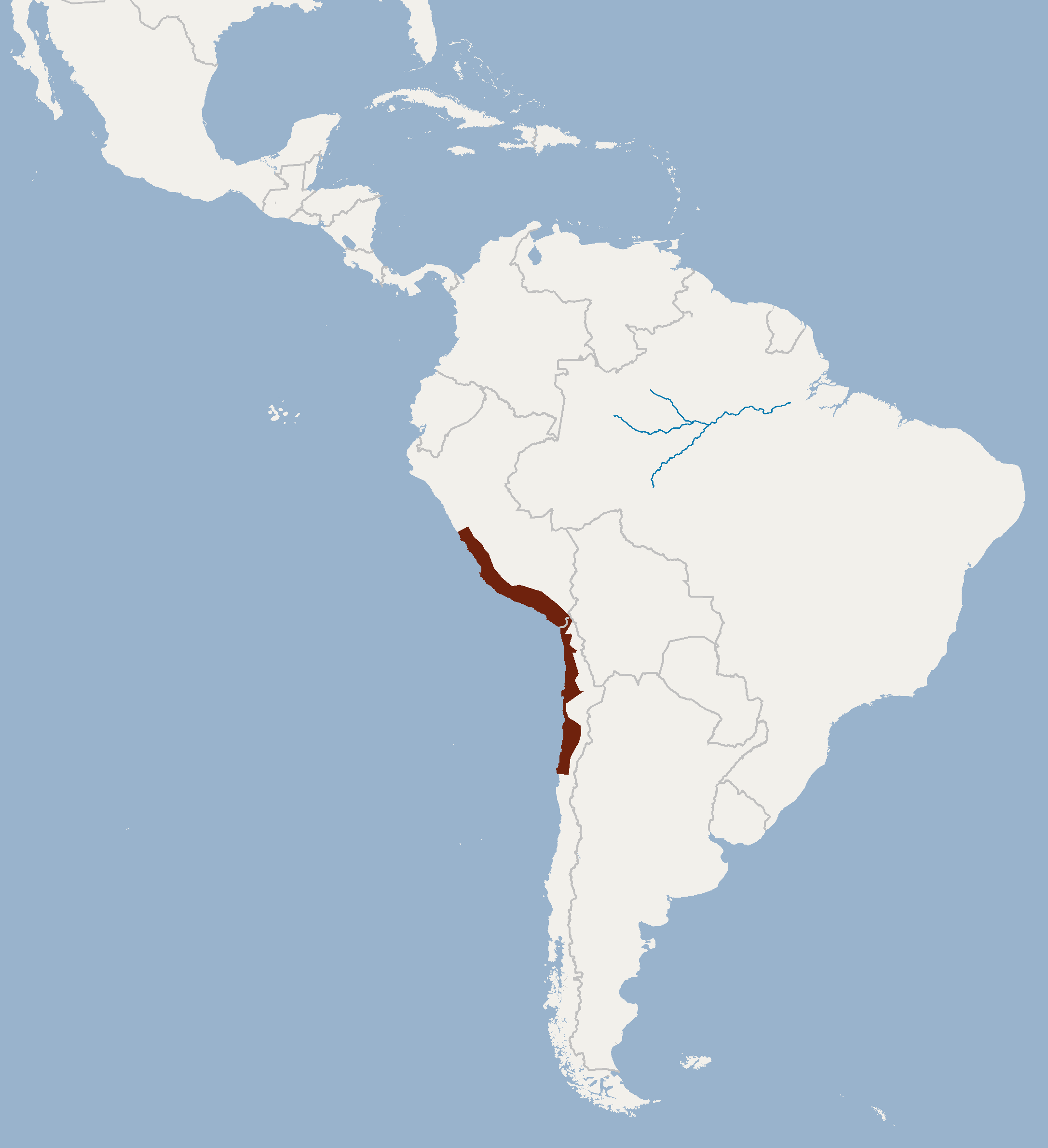

Synonyms
- Myotis chiloensis atacamensis, Vespertilio atacamensis

Species of plant

The Atacama myotis (Myotis atacamensis) is a species of vesper bat in the family Vespertilionidae. It is found in Chile and Peru, specifically throughout the Atacama Desert in the Chilean matorral. It is one of the smallest Myotis species, with a height of around 4–5 cm (1.6–2.0 in). The species was first discovered in the Atacama Desert, which is where its name comes from.

== Taxonomy ==
The Atacama myotis is one of 22 recognized species of myotis in South America, and one of over 140 species worldwide. This species was first described in 1892 by French zoologist Fernand Lataste based on three samples collected in 1885 from San Pedro de Atacama, Antofagasta, Chile, located in the central part of the Atacama Desert. Several have classified the Atacama myotis as a subspecies of the Chilean myotis in 1943 and 1958. Lataste originally classified the species as Vespertilio atacamensis and thought that it differed greatly from the Chilean myotis because it is much smaller, it has a different skull shape, and its teeth are different. In 1973, it was again listed as a species, which has been maintained at present.

== Description ==
The Atacama myotis was originally thought to be a subspecies of the Chilean myotis, but these two species have distinct morphological differences. The Atacama myotis is smaller than the Chilean myotis, weighing only 4–6 g (0.14–0.21 oz) and having a forearm length of 31.3–39.5 mm (1.23–1.56 in). It is similar in size to the recently discovered Myotis diminutus, but the two can be differentiated by their uropatagia. In the Atacama myotis, the dorsal side of the uropatagium is furred until halfway between the knee and ankle. In M. diminutus, the dorsal side of the uropatagium is almost naked. The dorsal fur color of the Atacama myotis is tricolored, with a black base leading to a lighter brown tip color. It also has a unique echolocation call, which has a much further range than other myotis species in Chile.

== Behavior & Ecology ==
The Atacama myotis is a colonial species, forming groups of around 30 individuals. They are insectivorous, beginning their foraging an hour before dusk and continuing for the first two hours of the night when prey availability is at its peak. They have also been observed roosting and hunting near streetlamps and structures within rural villages, providing evidence for them being a synanthropic species.

The average lifespan of the Atacama myotis is 5-10 years, which sexual maturity occurring after 1-2 years of development. Female bats undergo a gestation period of around 3-4 months, which is relatively long compared to bat species elsewhere. Each birth usually contains only one baby, called a pup, which is born fully developed and reaches independence after 6-8 weeks.

Due to the arid conditions of its habitat range, the Atacama myotis can enter a state of torpor in order to conserve water. This adaptation is similar to hibernation, but it has a much shorter duration and is not linked to seasonality. When in a torpor state, the bat's metabolic rate is significantly decreased which allows it to conserve energy in times of scarce food or water. It is also the only neotropical Myotis that has periods of this hibernation.

== Distribution & habitat ==
The Atacama myotis has an extant range that stretches from southern Peru to the north and central parts of Chile, specifically within the Atacama Desert. Recent records also found evidence of this species in the Choapa Province in La Campana National Park, increasing the known range. The landscape through this region includes deserts and semi-arid environments, with the only vegetation being thorny scrub and sclerophyllous forests. Their diurnal roosts are located within rock crevices and caves, or in roof edifications of barns or churches in rural communities.

== Conservation ==
As of 2016, the Atacama myotis is listed as an endangered species according to the IUCN Red List. Previously, this species was listed as vulnerable after a survey in 1996 and then reclassified to near threatened in 2008. Although they have a wide range of distribution, the bat's populations are severely fragmented and its overall area of occupancy (AOO) is less than 200 km^{2} (77 sq mi). Additionally, over the next three generations (18 years) the population is expected to decline by more than 30% as well as a projected habitat quality degradation over the same time period. One major threat to their habitats are the increase in wind farms throughout the region. Chile is one of the leading countries throughout South America in their development of wind farms, which has become a major cause of bat deaths worldwide. Other threats include mining, urban development, and agricultural changes, all of which affect the bat's habitat and species composition.
