= Cuban evening bat =

Conservation status
- Near Threatened (IUCN 3.1)

Scientific classification
- Kingdom: Animalia
- Phylum: Chordata
- Class: Mammalia
- Order: Chiroptera
- Family: Vespertilionidae
- Genus: Nycticeius
- Species: N. cubanus

Binomial name
- Nycticeius cubanus Gundlach, 1861

Species of bat

The Cuban evening bat (Nycticeius cubanus) is a species of bat in the vesper bat family, Vespertilionidae, that is endemic to western Cuba. It is a small bat, even smaller than cogener Nycticeius humeralis. It is insectivorous, but otherwise little is known about its behavior and diet.
