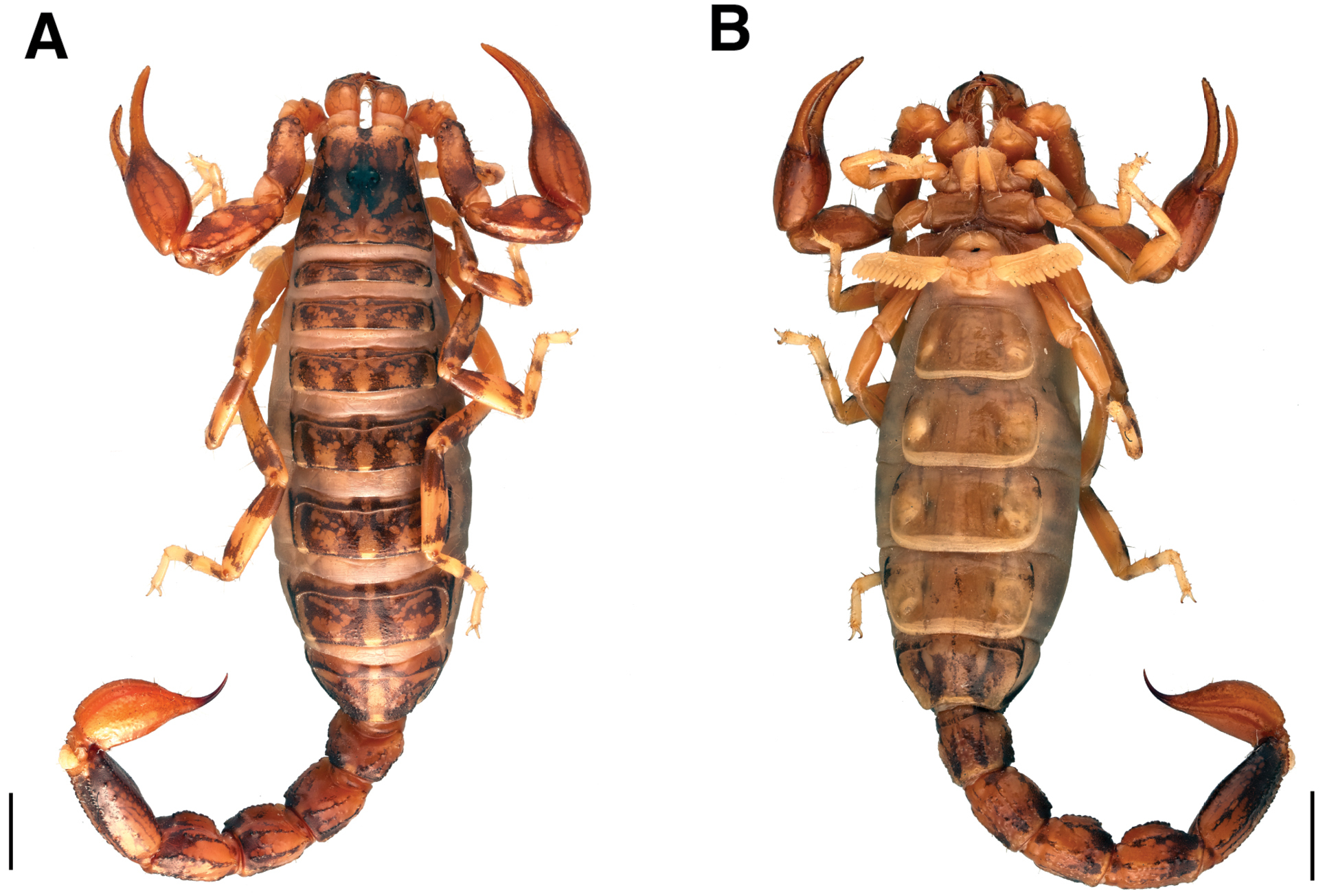
- Female lectotype – dorsal (A) and ventral (B) views

Scientific classification
- Kingdom: Animalia
- Phylum: Arthropoda
- Subphylum: Chelicerata
- Class: Arachnida
- Order: Scorpiones
- Family: Bothriuridae
- Genus: Cercophonius
- Species: C. granulosus

Binomial name
- Cercophonius granulosus Kraepelin, 1908

= Cercophonius granulosus =

Species of scorpion

Cercophonius granulosus is a species of small scorpion in the Bothriuridae family. It occurs in south-west Western Australia, and was first described in 1908 by German naturalist Karl Kraepelin.
