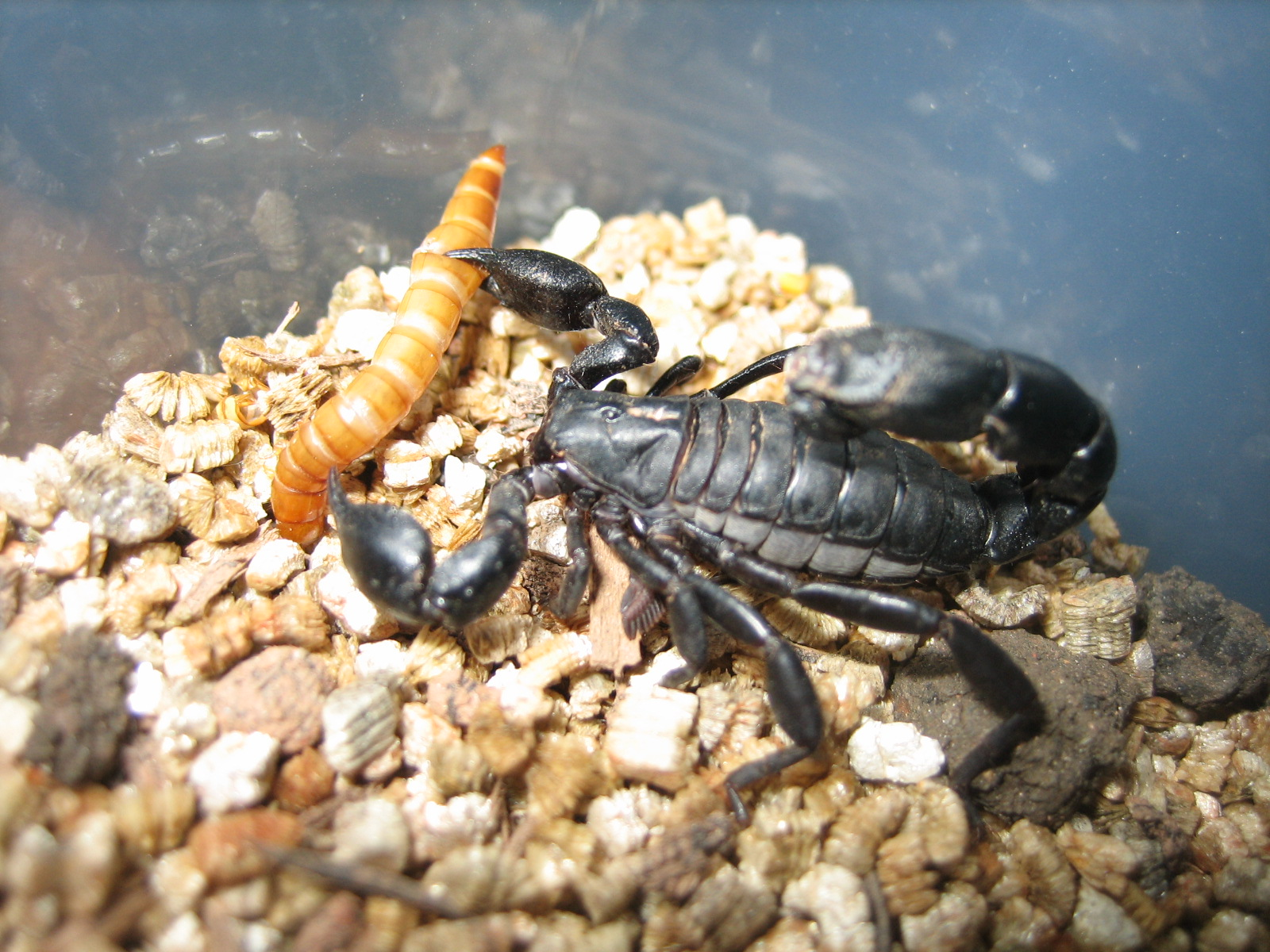
- Bothriurus bonariensis

Scientific classification
- Domain: Eukaryota
- Kingdom: Animalia
- Phylum: Arthropoda
- Subphylum: Chelicerata
- Class: Arachnida
- Order: Scorpiones
- Family: Bothriuridae
- Genus: Bothriurus; Peters, 1861

Type species
- Brotheas bonariensis Koch, 1842

= Bothriurus =

Genus of scorpions

Bothriurus is a genus of Neotropical scorpions in the family Bothriuridae. They occur in many different habitats in South America, including deserts, steppes, savannas and forests.

== Species ==
The following species are included in the genus Bothriurus:

- Bothriurus aguardente Santos-da-Silva, Carvalho & Brescovit, 2017
- Bothriurus araguayae Vellard, 1934
- Bothriurus asper Pocock, 1893
- Bothriurus bertae Abalos, 1955
- Bothriurus bocki Kraepelin, 1911
- Bothriurus bonariensis (C. L. Koch, 1842)
- Bothriurus buecherli San Martín, 1934
- Bothriurus burmeisteri Kraepelin, 1894
- Bothriurus ceii Ojanguren Affilastro, 2007
- Bothriurus cerradoensis Lourenço et al., 2004
- Bothriurus chacoensis Maury & Acosta, 1993
- Bothriurus chilensis (Molina, 1782)
- Bothriurus cordubensis Acosta, 1955
- Bothriurus coriaceus Pocock, 1893
- Bothriurus delmari Santos-da-Silva, Carvalho & Brescovit, 2017
- Bothriurus dumayi (Cekalovic, 1974)
- Bothriurus flavidus Kraepelin, 1911
- Bothriurus guarani Maury, 1984
- Bothriurus huincul Mattoni, 2007
- Bothriurus illudens Mello-Leitão, 1947
- Bothriurus inermis Maury, 1981
- Bothriurus jesuita Ojanguren Affilastro, 2003
- Bothriurus keyserlingi Pocock, 1893
- Bothriurus maculatus Kraepelin, 1911
- Bothriurus mochaensis Cekalovic, 1982
- Bothriurus moojeni Mello-Leitão, 1945
- Bothriurus nendai Ojanguren Affilastro & Garcia-Mauro, 2010
- Bothriurus noa Maury, 1984
- Bothriurus olaen Acosta, 1997
- Bothriurus pampa Ojanguren Affilastro, 2002
- Bothriurus patagonicus Maury, 1968
- Bothriurus pichicuy Mattoni, 2002
- Bothriurus picunche Mattoni, 2002
- Bothriurus pora Mattoni & Acosta, 2005
- Bothriurus prospicuus Mello-Leitão, 1932
- Bothriurus rochai Mello-Leitão, 1932
- Bothriurus rochensis San Martín, 1965
- Bothriurus rubescens Mello-Leitão, 1947
- Bothriurus sanctacrucis Mattoni, 2007
- Bothriurus signatus Pocock, 1893
- Bothriurus sooretamensis San Martín, 1966
- Bothriurus trivittatus Werner, 1939
- Bothriurus vachoni San Martín, 1968
- Bothriurus vittatus (Guerin Meneville, 1838)
- Bothriurus voyati Maury, 1973
- Bothriurus ypsilon Mello-Leitão, 1935
