= Cercophonius queenslandae =

Scientific classification
- Kingdom: Animalia
- Phylum: Arthropoda
- Subphylum: Chelicerata
- Class: Arachnida
- Order: Scorpiones
- Family: Bothriuridae
- Genus: Cercophonius
- Species: C. queenslandae

Binomial name
- Cercophonius queenslandae Acosta, 1990

Species of scorpion

Cercophonius queenslandae is a species of scorpion in the Bothriuridae family. It is native to Australia, where it occurs in eastern Queensland. It was first described in 1990 by Luis Acosta.
