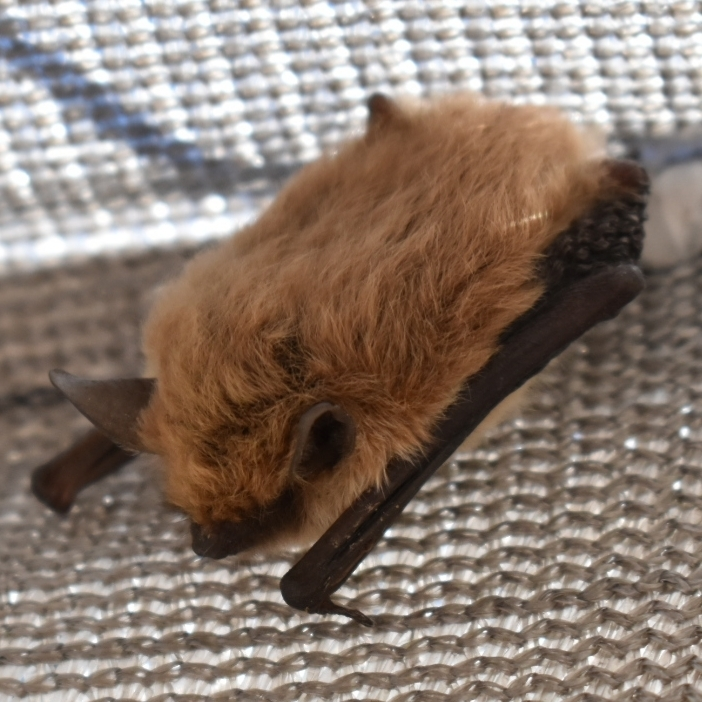
- In Córdoba, Argentina

Conservation status
- Least Concern (IUCN 3.1)

Scientific classification
- Kingdom: Animalia
- Phylum: Chordata
- Class: Mammalia
- Order: Chiroptera
- Family: Vespertilionidae
- Genus: Myotis
- Species: M. dinellii

Binomial name
- Myotis dinellii Thomas, 1902
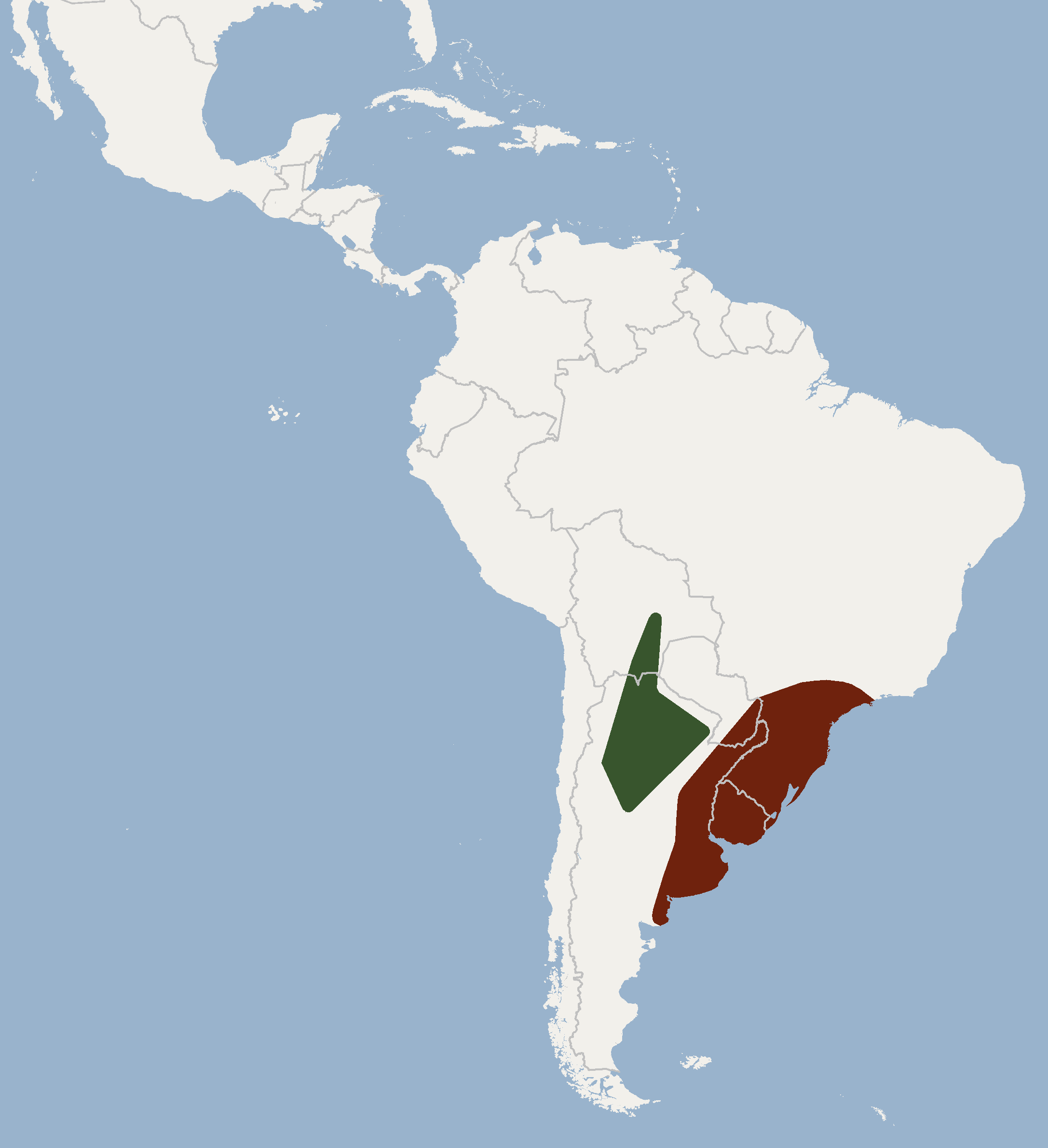
- Dinelli's myotis range in green, smaller than actual range

Synonyms
- Myotis levis dinellii

= Dinelli's myotis =

Species of bat

Dinelli's myotis (Myotis dinellii) is a species of vesper bat found in southern South America.

== Taxonomy ==
It was described in 1902 by Oldfield Thomas. It was previously considered a subspecies of the yellowish myotis (M. levis), but was split as a distinct species by the IUCN Red List in 2006 following a publication that split both species. A 2013 study confirmed that both species were morphologically and genetically distinct from one another, and they were also split as distinct species by ITIS.

== Distribution and habitat ==
It ranges from central Bolivia south throughout western & central Argentina and easternmost Chile. It roosts in many different places, including artificial structures. The IUCN Red List also lists it occurring in southeastern Brazil, which is also inhabited by M. levis, although the American Society of Mammalogists does not.
