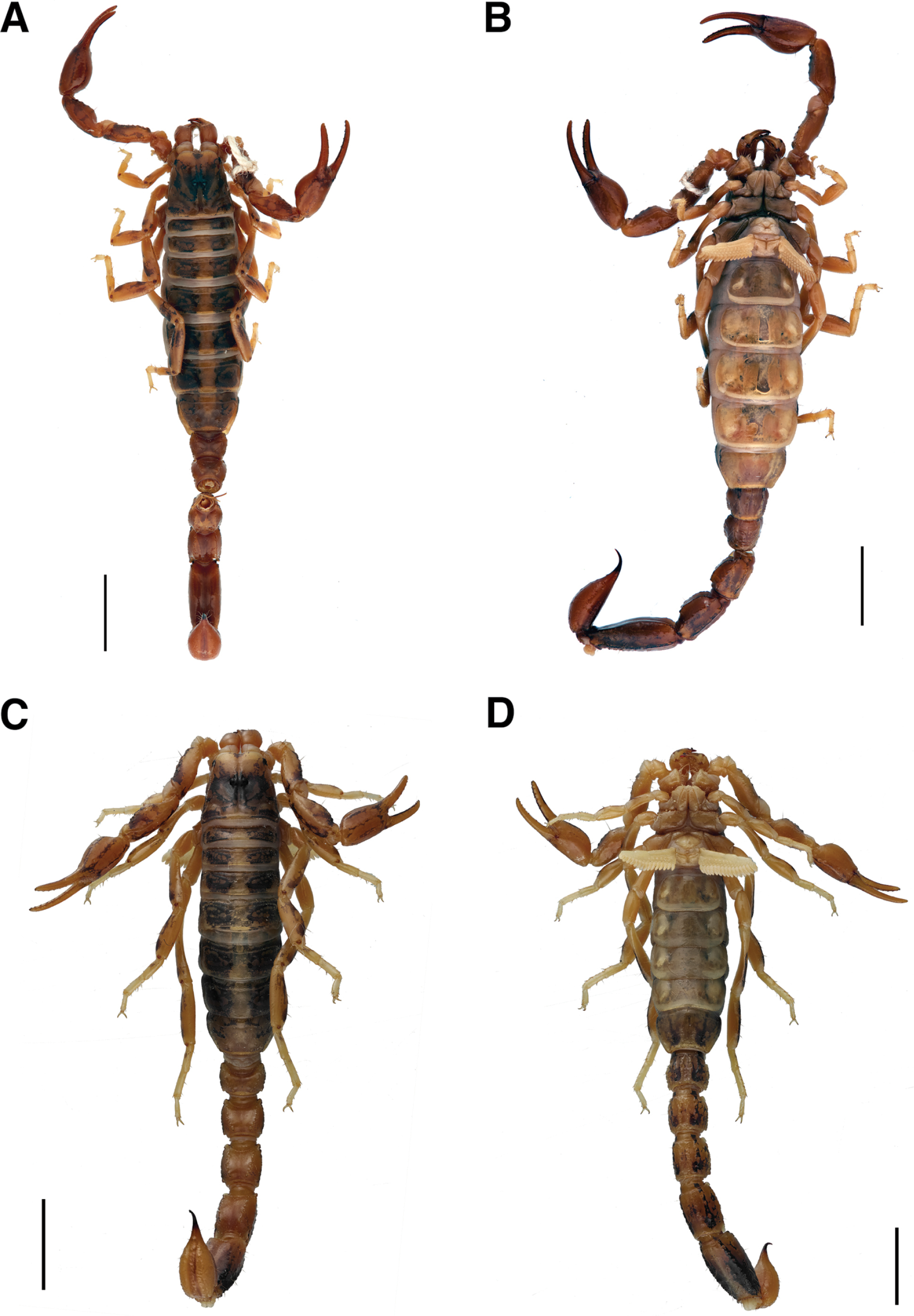

Scientific classification
- Kingdom: Animalia
- Phylum: Arthropoda
- Subphylum: Chelicerata
- Class: Arachnida
- Order: Scorpiones
- Family: Bothriuridae
- Genus: Cercophonius
- Species: C. michaelseni

Binomial name
- Cercophonius michaelseni Kraepelin, 1908

= Cercophonius michaelseni =

Species of scorpion

Cercophonius michaelseni is a species of scorpion in the Bothriuridae family. It occurs in Western Australia, and was first described in 1908 by German naturalist Karl Kraepelin. The specific epithet michaelseni honours German zoologist Wilhelm Michaelsen.
