= Cercophonius kershawi =

Scientific classification
- Kingdom: Animalia
- Phylum: Arthropoda
- Subphylum: Chelicerata
- Class: Arachnida
- Order: Scorpiones
- Family: Bothriuridae
- Genus: Cercophonius
- Species: C. kershawi

Binomial name
- Cercophonius kershawi Glauert, 1930

Species of scorpion

Cercophonius kershawi, also known as the mallee wood scorpion, is a species of scorpion in the Bothriuridae family. It is native to south-eastern Australia, and was first described in 1930 by Australian paleontologist and Western Australian Museum curator Ludwig Glauert.
