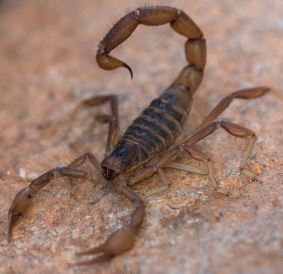
- Brachistosternus chimba

Scientific classification
- Kingdom: Animalia
- Phylum: Arthropoda
- Subphylum: Chelicerata
- Class: Arachnida
- Order: Scorpiones
- Family: Bothriuridae
- Genus: Brachistosternus; Pocock, 1893

= Brachistosternus =

Genus of scorpions

Brachistosternus is a scorpion genus in the Bothriuridae family. B. ehrenbergii is the most cited species in the genus. The genus is distributed in Argentina, Bolivia, Brazil, Chile, Colombia, Ecuador, Paraguay, and Peru.

== Species ==
Brachistosternus contains the following fifty species:

- Brachistosternus aconcagua Ojanguren Affilastro & Luisa-Scioscia, 2007
- Brachistosternus alienus Lönnberg, 1898
- Brachistosternus anandrovestigia Ojanguren Affilastro, Pizarro-Araya & Ochoa, 2018
- Brachistosternus andinus Chamberlin, 1916
- Brachistosternus angustimanus Ojanguren Affilastro & Roig Alsina, 2001
- Brachistosternus artigasi Cekalovic, 1974
- Brachistosternus barrigai Ojanguren Affilastro & Pizarro-Araya, 2014
- Brachistosternus castroi Mello-Leitao, 1940 (nomen dubium)
- Brachistosternus cekalovici Ojanguren Affilastro, 2005
- Brachistosternus cepedai Ojanguren Affilastro, Augusto, Pizarro-Araya & Mattoni, 2007
- Brachistosternus chango Ojanguren Affilastro, Mattoni & Prendini, 2007
- Brachistosternus chilensis Kraepelin, 1911
- Brachistosternus chimba Ojanguren Affilastro, Alfaro & Pizarro-Araya, 2021
- Brachistosternus contisuyu Ojanguren Affilastro, Pizarro-Araya & Ochoa, 2018
- Brachistosternus coquimbo Ojanguren Affilastro, Augusto, Pizarro-Araya & Mattoni, 2007
- Brachistosternus donosoi Cekalovic, 1974
- Brachistosternus ehrenbergii (Gervais, 1841)
- Brachistosternus ferrugineus (Thorell, 1876)
- Brachistosternus gayi Ojanguren Affilastro, Pizarro-Araya & Ochoa, 2018
- Brachistosternus galianoae Ojanguren Affilastro, 2002
- Brachistosternus holmbergi Carbonell, 1923 (nomen dubium)
- Brachistosternus intermedius Lönnberg, 1902
- Brachistosternus kamanchaca Ojanguren Affilastro, Mattoni & Prendini, 2007
- Brachistosternus kovariki Ojanguren Affilastro, 2003
- Brachistosternus llullaillaco Ojanguren Affilastro, Alfaro & Pizarro-Araya, 2021
- Brachistosternus mattonii Ojanguren Affilastro, 2005
- Brachistosternus misti Ojanguren Affilastro, Pizarro-Araya & Ochoa, 2018
- Brachistosternus montanus Roig Alsina, 1977
- Brachistosternus multidentatus Maury, 1984
- Brachistosternus negrei Cekalovic, 1975
- Brachistosternus ninapo Ochoa, 2004
- Brachistosternus ochoai Ojanguren Affilastro, 2004
- Brachistosternus paposo Ojanguren Affilastro & Pizarro-Araya, 2014
- Brachistosternus paulae Ojanguren Affilastro, 2003
- Brachistosternus pegnai Cekalovic, 1969
- Brachistosternus pentheri Mello-Leitao, 1931
- Brachistosternus perettii Ojanguren Affilastro & Mattoni, 2006
- Brachistosternus peruvianus Toledo Piza, 1974
- Brachistosternus philippii Ojanguren Affilastro, Pizarro-Araya & Ochoa, 2018
- Brachistosternus piacentinii Ojanguren Affilastro, 2003
- Brachistosternus prendinii Ojanguren Affilastro, 2003
- Brachistosternus quiscapata Ochoa & Acosta, 2002
- Brachistosternus roigalsinai Ojanguren Affilastro, 2002
- Brachistosternus sciosciae Ojanguren Affilastro, 2002
- Brachistosternus simoneae Lourenço, 2000 (nomen dubium)
- Brachistosternus telteca Ojanguren Affilastro, 2000
- Brachistosternus titicaca Ochoa & Acosta, 2002
- Brachistosternus turpuq Ochoa, 2002
- Brachistosternus weyenberghi (Thorell, 1876)
- Brachistosternus zambrunoi Ojanguren Affilastro, 2002
