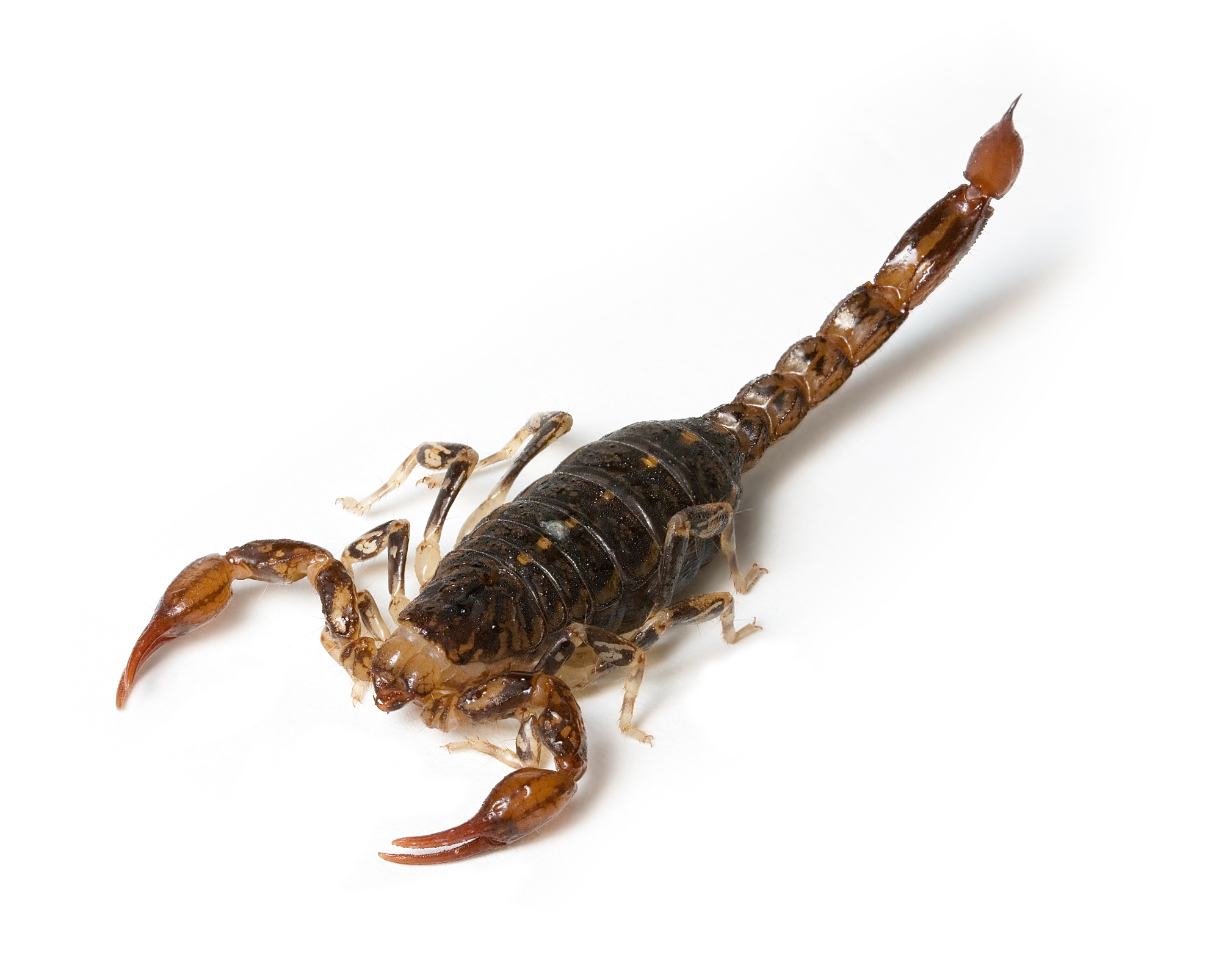
- Cercophonius squama

Scientific classification
- Kingdom: Animalia
- Phylum: Arthropoda
- Subphylum: Chelicerata
- Class: Arachnida
- Order: Scorpiones
- Superfamily: Scorpionoidea
- Family: Bothriuridae; Simon, 1880

= Bothriuridae =

Family of scorpions

The Bothriuridae are a family of scorpions, comprising 151 species in 16 genera.

The family has representatives in temperate and subtropical habitats from four continents: South America, Africa, Asia, and Australia. One genus (Cercophonius) has recently been discovered in the Himalayas.

The members of this family have a unique feature - the normally pentagonal sternum consists of two transverse bars (except Liposoma and Tehuankea) and is several times broader than long.

== Genus and species ==
Bothriurus Peters, 1861

- Bothriurus araguayae Vellard, 1934
- Bothriurus asper Pocock, 1893
- Bothriurus bertae Abalos, 1955
- Bothriurus bocki Kraepelin, 1911
- Bothriurus bonariensis (C. L. Koch, 1842)
- Bothriurus buecherli San Martín, 1934
- Bothriurus burmeisteri Kraepelin, 1894
- Bothriurus ceii Ojanguren Affilastro, 2007
- Bothriurus cerradoensis Lourenço et al., 2004
- Bothriurus chacoensis Maury & Acosta, 1993
- Bothriurus chilensis (Molina, 1782)
- Bothriurus cordubensis Acosta, 1955
- Bothriurus coriaceus Pocock, 1893
- Bothriurus dumayi (Cekalovic, 1974)
- Bothriurus flavidus Kraepelin, 1911
- Bothriurus guarani Maury, 1984
- Bothriurus huincul Mattoni, 2007
- Bothriurus illudens Mello-Leitão, 1947
- Bothriurus inermis Maury, 1981
- Bothriurus jesuita Ojanguren Affilastro, 2003
- Bothriurus keyserlingi Pocock, 1893
- Bothriurus maculatus Kraepelin, 1911
- Bothriurus mochaensis Cekalovic, 1982
- Bothriurus moojeni Mello-Leitão, 1945
- Bothriurus nendai Ojanguren Affilastro & Garcia-Mauro, 2010
- Bothriurus noa Maury, 1984
- Bothriurus olaen Acosta, 1997
- Bothriurus pampa Ojanguren Affilastro, 2002
- Bothriurus patagonicus Maury, 1968
- Bothriurus pichicuy Mattoni, 2002
- Bothriurus picunche Mattoni, 2002
- Bothriurus pora Mattoni & Acosta, 2005
- Bothriurus prospicuus Mello-Leitão, 1932
- Bothriurus rochai Mello-Leitão, 1932
- Bothriurus rochensis San Martín, 1965
- Bothriurus rubescens Mello-Leitão, 1947
- Bothriurus sanctacrucis Mattoni, 2007
- Bothriurus signatus Pocock, 1893
- Bothriurus sooretamensis San Martín, 1966
- Bothriurus trivittatus Werner, 1939
- Bothriurus vachoni San Martín, 1968
- Bothriurus vittatus (Guerin Meneville, 1838)
- Bothriurus voyati Maury, 1973
- Bothriurus ypsilon Mello-Leitão, 1935

Brachistosternus Pocock, 1893

- Brachistosternus aconcagua Ojanguren Affilastro & Luisa-Scioscia, 2007
- Brachistosternus alienus Lönnberg, 1898
- Brachistosternus andinus Chamberlin, 1916
- Brachistosternus angustimanus Ojanguren Affilastro & Roig Alsina, 2001
- Brachistosternus artigasi Cekalovic, 1974
- Brachistosternus castroi Mello-Leitão, 1940
- Brachistosternus cekalovici Ojanguren Affilastro, 2005
- Brachistosternus cepedai Ojanguren Affilastro et al., 2007
- Brachistosternus chango Ojanguren Affilastro et al., 2007
- Brachistosternus chilensis Kraepelin, 1911
- Brachistosternus coquimbo Ojanguren Affilastro et al., 2007
- Brachistosternus donosoi Cekalovic, 1974
- Brachistosternus ehrenbergii (Gervais, 1841)
- Brachistosternus ferrugineus (Thorell, 1876)
- Brachistosternus galianoae Ojanguren Affilastro, 2002
- Brachistosternus holmbergi Carbonell, 1923 [nomen dubium]
- Brachistosternus intermedius Lönnberg, 1902
- Brachistosternus kamanchaca Ojanguren Affilastro et al., 2007
- Brachistosternus kovariki Ojanguren Affilastro, 2003
- Brachistosternus mattonii Ojanguren Affilastro, 2005
- Brachistosternus montanus Roig Alsina, 1977
- Brachistosternus multidentatus Maury, 1984
- Brachistosternus negrei Cekalovic, 1975
- Brachistosternus ninapo Ochoa, 2004
- Brachistosternus ochoai Ojanguren Affilastro, 2004
- Brachistosternus paulae Ojanguren Affilastro, 2003
- Brachistosternus pegnai Cekalovic, 1969
- Brachistosternus pentheri Mello-Leitão, 1931
- Brachistosternus perettii Ojanguren Affilastro & Mattoni, 2006
- Brachistosternus peruvianus Toledo Piza, 1974
- Brachistosternus piacentinii Ojanguren Affilastro, 2003
- Brachistosternus prendini Ojanguren Affilastro, 2003
- Brachistosternus quiscapata Ochoa & Acosta, 2002
- Brachistosternus roigalsinai Ojanguren Affilastro, 2002
- Brachistosternus sciosciae Ojanguren Affilastro, 2002
- Brachistosternus simoneae Lourenço, 2000
- Brachistosternus telteca Ojanguren Affilastro, 2000
- Brachistosternus titicaca Ochoa & Acosta, 2002
- Brachistosternus turpuq Ochoa, 2002
- Brachistosternus weyenberghi (Thorell, 1876)
- Brachistosternus zambrunoi Ojanguren Affilastro, 2002

Brandbergia Prendini, 2003

- Brandbergia haringtoni Prendini, 2003

Brazilobothriurus Lourenço & Monod, 2000

- Brazilobothriurus pantanalensis Lourenço & Monod, 2000

Centromachetes Lønnberg, 1897

- Centromachetes obscurus Mello-Leitão, 1932
- Centromachetes pocockii (Kraepelin, 1894)
- Centromachetes titschaki (Werner, 1939)

Cercophonius Peters, 1861

- Cercophonius granulosus Kraepelin, 1908
- Cercophonius kershawi Glauert, 1930
- Cercophonius michaelseni Kraepelin, 1908
- Cercophonius queenslandae Acosta, 1990
- Cercophonius squama (Gervais, 1843)
- Cercophonius sulcatus Kraepelin, 1908

Lisposoma Lawrence, 1928

- Lisposoma elegans Lawrence, 1928
- Lisposoma joseehermana Lamoral, 1979

Orobothriurus Maury, 1975

- Orobothriurus alticola (Pocock, 1899)
- Orobothriurus ampay Ochoa & Acosta, 2003
- Orobothriurus atiquipa Ochoa & Acosta, 2002
- Orobothriurus calchaqui Ochoa et al., 2011
- Orobothriurus compagnuccii Ochoa et al., 2011
- Orobothriurus curvidigitus (Kraepelin, 1911)
- Orobothriurus famatina Acosta & Ochoa, 2001
- Orobothriurus grismadoi Ojanguren Affilastro et al., 2009
- Orobothriurus huascaran Ochoa et al., 2011
- Orobothriurus paessleri (Kraepelin, 1911)
- Orobothriurus parvus Maury, 1975
- Orobothriurus quewerukana Ochoa et al., 2011
- Orobothriurus ramirezi Ochoa et al., 2011
- Orobothriurus tamarugal Ochoa et al., 2011
- Orobothriurus wawita Acosta & Ochoa, 2000

Pachakutej Ochoa, 2004

- Pachakutej crassimanus (Maury, 1975)
- Pachakutej inca (Maury, 1975)
- Pachakutej iskay (Acosta & Ochoa, 2001)
- Pachakutej juchuicha Ochoa, 2004
- Pachakutej oscari Ochoa, 2004
- Pachakutej peruvianus (Mello-Leitão, 1948)

Phoniocercus Pocock, 1893

- Phoniocercus pictus Pocock, 1893
- Phoniocercus sanmartini Cekalovic, 1968

Rumikiru Ojanguren-Affilastro et al., 2012

- Rumikiru atacama Ojanguren-Affilastro et al., 2012
- Rumikiru lourençoi (Ojanguren Affilastro, 2003)

Tehuankea Cekalovic, 1973

- Tehuankea moyanoi Cekalovic, 1973

Thestylus Simon, 1880

- Thestylus aurantiurus Yamaguti & Pinto-da-Rocha, 2003
- Thestylus glasioui Bertkau, 1880
- Thestylus signatus Mello-Leitão, 1931 [species inquirenda]

Timogenes Simon, 1880

- Timogenes dorbignyi (Guérin Méneville, 1843)
- Timogenes elegans (Mello-Leitão, 1931)
- Timogenes haplochirus Maury & Roig Alsina, 1977
- Timogenes mapuche Maury, 1975
- Timogenes sumatranus Simon, 1880

Urophonius Pocock, 1893

- Urophonius achalensis Abalos & Hominal, 1974
- Urophonius brachycentrus (Thorell, 1876)
- Urophonius eugenicus (Mello-Leitão, 1931)
- Urophonius exochus (Penther, 1913)
- Urophonius granulatus Pocock, 1898
- Urophonius iheringi Pocock, 1893
- Urophonius mahuidensis Maury, 1973
- Urophonius martinezi Ojanguren Affilastro & Cheli, 2009
- Urophonius mondacai Ojanguren Affilastro et al., 2011
- Urophonius pizarroi Ojanguren Affilastro et al., 2010
- Urophonius somuncura Acosta, 2003
- Urophonius transandinus Acosta, 1998
- Urophonius tregualemuensis Cekalovic, 1981
- Urophonius tumbensis Cekalovic, 1981

Vachonia Abalos, 1954

- Vachonia martinezi Abalos, 1954
