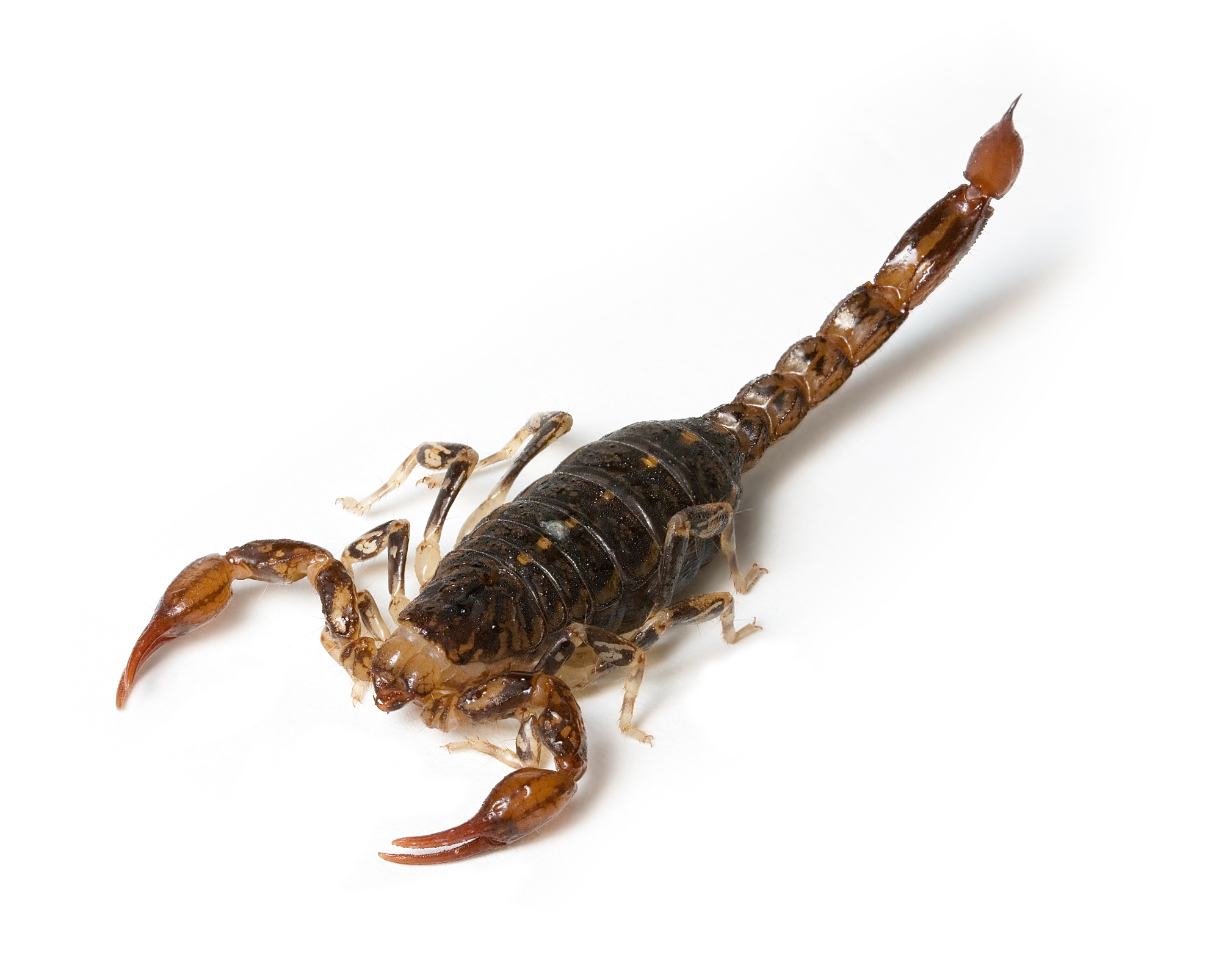
- Cercophonius squama

Scientific classification
- Kingdom: Animalia
- Phylum: Arthropoda
- Subphylum: Chelicerata
- Class: Arachnida
- Order: Scorpiones
- Family: Bothriuridae
- Genus: Cercophonius; Peters, 1861

= Cercophonius =

Genus of scorpions

Cercophonius is a genus of six species of Australian scorpions, often termed wood scorpions, in the family Bothriuridae.

== Species ==
- Cercophonius granulosus Kraepelin, 1908
- Cercophonius kershawi Glauert, 1930 - mallee wood scorpion
- Cercophonius michaelseni Kraepelin, 1908
- Cercophonius queenslandae Acosta, 1990
- Cercophonius squama (Gervais, 1843) - wood scorpion, forest scorpion
- Cercophonius sulcatus Kraepelin, 1908 - western wood scorpion
