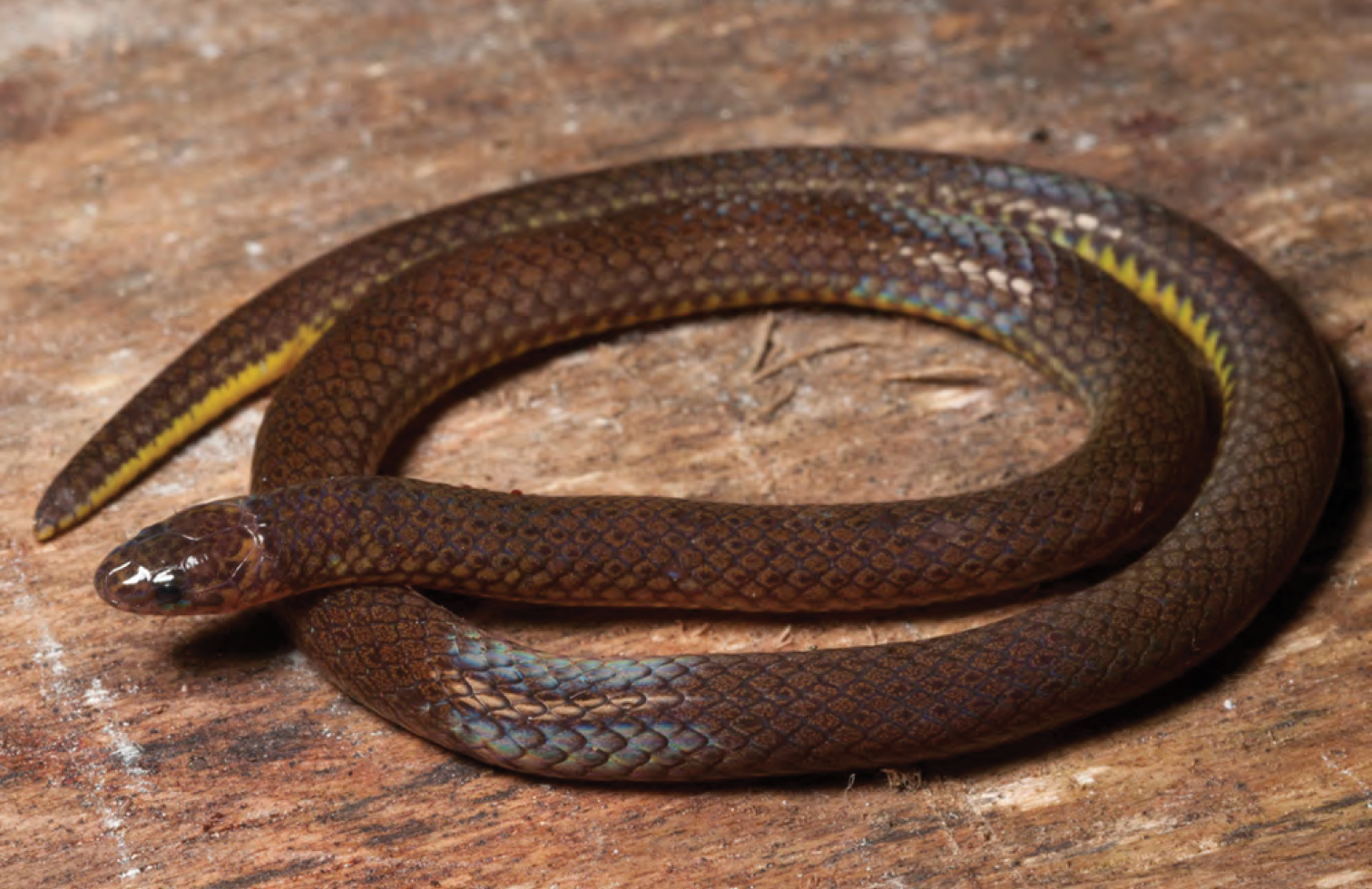

Conservation status
- Least Concern (IUCN 3.1)

Scientific classification
- Kingdom: Animalia
- Phylum: Chordata
- Class: Reptilia
- Order: Squamata
- Suborder: Serpentes
- Family: Colubridae
- Genus: Calamaria
- Species: C. gervaisii

Binomial name
- Calamaria gervaisii A.M.C. Dumeril, Bibron & A.H.A. Duméril, 1854

= Calamaria gervaisii =

Species of snake

Calamaria gervaisii, commonly known as Gervais's worm snake and the Philippine dwarf snake, is a species of small fossorial snake in the subfamily Calamariinae of the family Colubridae. The species is native to the Philippines.

== Etymology ==
The specific name, gervaisii, is in honor of French zoologist Paul Gervais.

== Geographic distribution ==
Calamaria gervaisii is endemic to the Philippine Islands. Its geographic distribution includes the islands of Basilan, Catanduanes, Cebu, Lubang, Luzon, Mindanao, Mindoro, Negros, Panay, Polillo, and Tablas.

== Habitat and behavior ==
Calamaria gervaisii is found from near sea level up to altitudes of 1,000 m (3,281 ft). It lives in forests and plantations, burrowing in the leaf litter and hiding under stones and fallen logs, or between the buttresses of trees.

== Description ==
The longest specimen of Calamaria gervaisii measured by Boulenger (1894) had a total length of 25.5 cm (10.0 in), which included a tail 2.0 cm (0.79 in) long.

== Reproduction ==
Calamaria gervaisii is oviparous.

== Conservation status ==
The IUCN has listed Calamaria gervaisii as being of "least concern" because it has a wide range, appears to be abundant with a stable population, and seems to be tolerant of disturbance to its natural habitat. No particular threats to this species have been identified.
