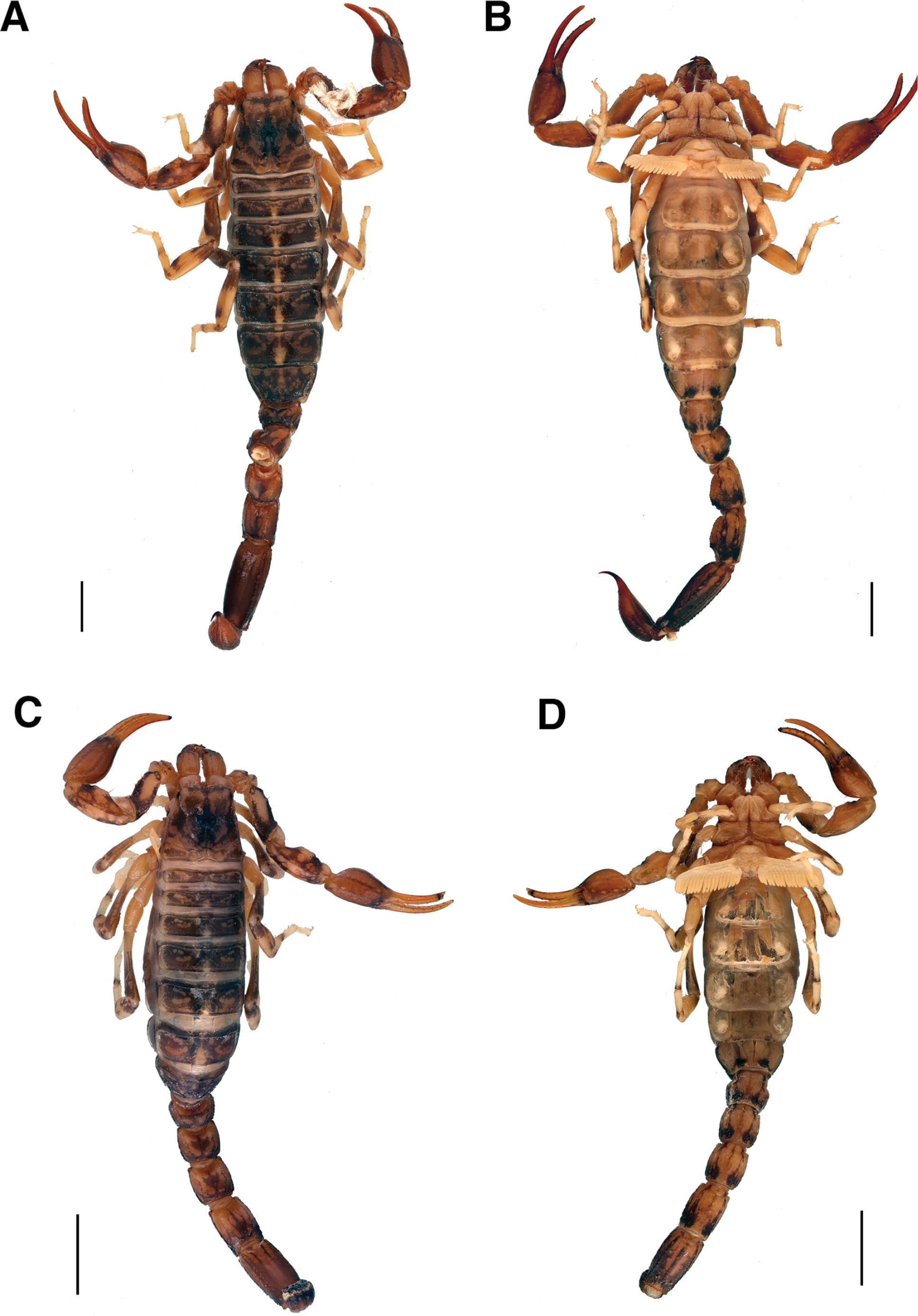

Scientific classification
- Kingdom: Animalia
- Phylum: Arthropoda
- Subphylum: Chelicerata
- Class: Arachnida
- Order: Scorpiones
- Family: Bothriuridae
- Genus: Cercophonius
- Species: C. sulcatus

Binomial name
- Cercophonius sulcatus Kraepelin, 1908

= Cercophonius sulcatus =

Species of scorpion

Cercophonius sulcatus, also known as the western wood scorpion, is a species of scorpion in the Bothriuridae family. It occurs in Western Australia, and was first described in 1908 by German naturalist Karl Kraepelin.
