= Bothriurus coriaceus =

Chilean scorpion

Scientific classification
- Kingdom: Animalia
- Phylum: Arthropoda
- Subphylum: Chelicerata
- Class: Arachnida
- Order: Scorpiones
- Family: Bothriuridae
- Genus: Bothriurus
- Species: B. coriaceus

Binomial name
- Bothriurus coriaceus Pocock, 1893

Species of scorpion

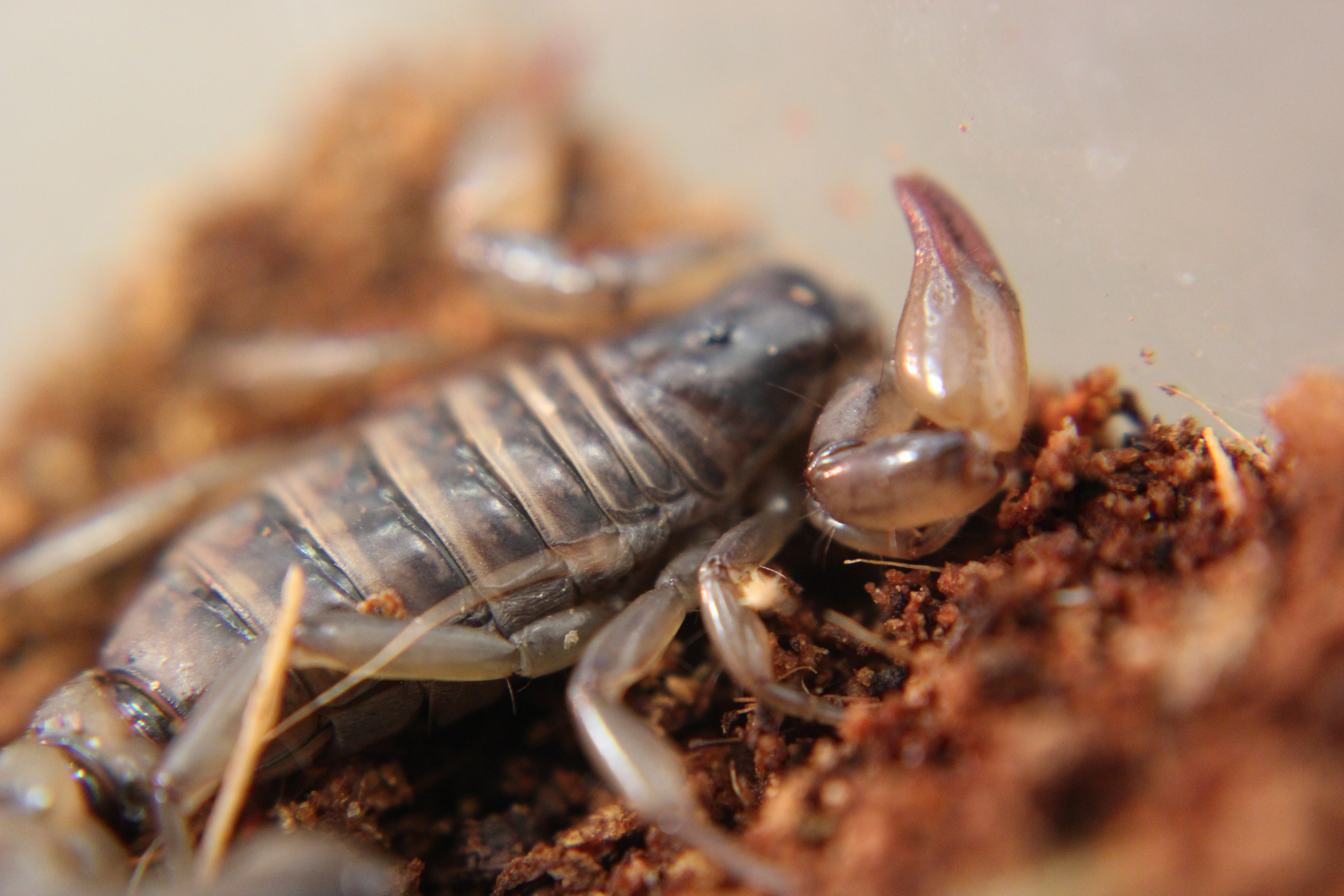
Image of Bothriurus coriaceus

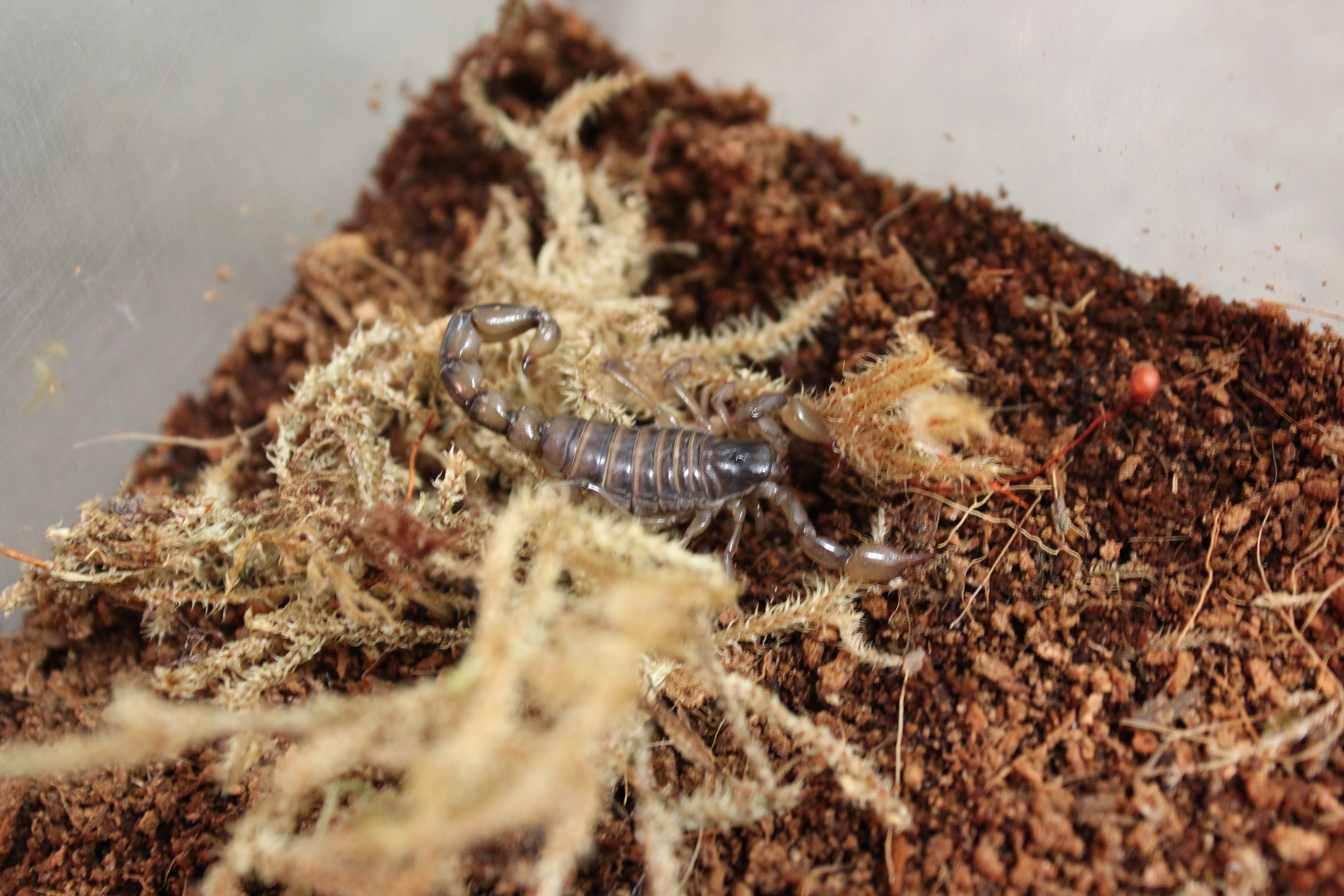
A Chilean Scorpion roaming through some moss in captivity.

Bothriurus coriaceus (Chilean scorpion) is a species of scorpion native to Chile in the Coquimbo region specifically in the northern dunes. They are not communal and are rumored to dislike the heat and will burrow deep into the ground to get cool. 20 °C - 68 °F is said to be their preferred temperature, a much cooler temperature than most scorpion species, and have actually been known to die in higher temperatures. In addition to living in lower temperatures they also prefer lower humidity than most species of scorpion.
