= Bothriurus olaen =

Scientific classification
- Domain: Eukaryota
- Kingdom: Animalia
- Phylum: Arthropoda
- Subphylum: Chelicerata
- Class: Arachnida
- Order: Scorpiones
- Family: Bothriuridae
- Genus: Bothriurus
- Species: B. olaen

Binomial name
- Bothriurus olaen Acosta, 1997

Species of scorpion

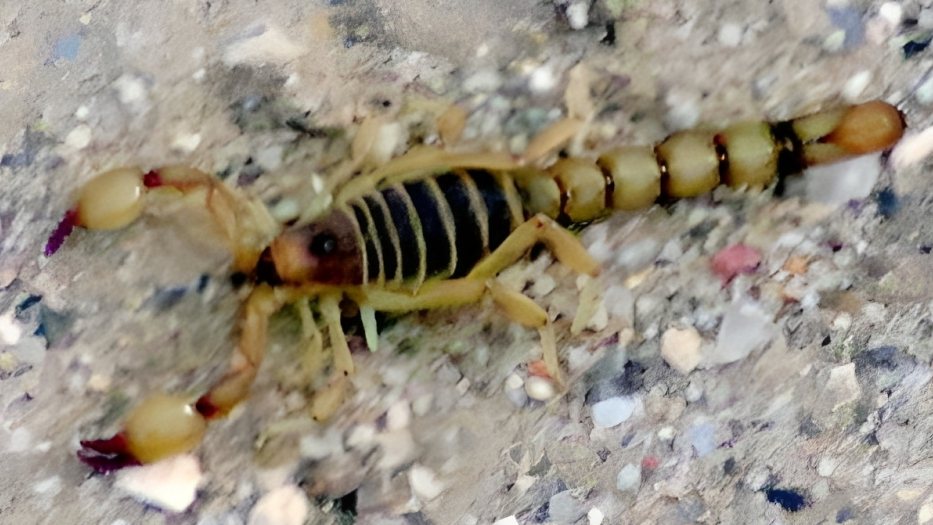
Bothriurus olaen

Bothriurus olaen is a species of scorpion from the family Bothriuridae. It lives in mountains Sierras de Córdoba and San Luis Province in central Argentina. Little is known about their habitat, most likely they are mountain dwellers, and nothing is known about their venom. The body length is about 50 millimetres (2.0 in).
