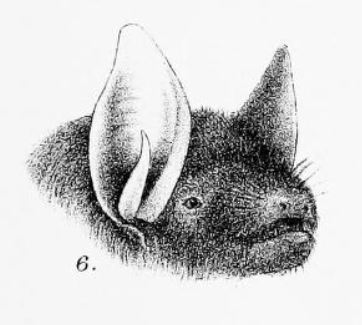

Conservation status
- Least Concern (IUCN 3.1)

Scientific classification
- Kingdom: Animalia
- Phylum: Chordata
- Class: Mammalia
- Order: Chiroptera
- Family: Vespertilionidae
- Genus: Myotis
- Species: M. levis

Binomial name
- Myotis levis Geoffroy, 1806
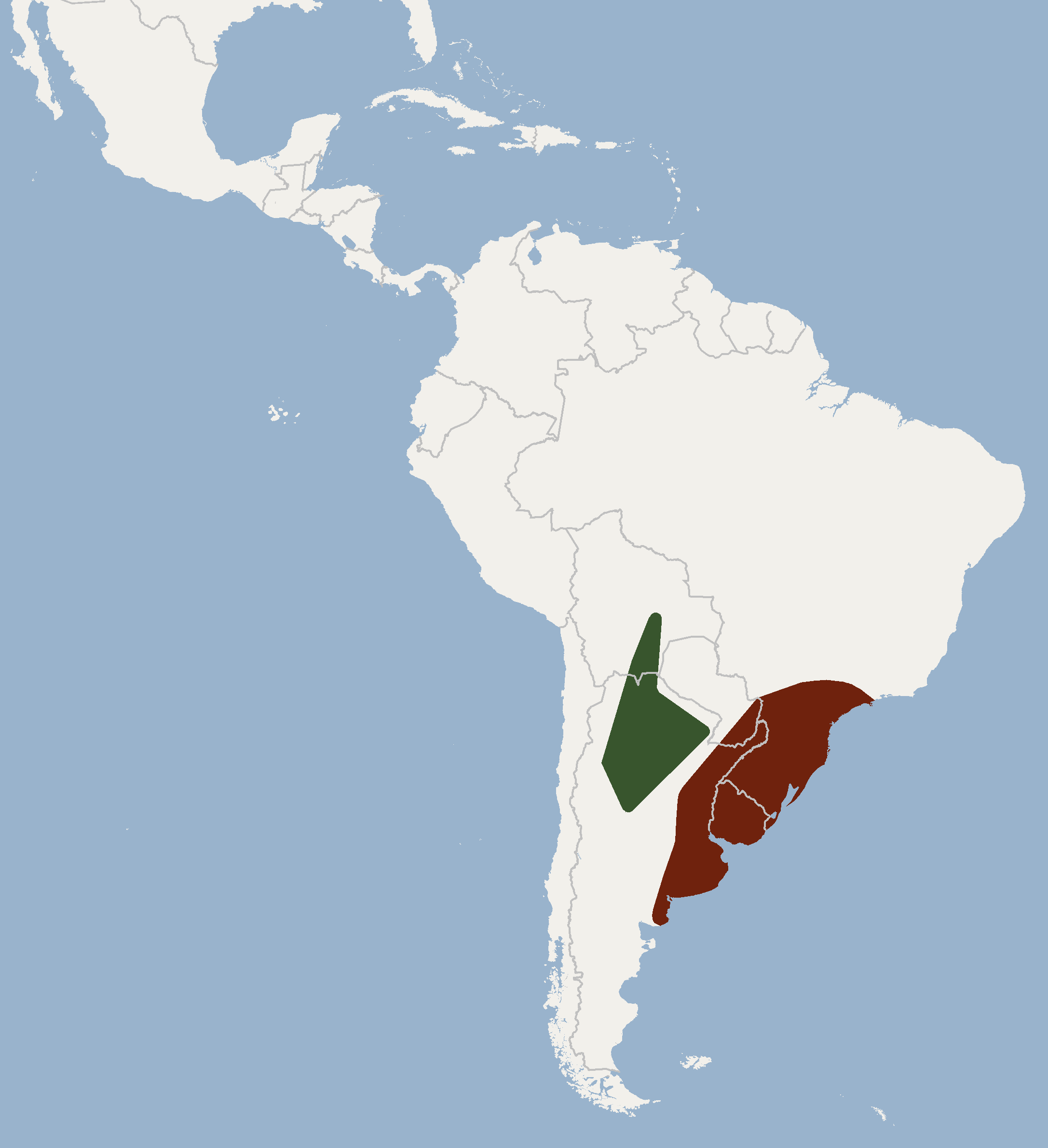
- Yellowish myotis range in red

= Yellowish myotis =

Species of bat

The yellowish myotis (Myotis levis) is a vesper bat species from South America. It is found in Argentina, Brazil, Paraguay, and Uruguay.

Dinelli's myotis (M. dinellii) was formerly considered a subspecies of M. levis, but was split as a distinct species by a 2013 study, which found significant genetic and morphological differences between both taxa.
