= Myotis diminutus =

Conservation status
- Data Deficient (IUCN 3.1)

Scientific classification
- Kingdom: Animalia
- Phylum: Chordata
- Class: Mammalia
- Order: Chiroptera
- Family: Vespertilionidae
- Genus: Myotis
- Species: M. diminutus

Binomial name
- Myotis diminutus Moratelli & Wilson, 2011

Species of bat

Myotis diminutus is a species of mouse-eared bat found in Ecuador and Colombia. It was recently described as a new species in 2011.

== Taxonomy and etymology ==
Myotis diminutus was described as a new species in 2011 by Moratelli and Wilson. The holotype was collected in February 1979 47 km (29 mi) south of Santo Domingo, Ecuador. The species name "diminutus" is Latin for "diminutive". Moratelli and Wilson selected this name because M. diminutus was the smallest species of mouse-eared bat yet described in South America.

== Description ==
Superficially, M. diminutus is similar to the black myotis in appearance. Very few individuals have ever been documented. Based on the measurements of one individual, a subadult male, individuals weigh approximately 3.5 g (0.12 oz) and have a forearm length of 33.3 mm (1.31 in). Its ears are short, at 11 mm (0.43 in) in length. It has silky, cinnamon-brown fur. Its skull lacks a sagittal crest.

== Range ==
The species was first documented in Ecuador. However, a review of museum specimens identified a second individual that had been collected in the Nariño Department of Colombia in 1959. With only two confirmed localities, its elevation range of occurrence is 150–225 m (492–738 ft) above sea level.
