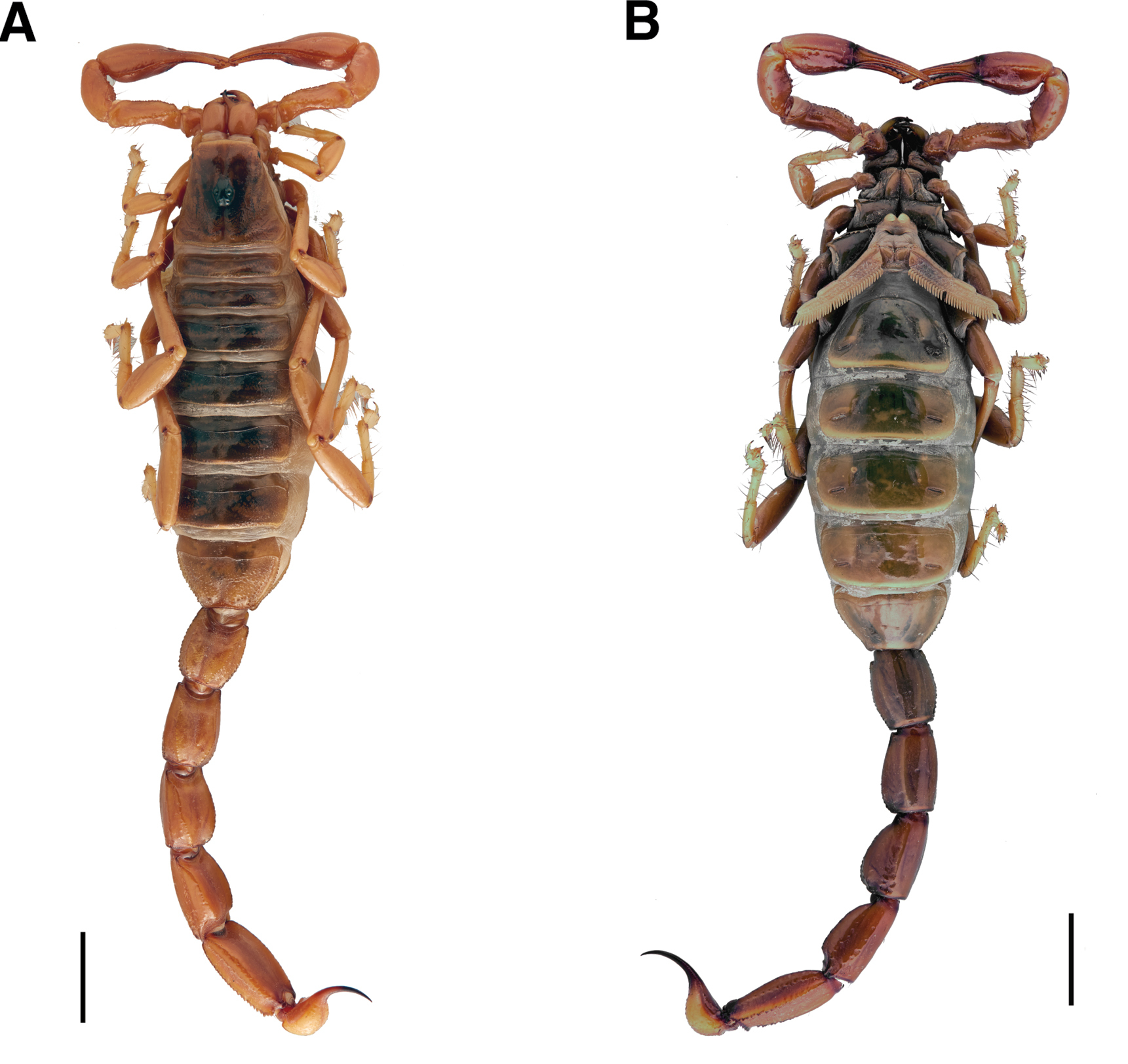

Scientific classification
- Domain: Eukaryota
- Kingdom: Animalia
- Phylum: Arthropoda
- Subphylum: Chelicerata
- Class: Arachnida
- Order: Scorpiones
- Family: Bothriuridae
- Genus: Brachistosternus
- Species: B. ehrenbergii

Binomial name
- Brachistosternus ehrenbergii Gervais 1841

= Brachistosternus ehrenbergii =

Species of scorpion

Brachistosternus ehrenbergii is a scorpion species native to Peru and Northern Chile and the most cited species in the genus Brachistosternus. The species was first described by Paul Gervais in 1841. Its venom is toxic to mice.
