= Montane myotis =

Conservation status
- Least Concern (IUCN 3.1)

Scientific classification
- Kingdom: Animalia
- Phylum: Chordata
- Class: Mammalia
- Order: Chiroptera
- Family: Vespertilionidae
- Genus: Myotis
- Species: M. oxyotus

Binomial name
- Myotis oxyotus Peters, 1867
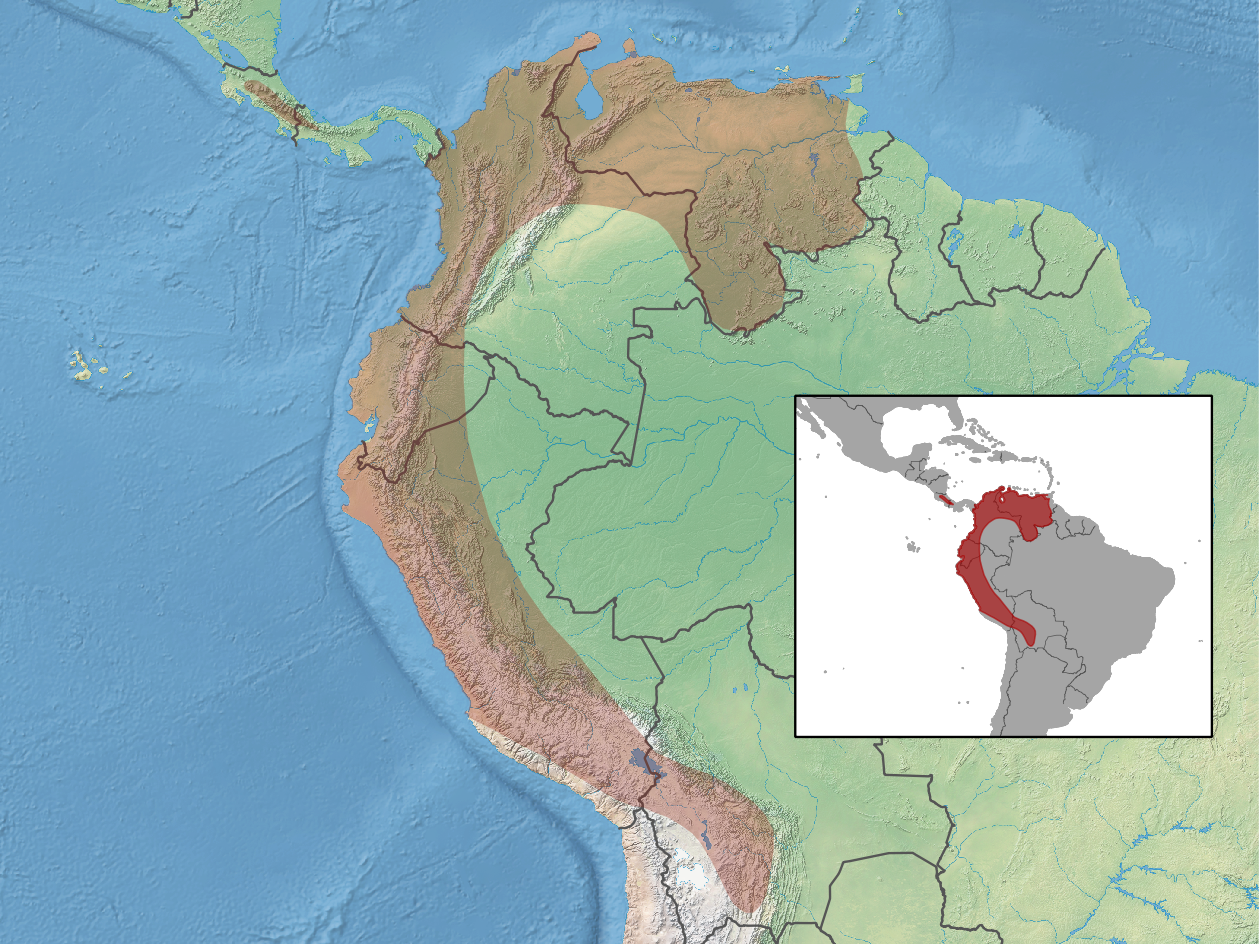

Species of bat

The montane myotis (Myotis oxyotus) is a species of vesper bat. It is found in Bolivia, Colombia, Costa Rica, Ecuador, Panama, Peru, and Venezuela.
