= Paul Gervais =

French paleontologist and entomologist (1816–1879)

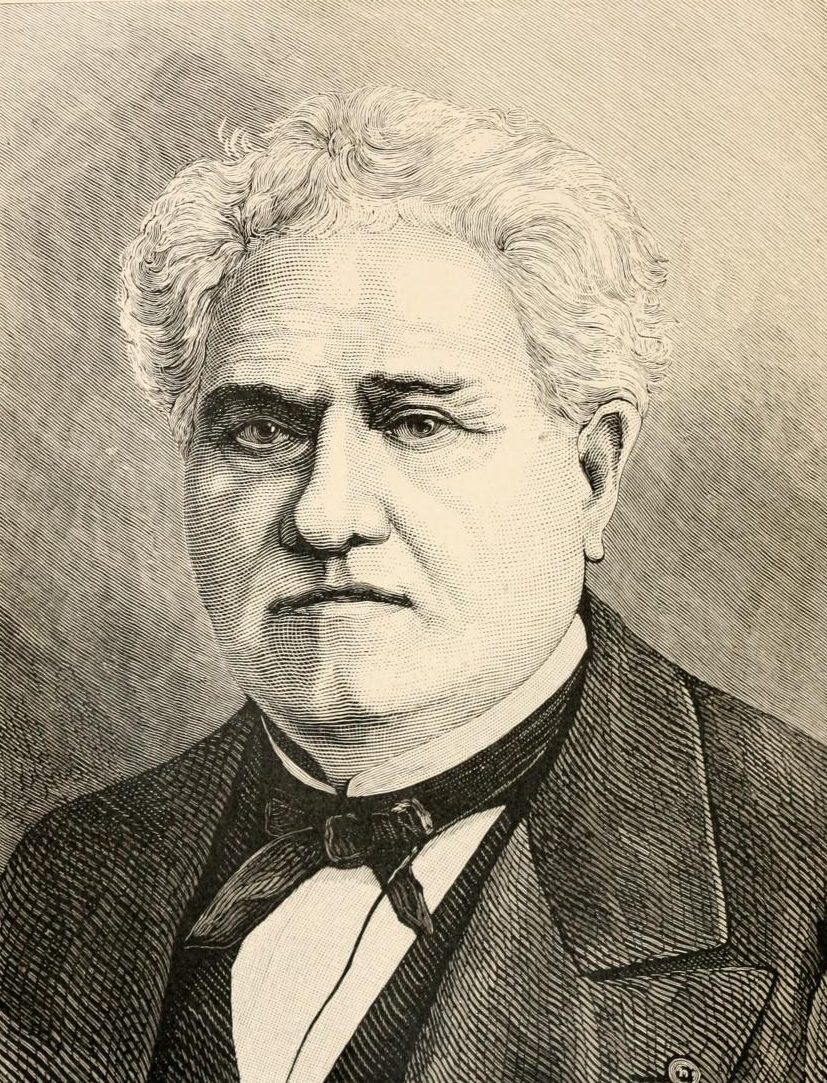
- Paul Gervais
- Born: 26 September 1816; Paris
- Died: 10 February 1879 (aged 62); Paris
- Scientific career
- Fields: palaeontology; entomology
- Workplaces: Sorbonne; Muséum national d'Histoire naturelle
- Thesis: Études pour servir à l'histoire des myriapodes (1844)
- Author abbrev. (zoology): Gervais

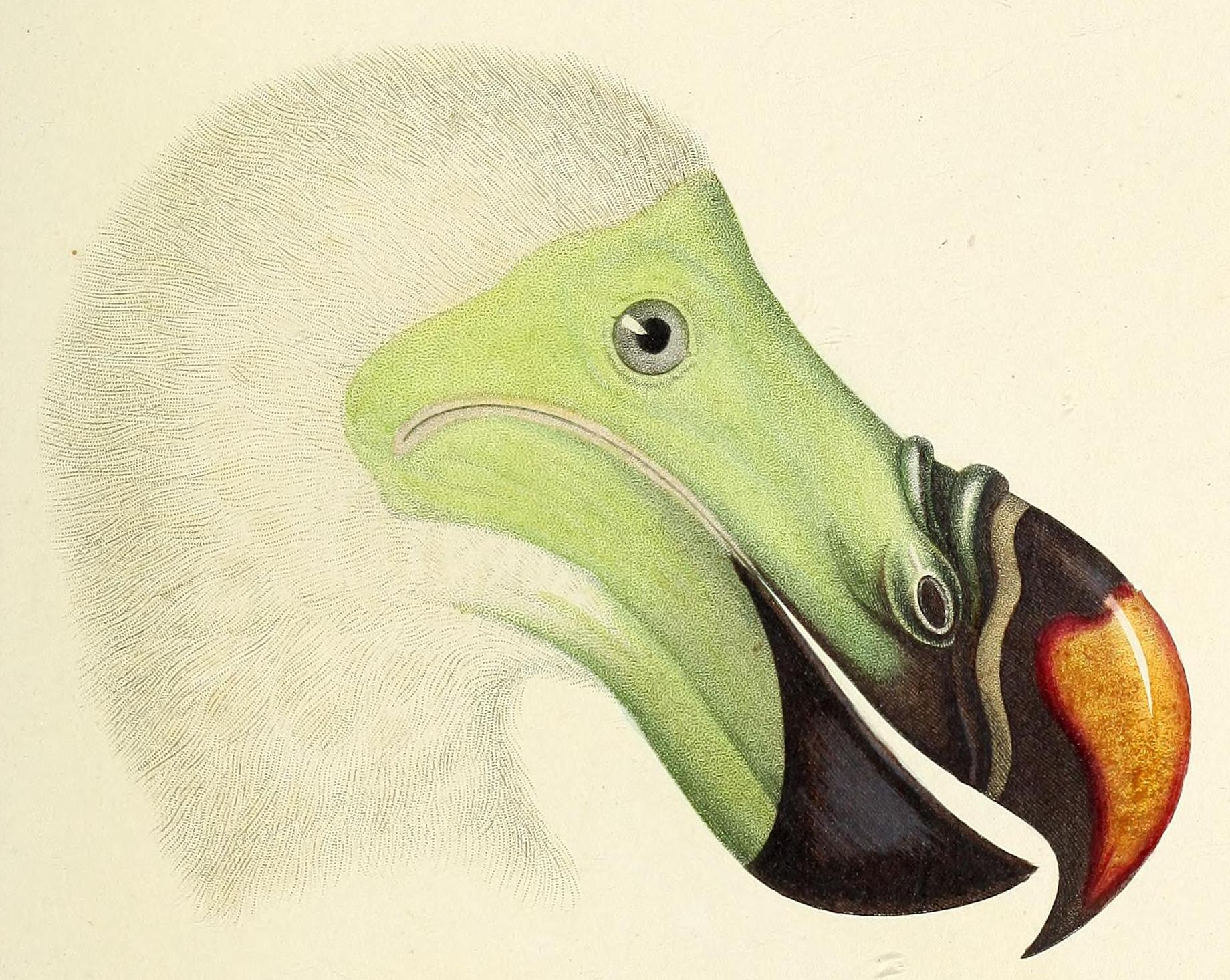
Head of a dodo, detail of illustration from Atlas de Zoologie, Paul Gervais, 1844

Paul Gervais (full name: François Louis Paul Gervais) (26 September 1816 – 10 February 1879) was a French palaeontologist and entomologist.

== Biography ==
Gervais was born in Paris, where he obtained the diplomas of doctor of science and of medicine, and in 1835 he began palaeontological research as assistant in the laboratory of comparative anatomy at the Muséum national d'Histoire naturelle. In 1841 he obtained the chair of zoology and comparative anatomy at the Faculty of Sciences in Montpellier, of which he was in 1856 appointed dean. In 1848–1852 appeared his important work Zoologie et paléontologie françaises, supplementary to the palaeontological publications of Georges Cuvier and Henri Marie Ducrotay de Blainville; of this a second and greatly improved edition was issued in 1859. In 1865 he accepted the professorship of zoology at the Sorbonne, vacant through the death of Louis Pierre Gratiolet; this post he left in 1868 for the chair of comparative anatomy at the Paris museum of natural history, the anatomical collections of which were greatly enriched by his exertions. He died in Paris on 10 February 1879.

According to Florentino Ameghino, Paul Gervais studied a fossil collection obtained from Juan Manuel de Rosas the governor of Buenos Aires. Earlier on, this collection would have been donated or donated-by-force to the Buenos Aires Province by Francisco Javier Muñiz.

== Legacy ==
Gervais is commemorated in the vernacular and scientific names of the following taxa:

- a species of snake, Calamaria gervaisii.
- a species of cetacean, Gervais' beaked whale (Mesoplodon europaeus).

== Works ==
Apart from the works mentioned previously he also wrote:

- with Charles Athanase Walckenaer Histoire naturelle des insectes (4 vols., 1836–1847)
- Zoologie et paléontologie françaises (1848–1852)
- Histoire naturelle des Mammifères (1853)
- Zoologie médicale (1859), mit Pierre-Joseph van Beneden
- Recherches sur l'ancienneté de l'homme et la période quaternaire (1867)
- Zoologie et Paléontologie générales (1867)
- Ostéographie des cétacés vivants et fossiles (1869), with Pierre-Joseph van Beneden

== Species first described by Gervais ==
- Brachistosternus ehrenbergii
- Gervais' beaked whale (Mesoplodon europaeus)

== See also ==
- Category:Taxa named by Paul Gervais
