= List of scorpions of Australia =

This is a list of scorpion species that occur in Australia:

== Buthidae ==
- Australobuthus xerolimniorum
- Hemilychas alexandrinus
- Isometroides angusticaudus
- Isometroides vescus
- Isometrus maculatus
- Isometrus melanodactylus
- Lychas buchari
- Lychas jonesae
- Lychas marmoreus
- Lychas mjobergi
- Lychas spinatus
- Lychas variatus

== Bothriuridae ==
- Cercophonius granulosus
- Cercophonius kershawi
- Cercophonius michaelseni
- Cercophonius queenslandae
- Cercophonius squama
- Cercophonius sulcatus

== Hormuridae ==
- Hormurus ischnoryctes
- Hormurus karschii
- Hormurus longimanus
- Hormurus macrochela
- Hormurus ochyroscapter
- Hormurus polisorum
- Hormurus waigiensis
- Liocheles australasiae

== Urodacidae ==
- Aops oncodactylus
- Urodacus armatus
- Urodacus butleri
- Urodacus carinatus
- Urodacus centralis
- Urodacus elongatus
- Urodacus excellens
- Urodacus giulianii
- Urodacus hartmeyeri
- Urodacus hoplurus
- Urodacus koolanensis
- Urodacus lowei
- Urodacus macrurus
- Urodacus manicatus
- Urodacus mckenziei
- Urodacus megamastigus
- Urodacus novaehollandiae
- Urodacus planimanus
- Urodacus similis
- Urodacus spinatus
- Urodacus varians
- Urodacus yaschenkoi
