= Monster Bug Wars =

Documentary

- Genre: Documentary
- Narrated by: Henry Strozier; Paul Willis (Australia)
- Countries of origin: Australia; United States
- Original language: English
- No. of seasons: 2
- No. of episodes: 12 (+2)

Production
- Running time: 44 minutes; 48 minutes (Australia)

Original release
- Network: Science Channel
- Release: March 29, 2011 – February 28, 2012

Monster Bug Wars is a nature documentary program, created and distributed by Beyond Television Productions, and televised on the Science Channel in the United States, and SBS in Australia. The monster movie format features two kinds of insects, arachnids, myriapods, and other invertebrates in gladiator style combat in a simulated natural environment. In intermittent breaks, entomologists educate the viewer about the strengths and weaknesses of the dueling arthropods.

The opening narration is "In nature's fight pit, a host of ruthless bugs as bizarre as they are lethal slug it out in real-life battles to the death. Witness epic encounters between swarms of marauding assassins, and vicious one-on-one clashes where only one bug survives. The world of monster bugs is a jungle, where there's just one law: eat or be eaten."

== Premise ==
The program highlights The Law of the Jungle involving two arthropods of different species, both usually being carnivorous. They are shown fighting to the death with the victor devouring the victim in graphic detail. The program is noted for its use of dramatic theme music and unusual sound editing—during combat, the sounds of growling, screaming, war cries, and shrieks of agony, to name but a few, are heard. In addition, other military and ringside sound effects such as bells, bugles, whistles and alarms are occasionally added. Of course, none of these sounds are natural and are only added to enhance the dramatic effect. However, some viewers have stated these sound effects are silly and do nothing but make a good documentary program into something rather comical. It has been noted that season two has much less sound effects than season one. Despite the odd sound effects, the invertebrate specialists managing the animals for the series took great care to ensure all the interactions were those between species that naturally interact and prey upon one another in the wild. This was the result of hundreds of hours of field observation and years of experience with the various species. Like the vast majority of macro productions, this was filmed in a studio situation to allow for controlled lighting and camera operation. It utilized large natural sets which enabled the animals to behave as they would in nature. Between shots of the fight, the two entomologist hosts of the program narrate the action. Dr. Linda Rayor of Cornell University and Associate Professor Dr. Bryan Grieg Fry of University of Queensland describe each arthropod's abilities that give it an advantage over the other. The entomologists often try to predict the winner of the two. The program is narrated by Henry Strozier.

In Australia, the program began airing on SBS on November 14, 2012. It features re-voiced narration by Dr. Paul Willis of RIAUS, as well as a longer running time due to additional narrated footage. Eden began airing the series on February 29, 2016 in the United Kingdom.

== Production ==
The series premiered in 2009. The first season started in 2011 and had a run of six episodes. The series was renewed for 2012 with another six episodes produced.

== Episodes ==
=== Series overview ===
Season	Episodes	Originally released	
Season	Episodes	First released	Last released
Pilot		October 7, 2009	
1	6	March 29, 2011	May 3, 2011
2	6	January 24, 2012	February 28, 2012
Special		July 2012	

In the following episode listings, winners are in bold.

=== Pilot (2009) ===
No. overall	Title	Original release date
1	"Pilot"	October 7, 2009
Rounds: 1. – King cricket vs. **Centipede**; 2. – Saint Andrew Cross Spider vs. **Portia spider** 3. – **Desert scorpion** vs. Wolf spider 4. – **Redback Spider** vs. Huntsman spider 5. – **Tiger beetle** vs. Raspy cricket 6. – **Giant rainforest mantis** vs. Spiky katydid 7. – Bull ant vs. **Black ant**

=== Season 1 (2011) ===
No. overall	No. in season	Title	Original release date
2	1	"Death at Midnight"	March 29, 2011
Rounds: 1. – **Giant rainforest mantis** vs. Spiny leaf insect 2. – Bull ant vs. **Redback spider** 3. – **Water spider** vs. Water strider 4. – **White-tailed spider** vs. Black house spider 5. – **Sydney funnel-web spider** vs. Garden wolf spider
3	2	"Enemy Empire"	April 5, 2011
Rounds: 1. – Tree scorpion vs. **Green ants** 2. – **Cellar spider** vs. White-tailed spider 3. – Trap-jaw ant vs. **Antlion**; 4. – **Brown house spider** vs. Redback spider 5. – **Desert centipede** vs. Desert trapdoor spider
4	3	"Quick and the Deadly"	April 12, 2011
Rounds: 1. – **Ogre-faced spider** vs. Assassin bug 2. – **Bulldog raspy cricket** vs. Whistling tarantula 3. – **House centipede** vs. Swift tree mantis 4. – Marbled scorpion vs. **Trap-jaw ants** 5. – Metallic green jumping spider vs. **Spitting spider**
5	4	"Shape-Shifters"	April 19, 2011
Rounds: 1. – **Lichen huntsman spider** vs. Grey tree runner mantis 2. – **Tent spider** vs. Destructive katydid 3. – Rhinoceros beetle vs. **Meat ants** 4. – **Green jumping spider** vs. Long-jawed jumping spider 5. – **Giant banded huntsman spider** vs. Jungle huntsman spider
6	5	"When Tribes Go To War"	April 26, 2011
Rounds: 1. – Green ants vs. **Paper wasps** 2. – **Portia spider** vs. Long-jawed orb weaver 3. – Balloon-winged katydid vs. **Tree centipede** 4. – Badge huntsman spider vs. **Spider hunting scorpion** 5. – **Tiger leech** vs. Freshwater crab
7	6	"Rainforest Rampage"	May 3, 2011
Rounds: 1. – **Jumping jack ant** vs. Green-bellied huntsman spider 2. – Green praying mantis vs. **Predatory katydid** 3. – Spiny tree cricket vs. **Golden orb-weaver** 4. – **Desert centipede** vs. Desert scorpion 5. – **Bee killer assassin bug** vs. Earwig

=== Season 2 (2012) ===
No. overall	No. in season	Title	Original release date
8	1	"Deadly Duels"	January 24, 2012
Rounds: 1. – Jungle tiger beetle vs. **Moss mantis** 2. – **Horned katydid** vs. Owl butterfly (caterpillar); 3. – **Ogre-faced spider** vs. Army ant (Soldier); 4. – Red-thighed wandering spider vs. **Black-tailed Scorpion**; 5. – Longicorn beetle vs. **Flame bellied orb-weaver**
9	2	"Blood on the Forest Floor"	January 31, 2012
Rounds: 1. – Hooded mantis vs. **Brazilian wandering spider** 2. – Rainforest land crab vs. **Army ant** 3. – Harvestman vs. **Velvetworm**; 4. – **Black jungle stalker** vs. Black faced katydid 5. – Amblypygid vs. **Red forest scorpion**
10	3	"Ultra Violence"	February 7, 2012
Rounds: 1. – Giant cockroach vs. **Mexican red-rump tarantula** 2. – Stripe-tailed centipede vs. **Vinegaroon**; 3. – **Banana spider** vs. Orange horned katydid 4. – Golden carpenter ant vs. **Flag-tailed assassin bug** 5. – Slender necked mantis vs. **Bronzed huntsman spider**
11	4	"Mother of All Wars"	February 14, 2012
Rounds: 1. – **Black-tailed scorpion (baby)** vs. Pirate spider 2. – **Lichen bark mantis** vs. Rock spider 3. – Bug-eyed katydid vs. **Candy-cane katydid** 4. – **Rufus comb-footed spider** vs. Spitting spider 5. – Tiger assassin bug vs. **Silverback cross spider**
12	5	"Murderous Intent"	February 21, 2012
Rounds: 1. – **Speckled house spider** vs. Leafcutter ant (soldier); 2. – **Tiger jumping spider** vs. Yellow jumping spider 3. – Geophilid centipede vs. **Costa Rican cellar spider** 4. – **Orange-mouthed tarantula** vs. Red Mouth Conehead katydid 5. – Dinosaur ants vs. **Trap-jaw ants**
13	6	"Super Slayers"	February 28, 2012
Rounds: 1. – **Leaf-tailed mantis** vs. Sunburst raspy cricket 2. – Spiny orb-weaver vs. **Crab spider** 3. – **Water bug** vs. Mudeye; 4. – Domino beetle vs. **Crimson-legged assassin bug** 5. – Mangrove tree crab vs. **Leopard spider**

=== Special (2012) ===
Monster Bug Wars Top 10 is a second season compilation episode released in July 2012. This episode included 10 already released bug fights that have been shortened. The following battles are listed below:

No. overall	Title	Original release date
14	"Monster Bug Wars Top 10"	July 2012
Rounds: 10. – Slender necked mantis vs. **Bronzed huntsman spider**; 9. – **Tiger beetle** vs. Raspy cricket; 8. – Green ant vs. **Paper wasp**; 7. – **Tiger leeches** vs.Freshwater crab; 6. – Trap-jaw ant vs. **Antlion**; 5. – Assassin bug vs. **Ogre-faced spider**; 4. – **Desert centipede** vs. Desert trapdoor spider; 3. – **Giant rainforest mantis** vs. Spiny leaf insect; 2. – **Green jumping spider** vs. Long-jawed jumping spider; 1. – Tree scorpion vs. **Green ant**
