= Macrurus =

Macrurus, meaning long-tailed, may refer to:

- Dapalis macrurus, extinct species of prehistoric ray-finned fish in the family Ambassidae
- Elusor macrurus, (Mary River turtle), species of turtle in the family Chelidae
- Limnocalanus macrurus, species of crustacean belonging to the family Centropagidae
- Megarhyssa macrurus, the long-tailed giant ichneumon wasp, a wasp in the family Ichneumonidae
- Oligodon macrurus, (Angel's kukri snake), a species of snake in the family Colubridae
- Pseudomonacanthus macrurus (strap-weed filefish), species of filefish in the family Monacanthidae
- Urodacus macrurus, species of scorpion in the family Urodacidae
