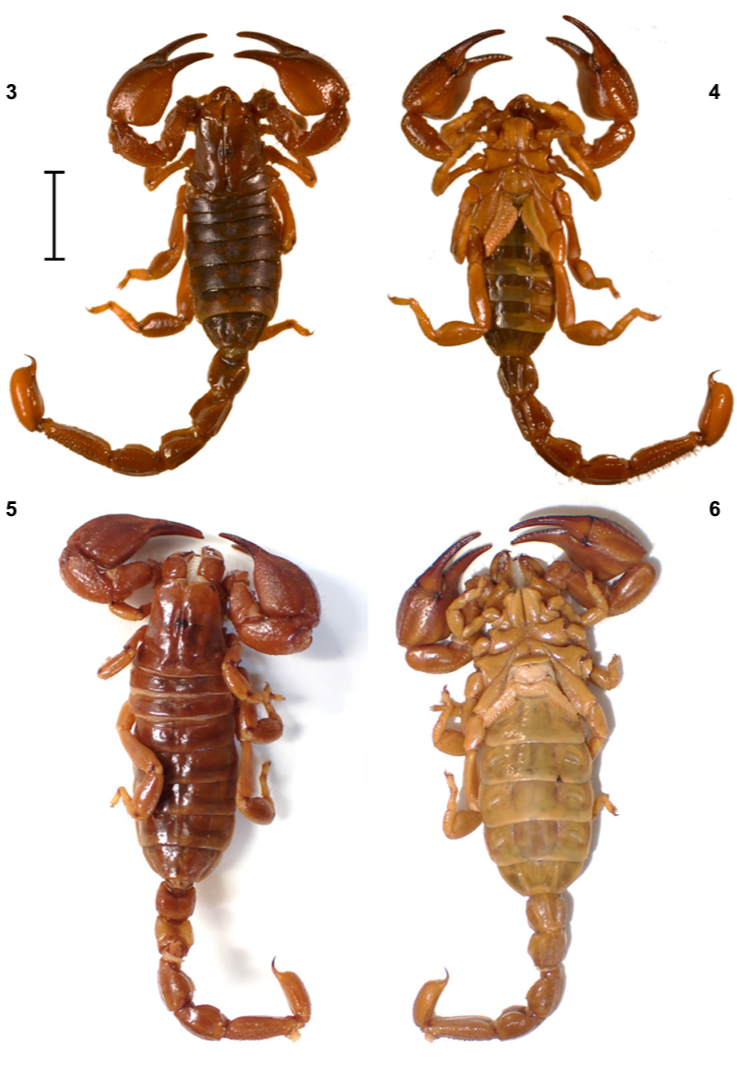
- Top = male (holotype) Bottom = female Scale bar = 1 cm (0.4 in)

Scientific classification
- Kingdom: Animalia
- Phylum: Arthropoda
- Subphylum: Chelicerata
- Class: Arachnida
- Order: Scorpiones
- Family: Urodacidae
- Genus: Urodacus
- Species: U. uncinus

Binomial name
- Urodacus uncinus Buzatto et al., 2023
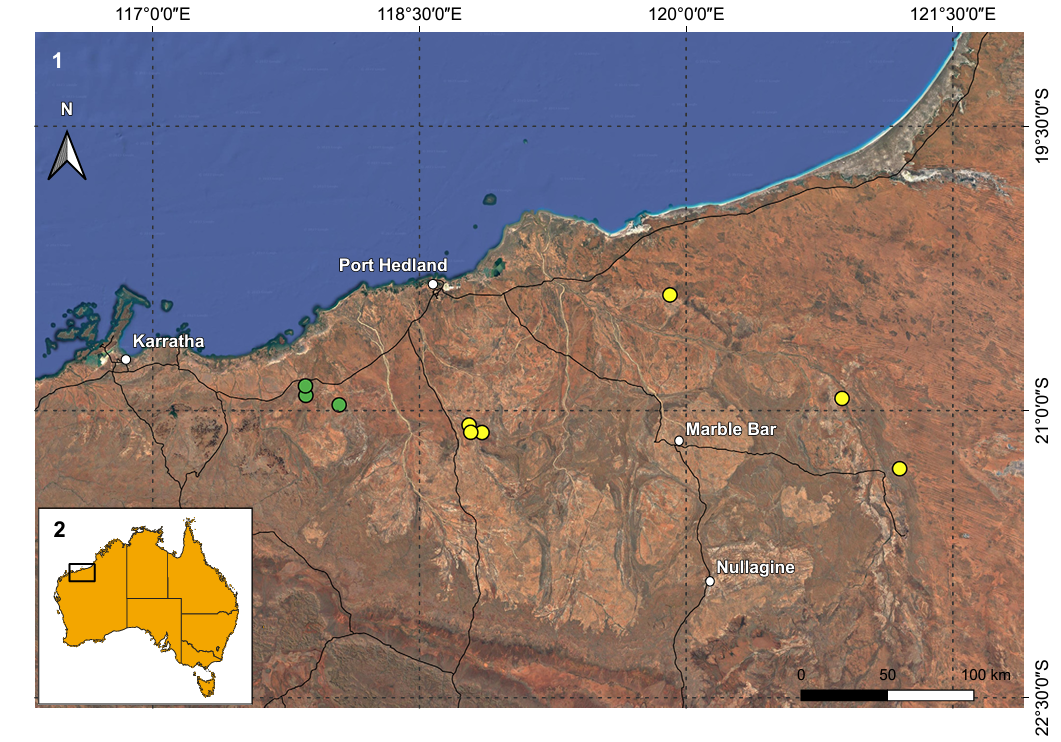
- Urodacus uncinus is represented by yellow circles, U. lunatus is represented by green circles

= Urodacus uncinus =

Species of scorpion

Urodacus uncinus is a species of scorpion in the family Urodacidae. It is endemic to the northern part of Western Australia.

== Description ==
Urodacus uncinus is morphologically indistinguishable from U. lunatus and examination of the male genitalia is required.

== Distribution and ecology ==
Urodacus uncinus is rare and is only known from 6 locations and 16 specimens in north-eastern Pilbara. It is known to occur in an area of around 12,000 km^{2} (4,633 sq mi). This number may not be accurate because of its potentially patchy distribution. That means the area may be under 10,000 km^{2} (3,861 sq mi). Species with such distributions are considered short-range endemic.

Due to certain morphological features, it is thought to live a fossorial lifestyle. They may only live in creeks and drainage lines.

== Etymology ==
The specific epithet "uncinus" comes from Latin and means "hook". This refers to the aculeus (sting) that is more strongly curved than what is usually seen in the genus.
