= Mopsolodes =

Scientific classification
- Kingdom: Animalia
- Phylum: Arthropoda
- Subphylum: Chelicerata
- Class: Arachnida
- Order: Araneae
- Infraorder: Araneomorphae
- Family: Salticidae
- Subfamily: Salticinae
- Genus: Mopsolodes; Zabka, 1991

Type species
- M. australensis Zabka, 1991

Species
- M. australensis Zabka, 1991 – New Guinea, Australia (Northern Territory, Queensland); M. furculosus Gardzińska, 2012 – New Guinea

Genus of spiders

Mopsolodes is a genus of South Pacific jumping spiders that was first described by Marek Michał Żabka in 1991. As of July 2019 it contains only two species, found only in Australia and Papua New Guinea: M. australensis and M. furculosus. The name is derived from the closely related genus Mopsus.
