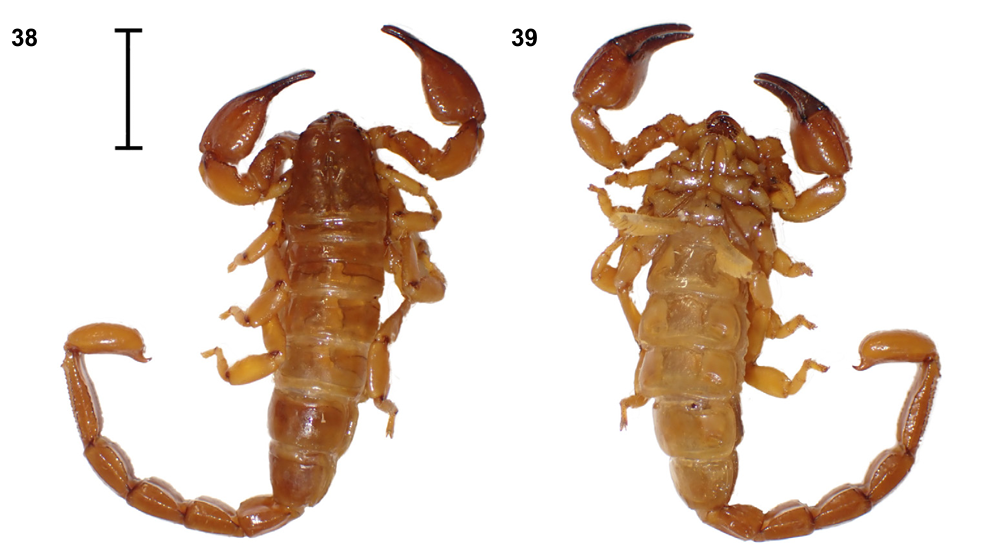
- Holotype ♂ Scale bar = 1 cm (0.4 in)

Scientific classification
- Kingdom: Animalia
- Phylum: Arthropoda
- Subphylum: Chelicerata
- Class: Arachnida
- Order: Scorpiones
- Family: Urodacidae
- Genus: Urodacus
- Species: U. lunatus

Binomial name
- Urodacus lunatus Buzatto et al., 2023
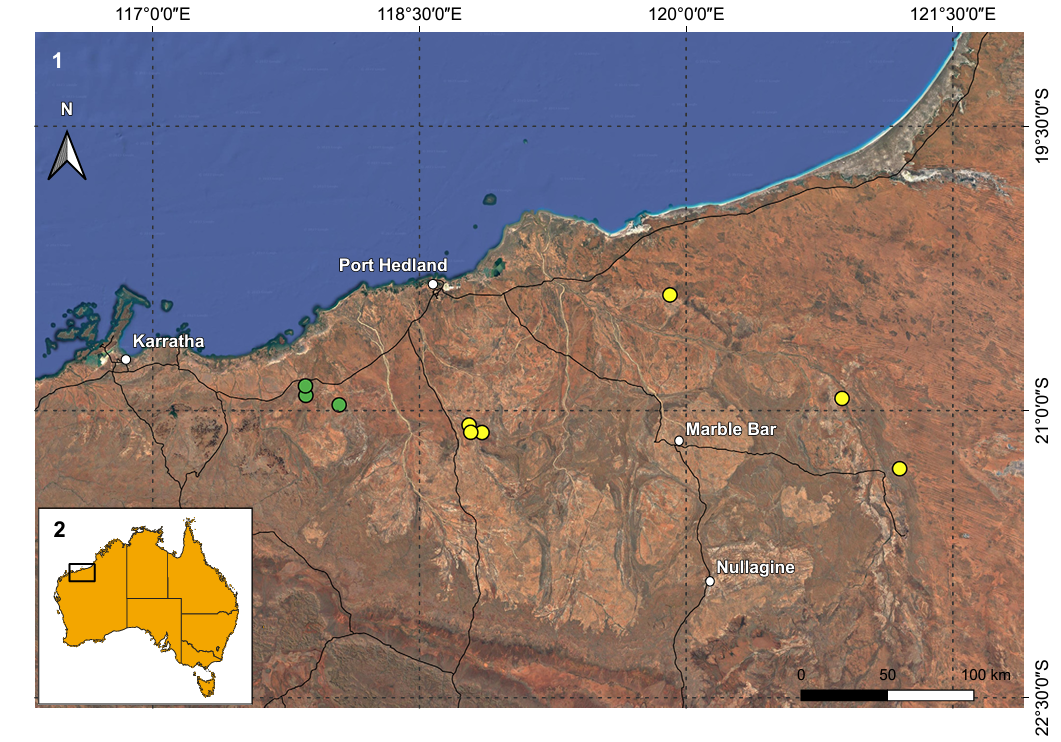
- Urodacus lunatus is only shown by green circles

= Urodacus lunatus =

Species of scorpion

Urodacus lunatus is a rare species of burrowing scorpion in the family Urodacidae. It is endemic to the northern part of western Australia and was described in 2023.

== Description ==
Urodacus lunatus cannot be distinguished from Urodacus uncinus with external morphology and examination of genitalia is required.

== Distribution and ecology ==
The species is known from nine specimens from three locations in Pilbara shown by the green circles on the range map. These locations only make up around 50 km^{2} (20 mi^{2}), which means it is a short-range endemic species, as it is likely distributed in under 10,000 km^{2} (3860 mi^{2}).

It is likely fossorial but this is based on the similar species U. uncinus. It is hypothesized that the males travel longer distances to mate, as this is common in the genus.

== Etymology ==
The specific epithet "lunatus" refers to the crescent or lunate shape of the laminar hook in the hemispermatophore, a part of the genitalia.

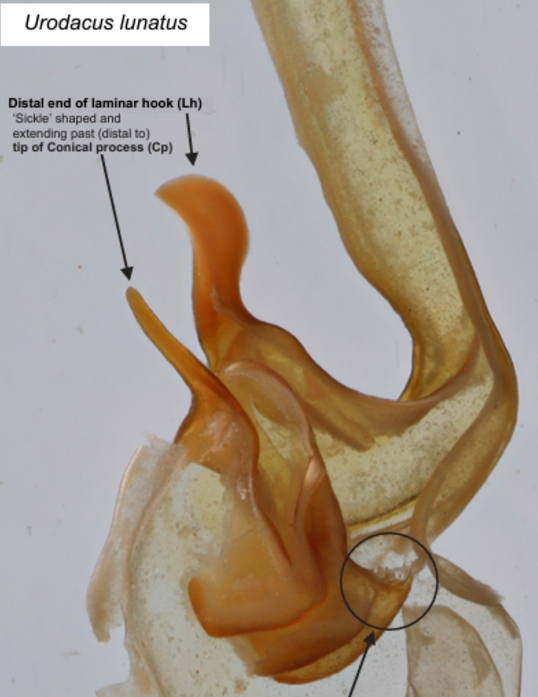
Shape of the laminar hook (Lh)
