= Urodacus varians =

Scientific classification
- Kingdom: Animalia
- Phylum: Arthropoda
- Subphylum: Chelicerata
- Class: Arachnida
- Order: Scorpiones
- Family: Urodacidae
- Genus: Urodacus
- Species: U. varians

Binomial name
- Urodacus varians Glauert, 1963

Species of scorpion

Urodacus varians is a species of scorpion in the Urodacidae family. It is endemic to Australia, and was first described in 1963 by Australian paleontologist and Western Australian Museum curator Ludwig Glauert.

== Description ==
The holotype is 84 mm (3.3 in) in length. Colouration is mainly light clay yellow.

== Distribution and habitat ==
The species occurs in Western Australia. The type locality is the Canning Stock Route; it has also been recorded near Onslow in the Pilbara region.
