= Urodacus megamastigus =

Scientific classification
- Kingdom: Animalia
- Phylum: Arthropoda
- Subphylum: Chelicerata
- Class: Arachnida
- Order: Scorpiones
- Family: Urodacidae
- Genus: Urodacus
- Species: U. megamastigus

Binomial name
- Urodacus megamastigus L.E.Koch, 1977

Species of scorpion

Urodacus megamastigus is a species of scorpion in the Urodacidae family. It is endemic to Australia, and was first described in 1977 by L. E. Koch.

== Description ==
The holotype is 75 mm in length. Colouration is mainly clay yellow, brownish on the legs.

== Distribution and habitat ==
The species occurs in western Western Australia.
