= Urodacus giulianii =

Scientific classification
- Kingdom: Animalia
- Phylum: Arthropoda
- Subphylum: Chelicerata
- Class: Arachnida
- Order: Scorpiones
- Family: Urodacidae
- Genus: Urodacus
- Species: U. giulianii

Binomial name
- Urodacus giulianii L.E.Koch, 1977

Species of scorpion

Urodacus giulianii is a species of scorpion in the Urodacidae family. It is endemic to Australia, and was first described in 1977 by L. E. Koch.

== Description ==
The holotype is 55 mm in length. Colouration is orange-brown to dark brown.

== Distribution and habitat ==
The species occurs in arid central Australia – the southern Northern Territory, north-western South Australia and eastern Western Australia.

== Behaviour ==
The scorpions dig deep spiral burrows in open ground.
