= Urodacus carinatus =

Scientific classification
- Kingdom: Animalia
- Phylum: Arthropoda
- Subphylum: Chelicerata
- Class: Arachnida
- Order: Scorpiones
- Family: Urodacidae
- Genus: Urodacus
- Species: U. carinatus

Binomial name
- Urodacus carinatus Hirst, 1911

Synonyms
- Urodacus hoplurus carinatus Hirst, 1911

Species of scorpion

Urodacus carinatus is a species of scorpion in the Urodacidae family. It is native to central Australia, and was first described in 1911 by British arachnologist Arthur Stanley Hirst.
