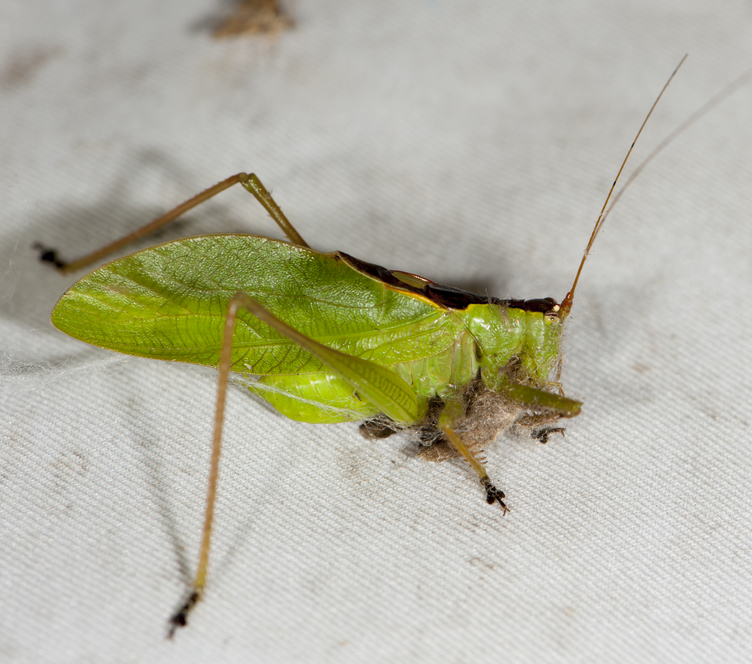
- Hexacentrus unicolor

Scientific classification
- Domain: Eukaryota
- Kingdom: Animalia
- Phylum: Arthropoda
- Class: Insecta
- Order: Orthoptera
- Suborder: Ensifera
- Family: Tettigoniidae
- Subfamily: Hexacentrinae; Karny, 1925

Synonyms
- Hexacentrini Karny, 1912

= Hexacentrinae =

Subfamily of cricket-like animals

The Hexacentrinae, are a subfamily of predatory bush crickets or katydids. The type genus is Hexacentrus, which may be known as "balloon-winged" bush crickets/katydids etc., is also the most speciose and widespread in Africa and Asia.

== Description ==
The group has sometimes been treated as a tribe (as "Hexacentrini") within Conocephalinae, which may be a sister group.

A.V. Gorochov described the following characters for this subfamily:

- rostrum of head narrow with simple, moderately long mandibles, without distinct sexual dimorphism;
- flat, wide hind lobe of the pronotum with thoracic sternites having a pair of spines or finger-like processes;
- fore and middle legs have tibiae with long spines, especially on the ventral surface (for predation);
- hind wings (if not shortened) with developed “costal lobe”, and a characteristic thickened crossvein;
- anal plate and epiproct rather simple (no distinct specializations) in both sexes, but male paraprocts have a finger-like process or distinct lobule at their apex.

== Genera and Distribution ==
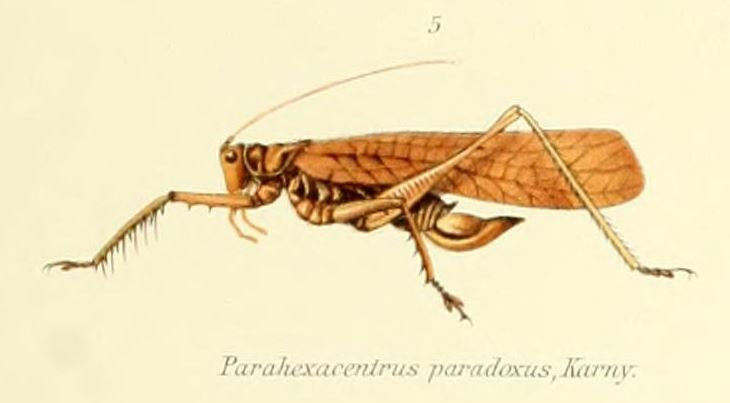
Parahexacentrus paradoxus

As of July 2022, the Orthoptera Species File lists the following tribes and genera:

=== South American tribes ===
Genera have been placed in two tribes, mostly from Ecuador.

Ecuanedubini Braun, Chamorro-Rengifo & Morris, 2009

1. Acanthoraculus Braun & Morris, 2009 (1 species)
2. Ecuaneduba Gorochov, 2006 (3 spp.)

Nubimystrigini Braun, 2016

1. Nubimystrix Braun, 2016 (2 sp.)

=== Unplaced genera ===
1. Aerotegmina Hemp, 2001 (4 spp. E Africa)
2. Alison Rentz, 2001 (4 spp. Australia, New Guinea)
3. Euhexacentrus Hebard, 1922 (1 sp. Philippines)
4. Glenophisis Karny, 1926 (5 spp. Malesia)
5. Hexacentrus Serville, 1831 (28 spp. Africa, SE Asia)
6. Nepheliphila Hugel, 2010 (1 sp. Indian Ocean)
7. Parahexacentrus Karny, 1912 (1 sp. New Guinea)
8. Parateuthras Bolívar, 1905 (2 spp. New Guinea)
9. Philippicentrus Willemse, 1961 (1 sp. Philippines)
10. Teuthroides Bolívar, 1905 (1 sp. New Guinea)
