= Urodacus mckenziei =

Scientific classification
- Kingdom: Animalia
- Phylum: Arthropoda
- Subphylum: Chelicerata
- Class: Arachnida
- Order: Scorpiones
- Family: Urodacidae
- Genus: Urodacus
- Species: U. mckenziei

Binomial name
- Urodacus mckenziei Volschenk, Smith & Harvey, 2000

Species of scorpion

Urodacus mckenziei is a species of scorpion in the Urodacidae family. It is endemic to Australia, and was first described in 2000 by Erich Volschenk, Graeme Smith and Mark Harvey.

== Etymology ==
The species epithet mckenziei honours Norman I. McKenzie for contributions to knowledge of Australian biogeography.

== Description ==
Colouration is mainly reddish-yellow, with some darker areas.

== Distribution and habitat ==
The species is known only from the Carnarvon region of Western Australia.
