= Urodacus excellens =

Scientific classification
- Kingdom: Animalia
- Phylum: Arthropoda
- Subphylum: Chelicerata
- Class: Arachnida
- Order: Scorpiones
- Family: Urodacidae
- Genus: Urodacus
- Species: U. excellens

Binomial name
- Urodacus excellens Pocock, 1888

Synonyms
- Iodacus darwinii Pocock, 1891

Species of scorpion

Urodacus excellens is a species of scorpion in the Urodacidae family. It is endemic to Australia, and was first described in 1888 by British zoologist Reginald Innes Pocock.

== Distribution and habitat ==
The species occurs in the tropical Top End of the Northern Territory.
