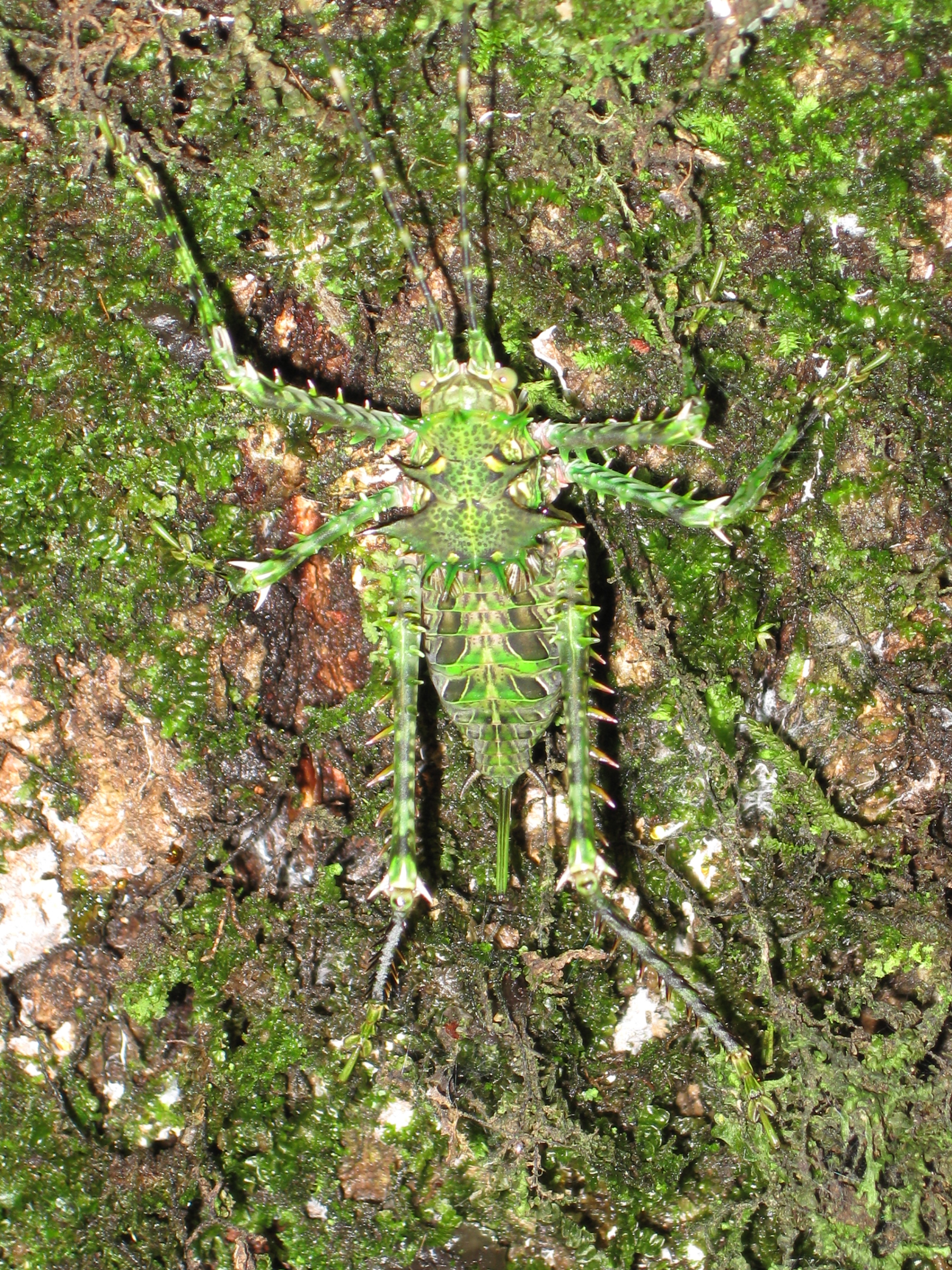
- Spiny rainforest katydid, Phricta aberrans

Scientific classification
- Domain: Eukaryota
- Kingdom: Animalia
- Phylum: Arthropoda
- Class: Insecta
- Order: Orthoptera
- Suborder: Ensifera
- Family: Tettigoniidae
- Subfamily: Pseudophyllinae
- Supertribe: Pseudophylliti
- Tribe: Phrictini; Bolívar, 1903
- Genus: Phricta; Redtenbacher, 1892

= Phricta =

Genus of cricket-like animals

Phricta is a genus of insects in the family Tettigoniidae confined to seasonal tropical forests of eastern Australia. It contains the following species:

- Phricta aberrans
- Phricta spinosa
- Phricta tortuwallina
- Phricta zwicka
