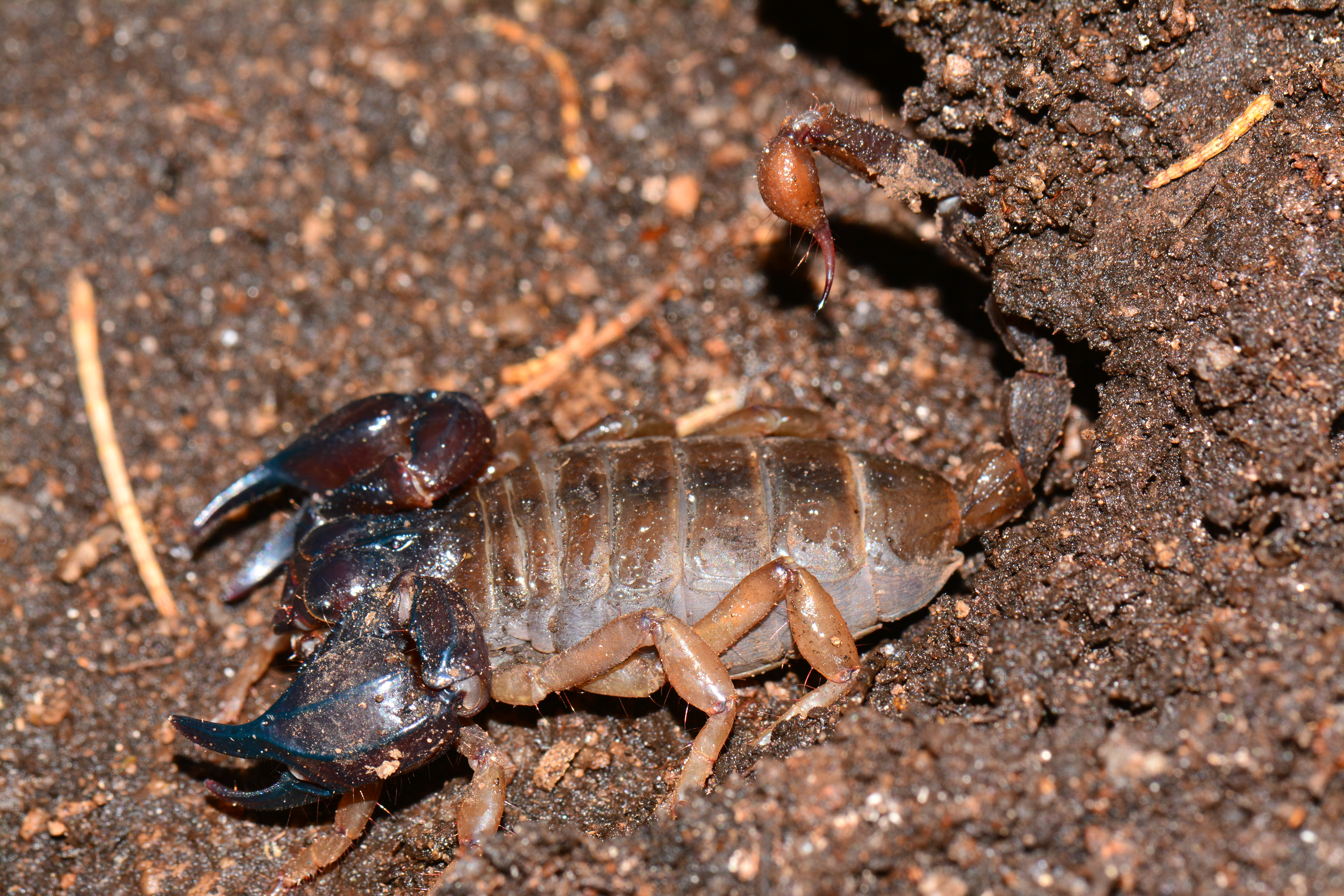

Scientific classification
- Kingdom: Animalia
- Phylum: Arthropoda
- Subphylum: Chelicerata
- Class: Arachnida
- Order: Scorpiones
- Family: Urodacidae
- Genus: Urodacus
- Species: U. planimanus

Binomial name
- Urodacus planimanus Pocock, 1893

= Urodacus planimanus =

Species of scorpion

Urodacus planimanus is a species of scorpion in the Urodacidae family. It is endemic to Australia, and was first described in 1893 by British zoologist Reginald Innes Pocock.

== Distribution and habitat ==
The species occurs in south-west Western Australia.
