= Urodacus centralis =

Scientific classification
- Kingdom: Animalia
- Phylum: Arthropoda
- Subphylum: Chelicerata
- Class: Arachnida
- Order: Scorpiones
- Family: Urodacidae
- Genus: Urodacus
- Species: U. centralis

Binomial name
- Urodacus centralis L.E.Koch, 1977

Species of scorpion

Urodacus centralis is a species of scorpion in the Urodacidae family. It has a limited range in central Australia, and was first described in 1977.

== Description ==
The species grows to about 105–115 mm in length. Colouration is variable, often dark reddish-brown, with legs and tail paler yellowish-brown.
