= Urodacus spinatus =

Scientific classification
- Kingdom: Animalia
- Phylum: Arthropoda
- Subphylum: Chelicerata
- Class: Arachnida
- Order: Scorpiones
- Family: Urodacidae
- Genus: Urodacus
- Species: U. spinatus

Binomial name
- Urodacus spinatus Pocock, 1902

Synonyms
- Urodacus simplex Pocock, 1902; Urodacus subarmatus Pocock, 1902

Species of scorpion

Urodacus spinatus is a species of scorpion in the Urodacidae family. It is endemic to Australia, and was first described in 1902 by British zoologist Reginald Innes Pocock.

== Description ==
The species grows to 80–100 mm in length. Colouration is mainly yellow-brown to reddish-brown, with yellowish arms and legs. The male's tail is longer than that of the female.

== Distribution and habitat ==
The species occurs in Queensland.

== Behaviour ==
The scorpions dig spiral burrows up to 1 m deep in hard sandy soils.
