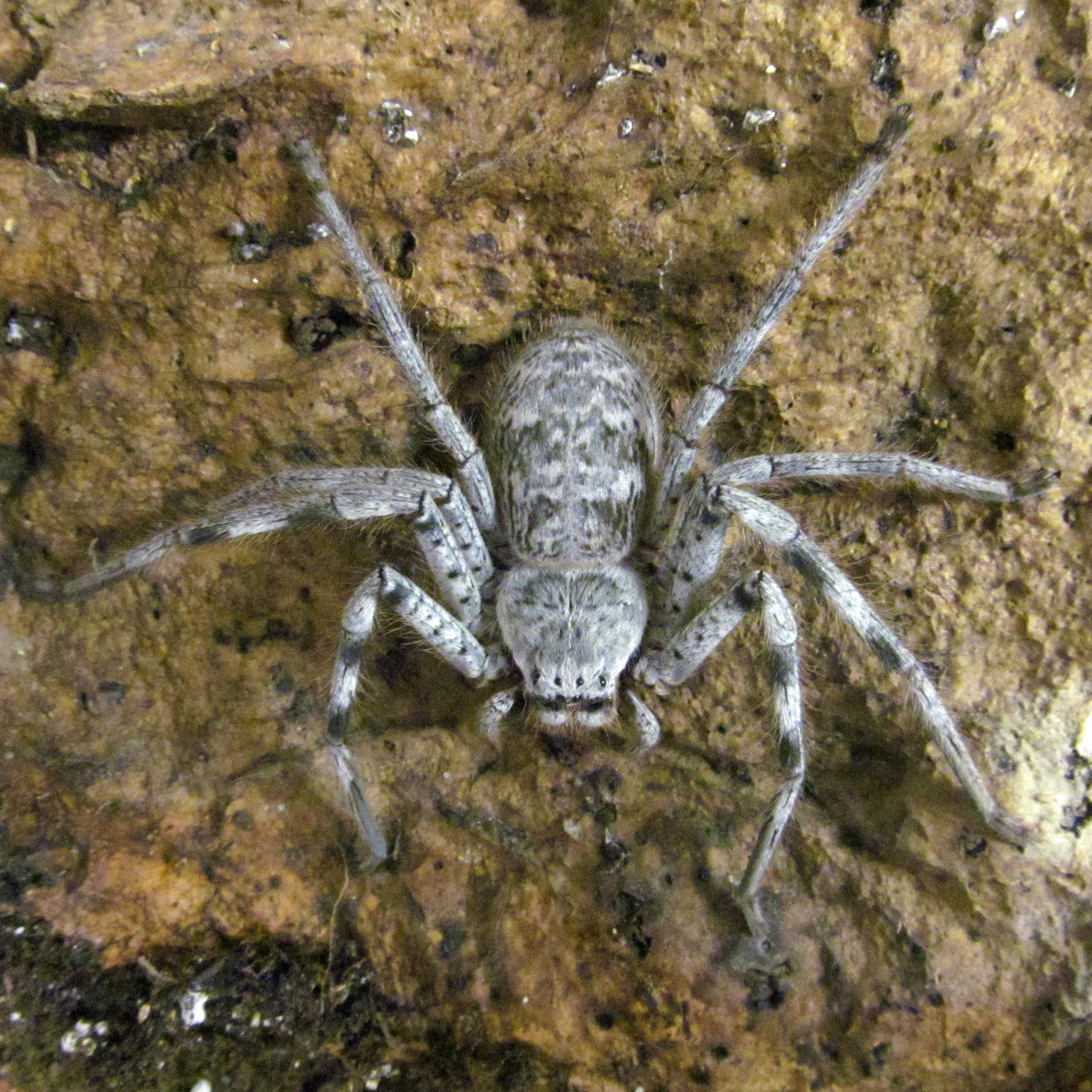
- Holconia hirsuta, female

Scientific classification
- Kingdom: Animalia
- Phylum: Arthropoda
- Subphylum: Chelicerata
- Class: Arachnida
- Order: Araneae
- Infraorder: Araneomorphae
- Family: Sparassidae
- Genus: Holconia; Thorell, 1877

Type species
- H. insignis (T. D. Thorell, 1870)

Species
- 9, see text

= Holconia =

Genus of spiders

Holconia is a genus of Southern Pacific huntsman spiders that was first described by Tamerlan Dahls Thorell in 1877. It was branched from Isopeda in 1990.

== List of species ==
As of September 2019, it contains nine species that are found widespread in Western Australia:

- Holconia colberti Hirst, 1991 – Australia (Victoria), Colbert's huntsman
- Holconia flindersi Hirst, 1991 – Australia (South Australia, Victoria, New South Wales), Flinders's banded huntsman
- Holconia hirsuta (Ludwig Koch, 1875) – Australia (Queensland), northern banded huntsman
- Holconia immanis (Ludwig Koch, 1867) – Australia, banded huntsman
- Holconia insignis (T. D. Thorell, 1870) (type) – Australia (Queensland, New South Wales), giant huntsman
- Holconia murrayensis Hirst, 1991 – Australia (South Australia, Victoria, New South Wales), Murray banded huntsman
- Holconia neglecta Hirst, 1991 – Australia (Western Australia, Northern Territory), Neglecta's banded huntsman
- Holconia nigrigularis (Simon, 1908) – Australia, giant gray huntsman
- Holconia westralia Hirst, 1991 – Australia (Western Australia), West Australia banded huntsman
