= Isometroides =

Scientific classification
- Kingdom: Animalia
- Phylum: Arthropoda
- Subphylum: Chelicerata
- Class: Arachnida
- Order: Scorpiones
- Superfamily: Buthoidea
- Family: Buthidae
- Genus: Isometroides; Keyserling, 1885

Genus of scorpion

Isometroides is a genus of scorpions in the Buthidae family with two species. It is endemic to, and found widely across, inland mainland Australia, and was first described by German arachnologist Eugen von Keyserling in 1885.

== Species ==
- Isometroides vescus (Karsch, 1880)
- Isometroides angusticaudus Keyserling, 1885

The genus has sometimes been considered monotypic, with I. angusticaudus a synonym of I. vescus.

== Distribution and habitat ==
Found across much of inland Australia, the scorpions occur in woodland and semi-arid country.

== Behaviour ==
The scorpions are specialised predators of burrowing spiders.
