= Isometroides angusticaudus =

Scientific classification
- Kingdom: Animalia
- Phylum: Arthropoda
- Subphylum: Chelicerata
- Class: Arachnida
- Order: Scorpiones
- Family: Buthidae
- Genus: Isometroides
- Species: I. angusticaudus

Binomial name
- Isometroides angusticaudus Keyserling, 1885

Species of scorpion

Isometroides angusticaudus, also known as the slender spider-hunting scorpion, is a species of scorpion in the Buthidae family. It is native to Australia, and was first described by German arachnologist Eugen von Keyserling in 1885.

== Description ==
This species grows to about 30 mm in length, smaller than the otherwise very similar I. vescus, with which it was once synonymised.

== Distribution and habitat ==
The species has been recorded from South Australia, New South Wales and Victoria.

== Behaviour ==
The scorpions are specialised nocturnal predators of trapdoor spiders, and are often found in the vacant burrows of their prey.
