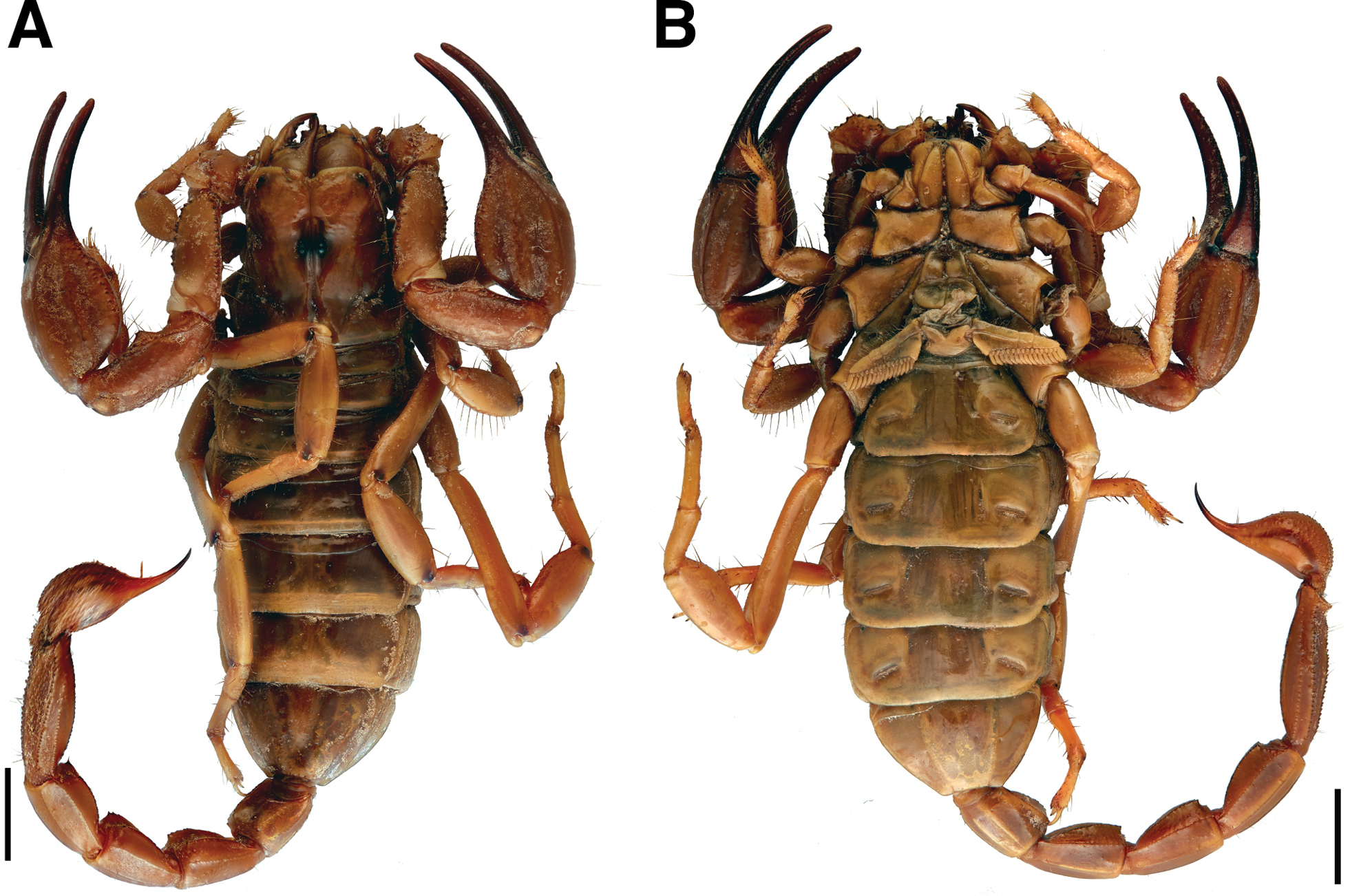
- Female lectotype: dorsal (A) and ventral (B) views

Scientific classification
- Kingdom: Animalia
- Phylum: Arthropoda
- Subphylum: Chelicerata
- Class: Arachnida
- Order: Scorpiones
- Family: Urodacidae
- Genus: Urodacus
- Species: U. hartmeyeri

Binomial name
- Urodacus hartmeyeri Kraepelin, 1908

= Urodacus hartmeyeri =

Species of scorpion

Urodacus hartmeyeri is a species of scorpion in the Urodacidae family. It is endemic to Australia, and was first described in 1908 by German naturalist Karl Kraepelin.

== Description ==
The species grows to about 100 mm in length. Colouration is mainly clay yellow.

== Distribution and habitat ==
The species occurs in Western Australia along the west coast and coastal plain, from North West Cape southwards to Hamel.
