= Urodacus hoplurus =

Scientific classification
- Kingdom: Animalia
- Phylum: Arthropoda
- Subphylum: Chelicerata
- Class: Arachnida
- Order: Scorpiones
- Family: Urodacidae
- Genus: Urodacus
- Species: U. hoplurus

Binomial name
- Urodacus hoplurus Pocock, 1898

Synonyms
- Urodacus hillieri Hirst, 1911

Species of scorpion

Urodacus hoplurus is a species of scorpion in the Urodacidae family. It is endemic to Australia, and was first described in 1898 by British zoologist Reginald Innes Pocock.

== Distribution and habitat ==
The species can be found in much of the western part of the continent, including the Northern Territory, South Australia and Western Australia.
