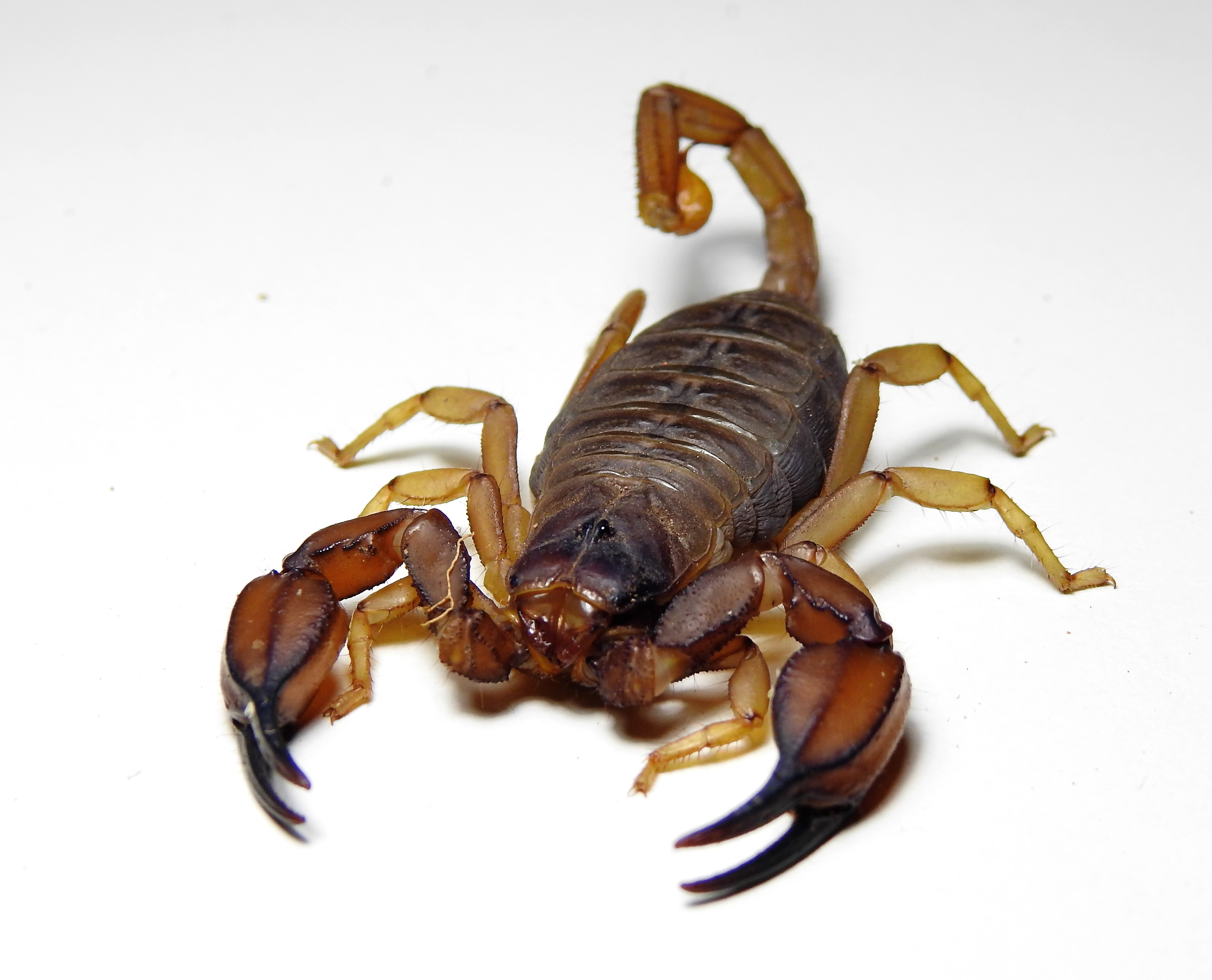

Scientific classification
- Kingdom: Animalia
- Phylum: Arthropoda
- Subphylum: Chelicerata
- Class: Arachnida
- Order: Scorpiones
- Family: Urodacidae
- Genus: Urodacus
- Species: U. elongatus

Binomial name
- Urodacus elongatus L.E. Koch, 1977

= Urodacus elongatus =

Species of scorpion

Urodacus elongatus, commonly known as the Flinders Range scorpion, is a species of scorpion belonging to the family Urodacidae. They are endemic to the Flinders Ranges of South Australia. They were described by L.E. Koch in 1977.

== Description ==
Flinders Range scorpions are sexually dimorphic. The males are generally slimmer but overall larger with longer tail segments, which is where they get their specific name elongatus. Females are generally smaller than the males but more robust with shorter tail segments. They are one of the largest species of scorpion in Australia, with males growing up to 12cm from mouth to tip of stinger and females up to 10cm. They can live up to 8-12 years in the wild or in captivity. In the wild they live in shallow scrapes constructed under rocks.

== In culture ==
They are commonly sold in specialty pet shops and are sought after due to their large size in comparison to other commercially available scorpions. They are an observational pet and are not intended to be handled as they will inflict a painful venomous sting when threatened. However no known scorpion species in Australia possesses a venom which is fatal to humans, and the Flinders Range scorpion is no exception. Stings from this species do not usually require medical attention.
