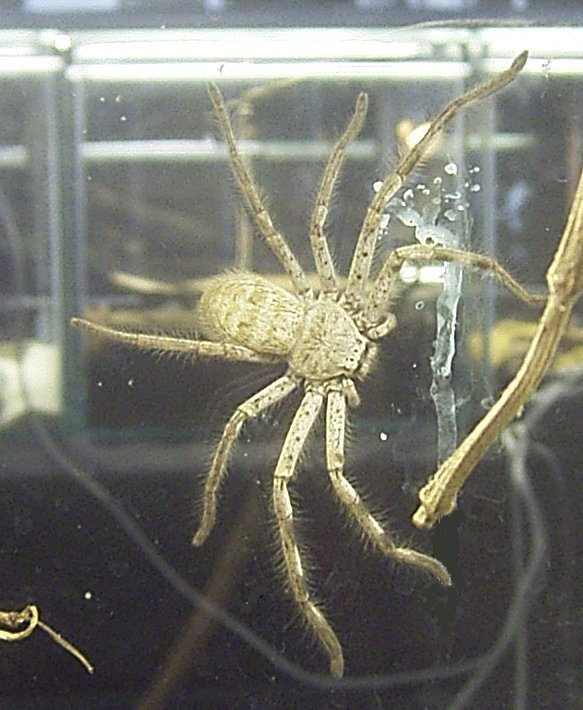

Scientific classification
- Kingdom: Animalia
- Phylum: Arthropoda
- Subphylum: Chelicerata
- Class: Arachnida
- Order: Araneae
- Infraorder: Araneomorphae
- Family: Sparassidae
- Genus: Holconia
- Species: H. insignis

Binomial name
- Holconia insignis Thorell, 1870

Synonyms
- Isopeda insignis L. Koch, 1875; Voconia insignis Hogg, 1903

= Holconia insignis =

Species of spider

Holconia insignis is a species of huntsman spider found in Queensland and New South Wales, Australia. It is the type species for the genus Holconia, and was first described by Tamerlan Thorell in 1870.
