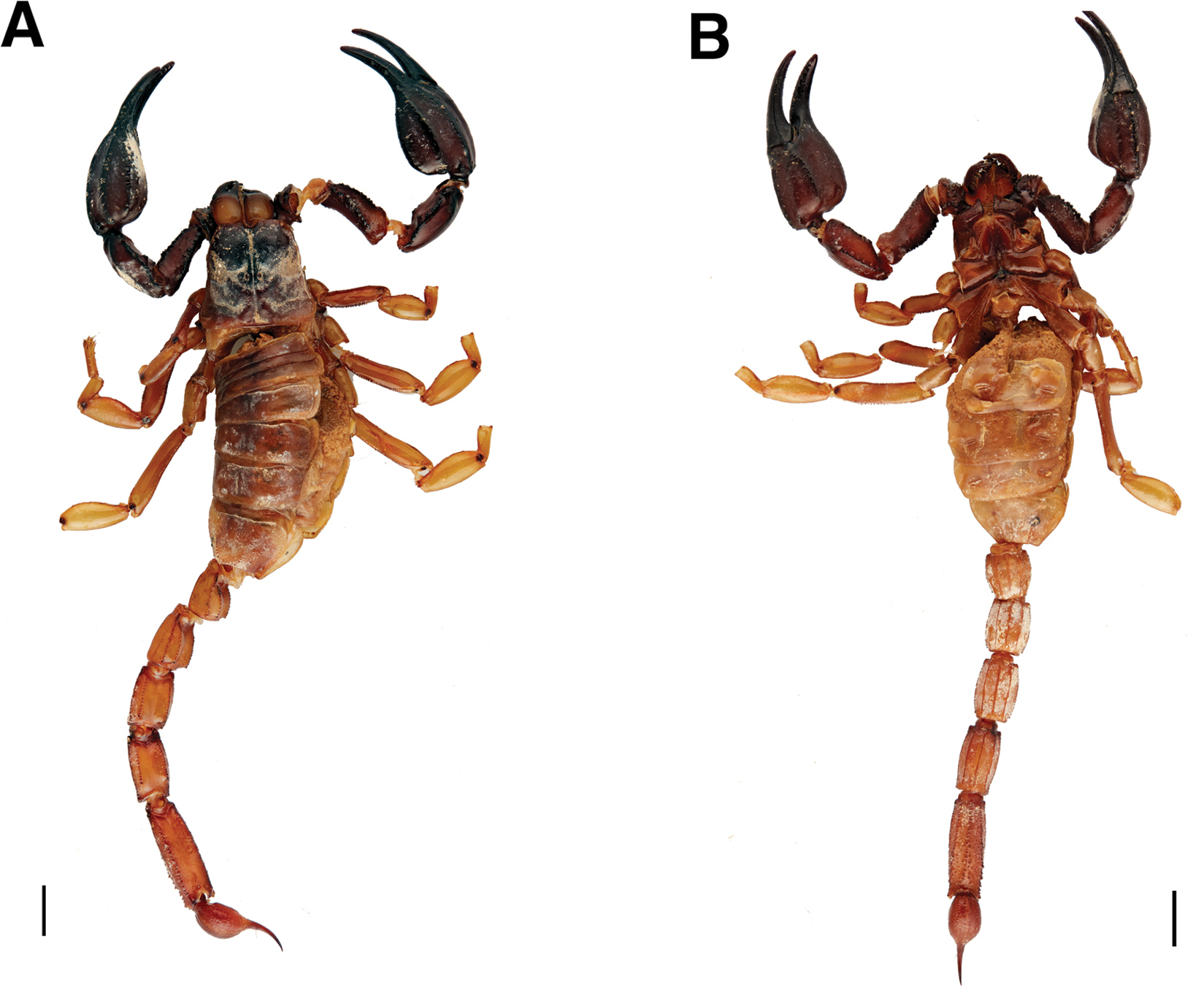
- Female syntype: dorsal (A) and ventral (B) aspects

Scientific classification
- Kingdom: Animalia
- Phylum: Arthropoda
- Subphylum: Chelicerata
- Class: Arachnida
- Order: Scorpiones
- Family: Urodacidae
- Genus: Urodacus
- Species: U. novaehollandiae

Binomial name
- Urodacus novaehollandiae Peters, 1861

Synonyms
- Iodacus orthurus Thorell, 1877; Urodacus bicolor Werner, 1936; Urodacus marianus Roewer, 1943

= Urodacus novaehollandiae =

Species of scorpion

Urodacus novaehollandiae, also known as the coastal burrowing scorpion or black sand scorpion, is a species of scorpion in the Urodacidae family. It is endemic to Australia, and was first described in 1861 by German naturaliat Wilhelm Peters.

== Description ==
The species grows to about 70–100 mm in length. Colouration is mainly yellowish-brown to dark brown, with the head and pincers darker.

== Distribution and habitat ==
The species occurs along the coast of South Australia from Adelaide westwards, around the Great Australian Bight and south-west Western Australia, to Perth. It is found in coastal dunes as well as in sandy soils further inland at the western end of its range.

== Behaviour ==
The scorpions are nocturnal ambush predators. They dig spiral burrows up to 1 m deep where they shelter during the day. They are known to live until at least 12 years old.

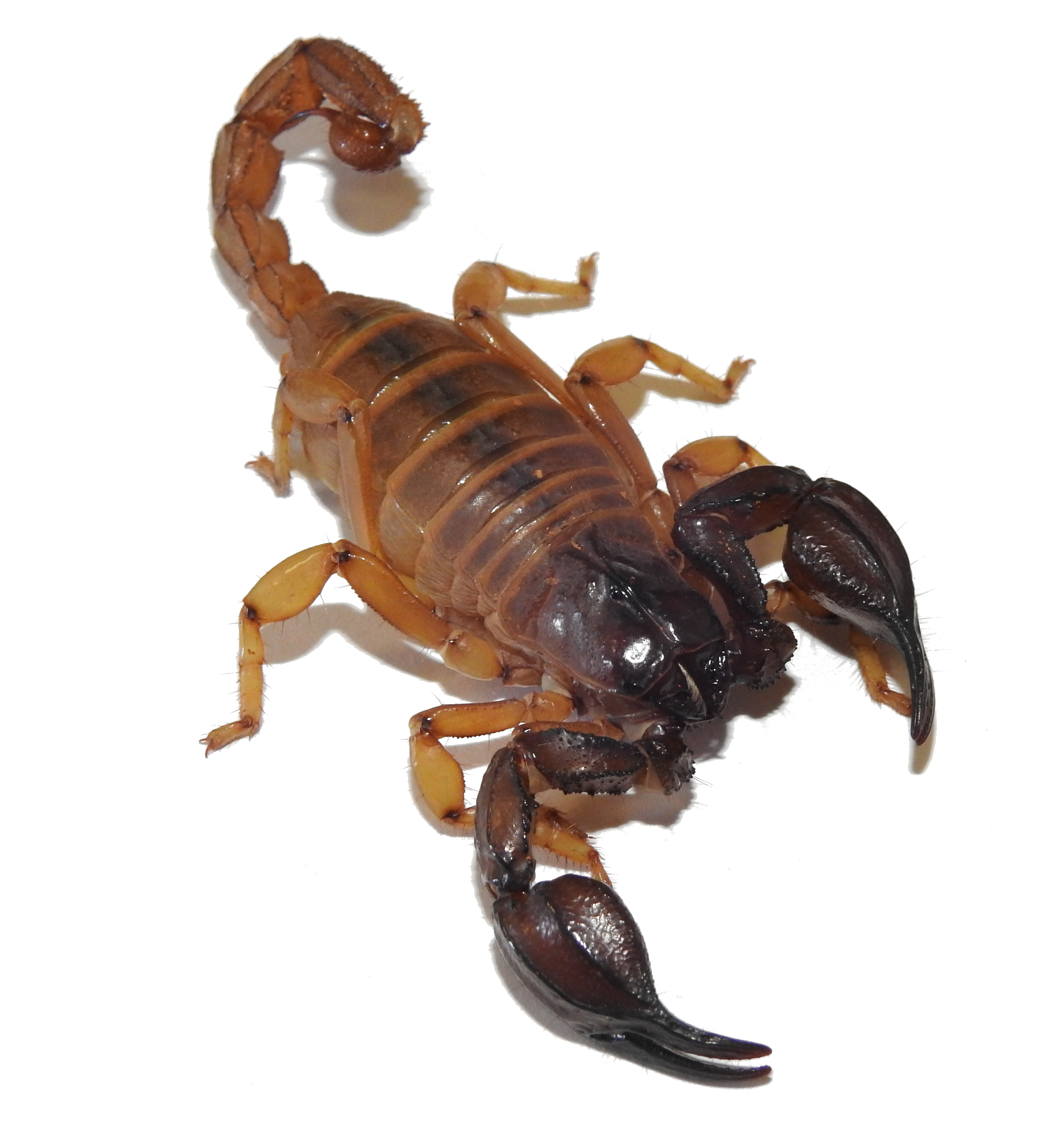
