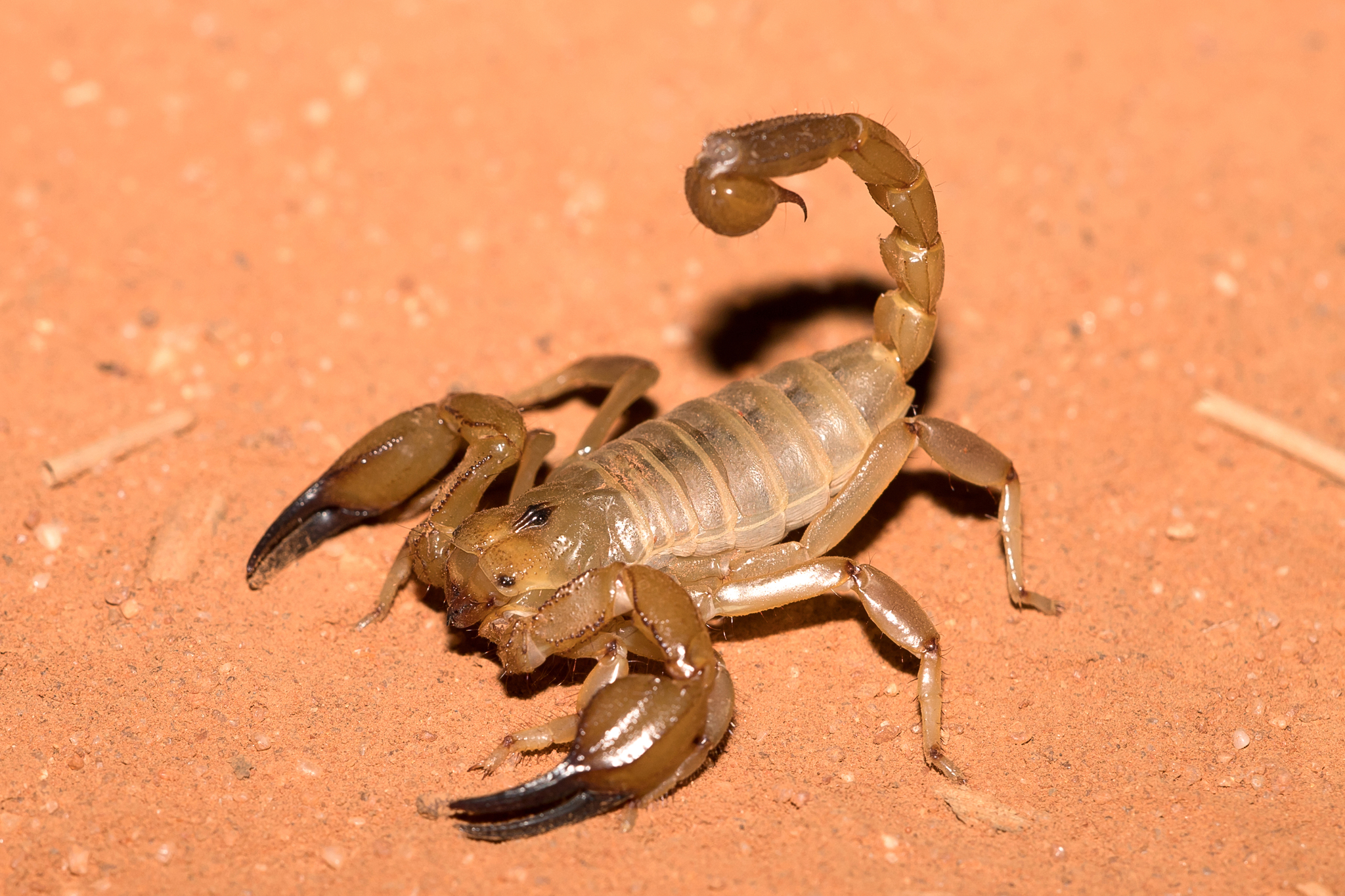
- Urodacus yaschenkoi photographed in the Riverland, South Australia

Scientific classification
- Domain: Eukaryota
- Kingdom: Animalia
- Phylum: Arthropoda
- Subphylum: Chelicerata
- Class: Arachnida
- Order: Scorpiones
- Family: Urodacidae
- Genus: Urodacus; Peters, 1861

Type species
- Urodacus novaehollandiae Peters, 1861

Synonyms
- Hemihoplopus Birula, 1903; Ioctonus Thorell, 1876; Iodacus Pocock, 1891

= Urodacus =

Genus of scorpions

Urodacus is a genus of scorpion belonging to the family Urodacidae. It was described by German naturalist Wilhelm Peters in 1861. The type species is U. novaehollandiae. Its species are native to Australia, and dig burrows. The genus was placed in its own family in 2000. Before this, the group had been a subfamily Urodacinae within the family Scorpionidae. There are likely many undescribed, cryptic species within the genus.

== Species ==
Urodacus contains the following species:

- Urodacus armatus Pocock, 1888
- Urodacus butleri Volschenk, Harvey & Prendini, 2012
- Urodacus carinatus Hirst, 1911
- Urodacus centralis L. E. Koch, 1977
- Urodacus elongatus L. E. Koch, 1977
- Urodacus excellens Pocock, 1888
- Urodacus giulianii L. E. Koch, 1977
- Urodacus hartmeyeri Kraepelin, 1908
- Urodacus hoplurus Pocock, 1898
- Urodacus koolanensis L. E. Koch, 1977
- Urodacus lowei L. E. Koch, 1977
- Urodacus lunatus Buzatto et al., 2023
- Urodacus macrurus Pocock, 1899
- Urodacus manicatus (Thorell, 1876)
- Urodacus mckenziei Volschenk, Smith & Harvey, 2000
- Urodacus megamastigus L. E. Koch, 1977
- Urodacus novaehollandiae Peters, 1861
- Urodacus planimanus Pocock, 1893
- Urodacus similis L. E. Koch, 1977
- Urodacus spinatus Pocock, 1902
- Urodacus uncinus Buzatto et al., 2023
- Urodacus varians Glauert, 1963
- Urodacus yaschenkoi (Birula, 1903)
