= Urodacus butleri =

Scientific classification
- Kingdom: Animalia
- Phylum: Arthropoda
- Subphylum: Chelicerata
- Class: Arachnida
- Order: Scorpiones
- Family: Urodacidae
- Genus: Urodacus
- Species: U. butleri

Binomial name
- Urodacus butleri Volschenk, Harvey & Prendini, 2012

Species of scorpion

Urodacus butleri is a species of scorpion in the Urodacidae family. It is endemic to Australia, and was first described in 2012.

== Etymology ==
The specific epithet butleri honours Australian naturalist, conservation consultant and television presenter Harry Butler.

== Description ==
The species grows to about 50–70 mm in length. Colouration is mainly dark brown.

== Distribution and habitat ==
The species has been recorded from Barrow Island and the adjacent Pilbara region of Western Australia on consolidated sandy substrates.
