= Urodacus armatus =

Scientific classification
- Kingdom: Animalia
- Phylum: Arthropoda
- Subphylum: Chelicerata
- Class: Arachnida
- Order: Scorpiones
- Family: Urodacidae
- Genus: Urodacus
- Species: U. armatus

Binomial name
- Urodacus armatus Pocock, 1888

Synonyms
- Urodacus granifrons Pocock, 1898; Urodacus woodwardii Pocock, 1893

Species of scorpion

Urodacus armatus, also known as the yellow sand scorpion or inland desert scorpion, is a species of scorpion in the Urodacidae family. It is native to Australia. It was first described in 1888 by British zoologist Reginald Innes Pocock.

== Description ==
The species grows to 30–60 mm in length. Colouring is usually light sandy with dark red leg joints.

== Distribution and habitat ==
The species is found over much of arid inland Australia on a variety of soils.

== Behaviour ==
The scorpions build short burrows and hunt small invertebrates through both active foraging and by ambushing their prey from the branches and foliage of low vegetation.
