= Heteroscorpion =

Scientific classification
- Domain: Eukaryota
- Kingdom: Animalia
- Phylum: Arthropoda
- Subphylum: Chelicerata
- Class: Arachnida
- Order: Scorpiones
- Superfamily: Scorpionoidea
- Family: Heteroscorpionidae; Kraeplin, 1905
- Genus: Heteroscorpion; Birula, 1903

Genus of scorpions

Heteroscorpion is a genus of scorpions belonging to the monotypic family Heteroscorpionidae.

The species of this genus are found in Madagascar.

Species:

- Heteroscorpion goodmani Lourenco, 1996
- Heteroscorpion kaii Lourenco & Goodman, 2009
- Heteroscorpion kraepelini Lourenco & Goodman, 2006
- Heteroscorpion magnus Lourenco & Goodman, 2002
- Heteroscorpion opisthacanthoides (Kraepelin, 1896)
- Heteroscorpion raselimananai Lourenco & Goodman, 2004
