= Holconia immanis =

Scientific classification
- Domain: Eukaryota
- Kingdom: Animalia
- Phylum: Arthropoda
- Subphylum: Chelicerata
- Class: Arachnida
- Order: Araneae
- Infraorder: Araneomorphae
- Family: Sparassidae
- Genus: Holconia
- Species: H. immanis

Binomial name
- Holconia immanis L. Koch, 1867

Synonyms
- Delena immanis Koch, L. 1867; Voconia immanis Koch, L. 1875; Isopeda immanis Hogg, 1903

Species of spider

Holconia immanis, commonly known as the Sydney huntsman spider and giant banded huntsman, is a species of huntsman spider found in eastern Australia.

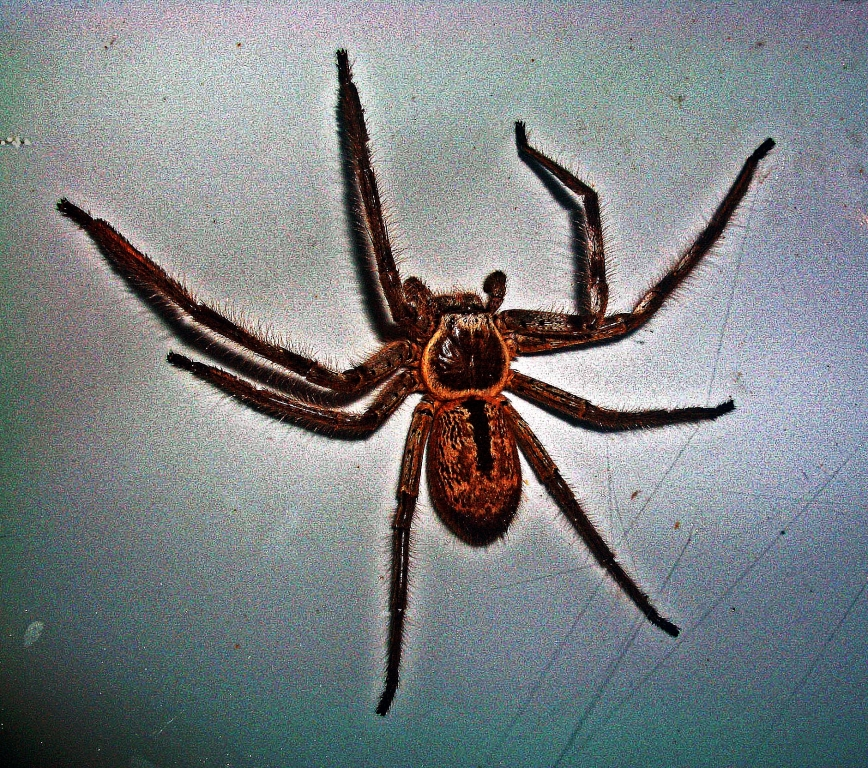
Holconia immanis - near Cooktown, Queensland, Australia in 2009

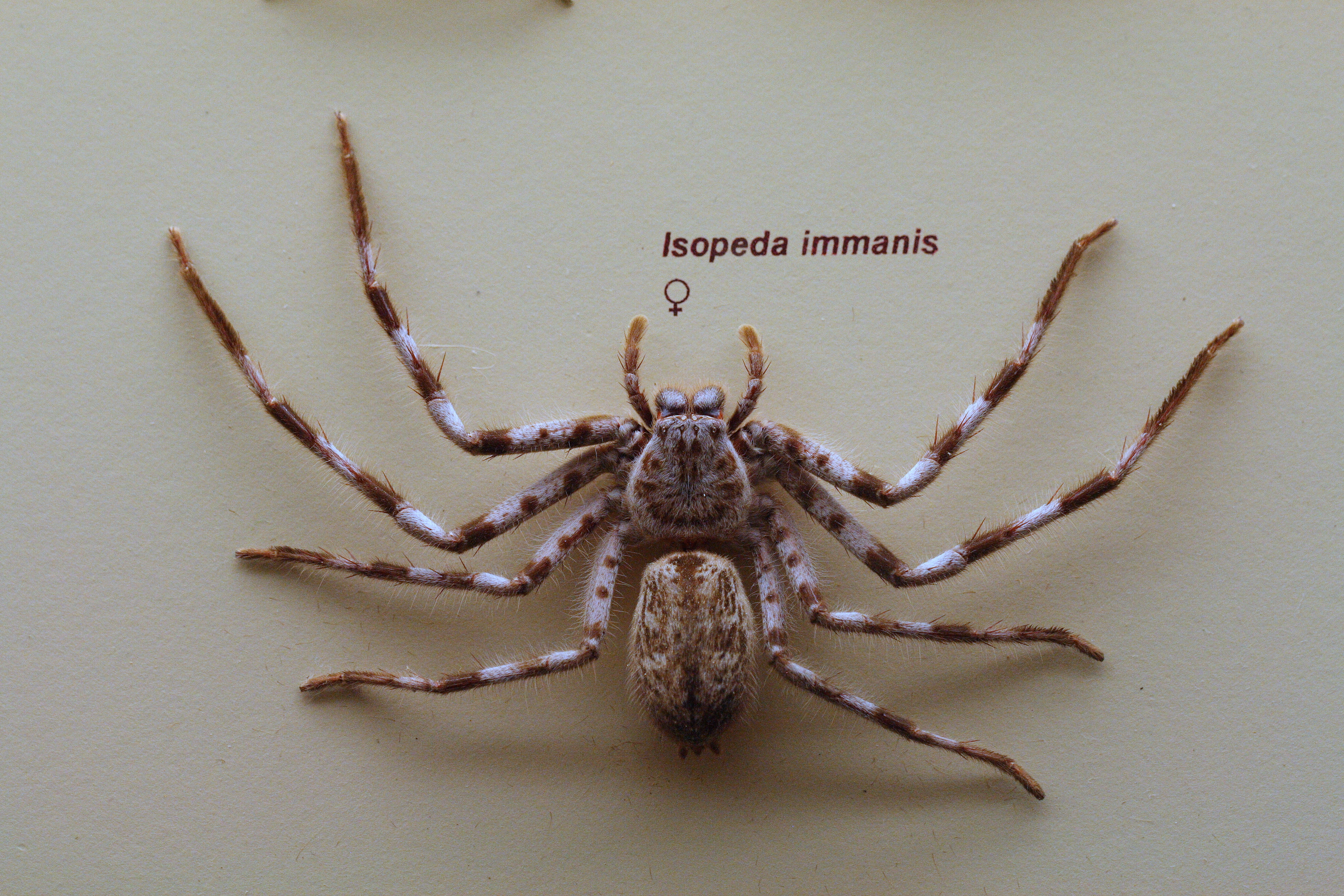
Female specimen in the Australian Museum

It was previously known as Isopeda immanis for many years. It is one of the largest species of huntsman in Australia and can have a body length of 4.5 cm and outstretched legs can measure 16 cm across.

The Sydney huntsman was described by Ludwig Carl Christian Koch in 1867 as Delena immanis, the specimen collected in Brisbane.

British amateur arachnologist Henry Roughton Hogg placed it in the genus Isopeda.
