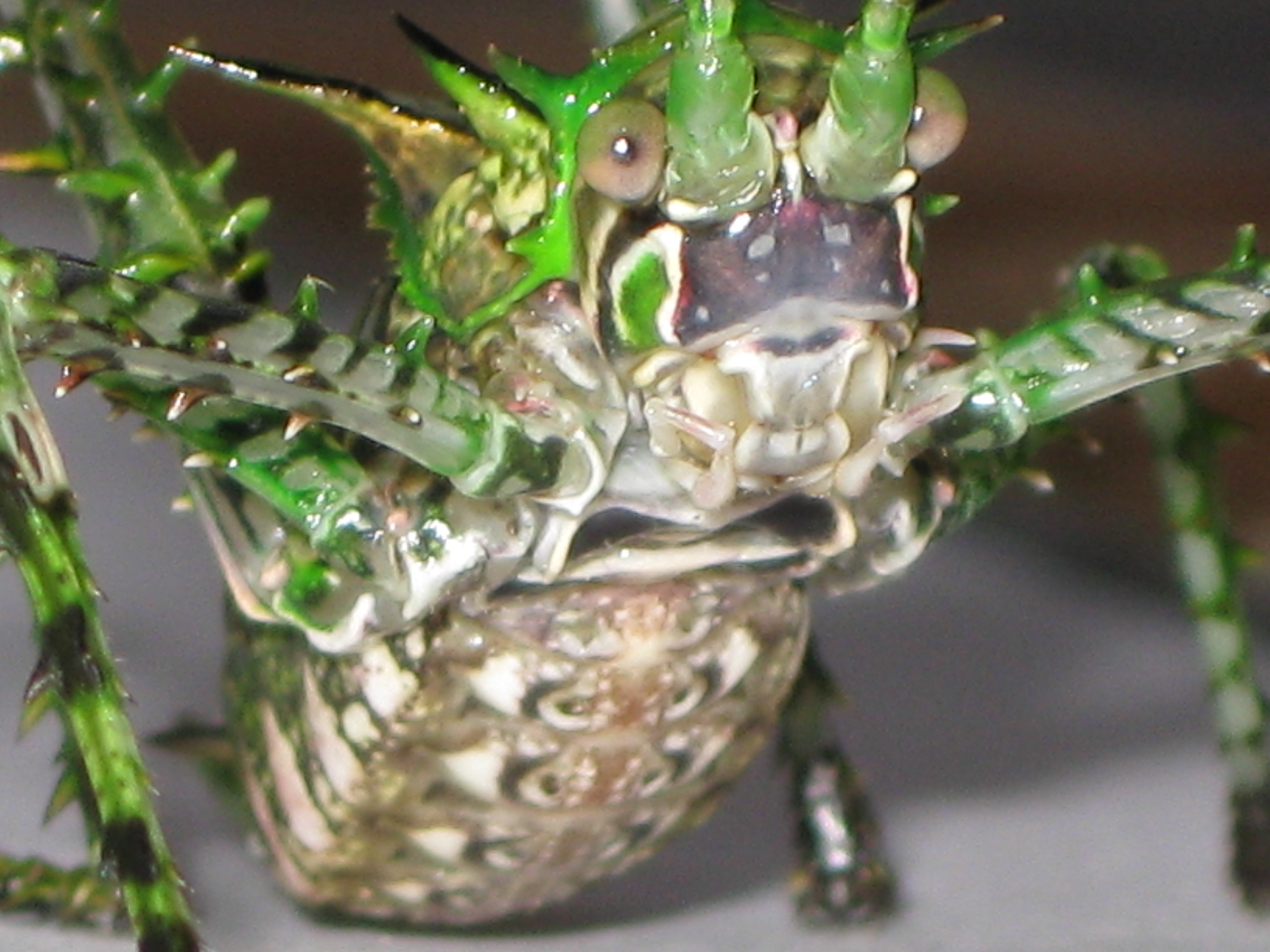

Scientific classification
- Domain: Eukaryota
- Kingdom: Animalia
- Phylum: Arthropoda
- Class: Insecta
- Order: Orthoptera
- Suborder: Ensifera
- Family: Tettigoniidae
- Subfamily: Pseudophyllinae
- Genus: Phricta
- Species: P. aberrans

Binomial name
- Phricta aberrans Brunner von Wattenwyl, 1895

Synonyms
- Diacanthodis aberrans Brunner von Wattenwyl 1895

= Phricta aberrans =

Species of cricket-like animal

Phricta aberrans is a species of spiny katydid native to northern New South Wales and southeast Queensland, Australia.

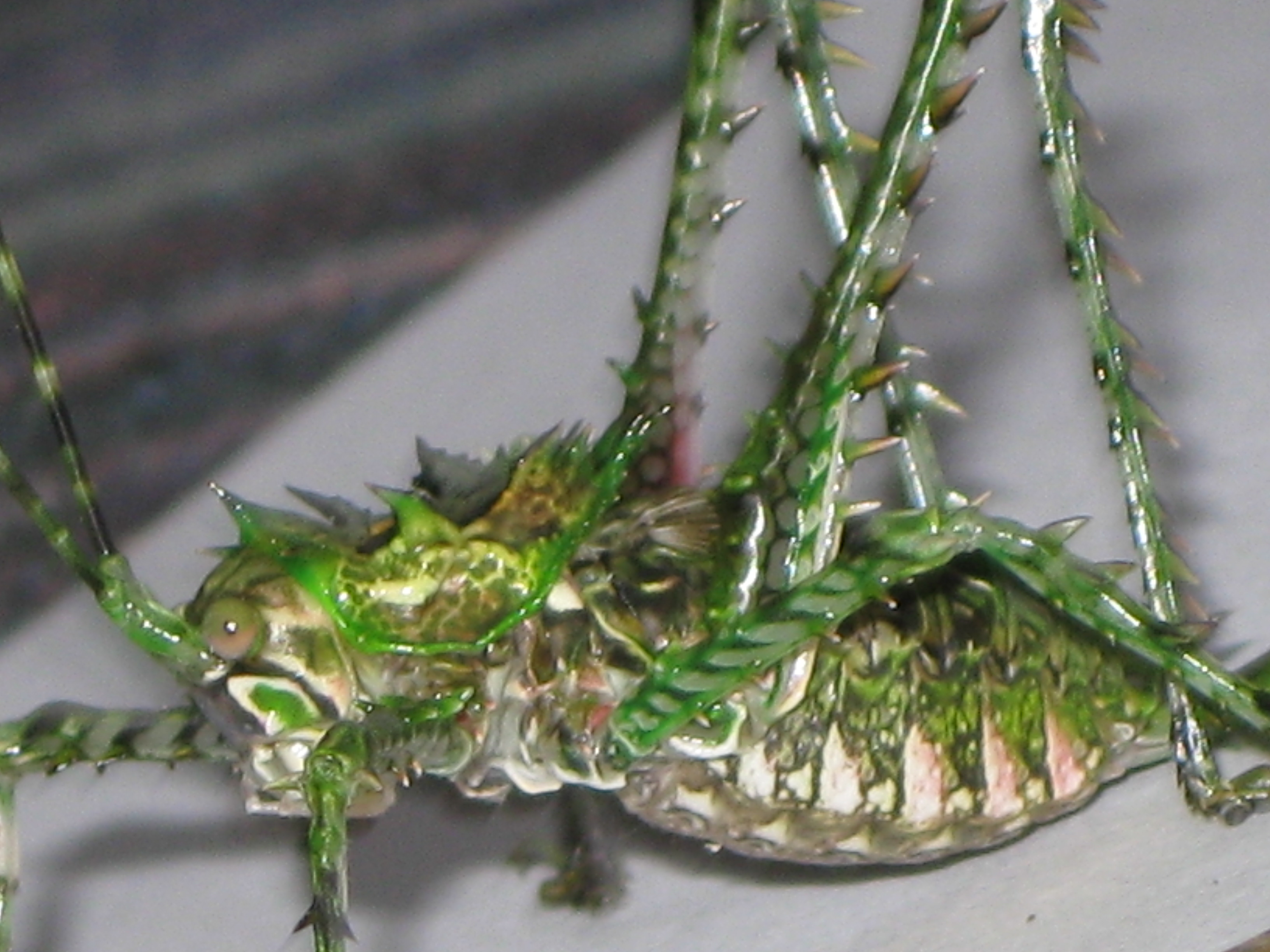
Late instar female

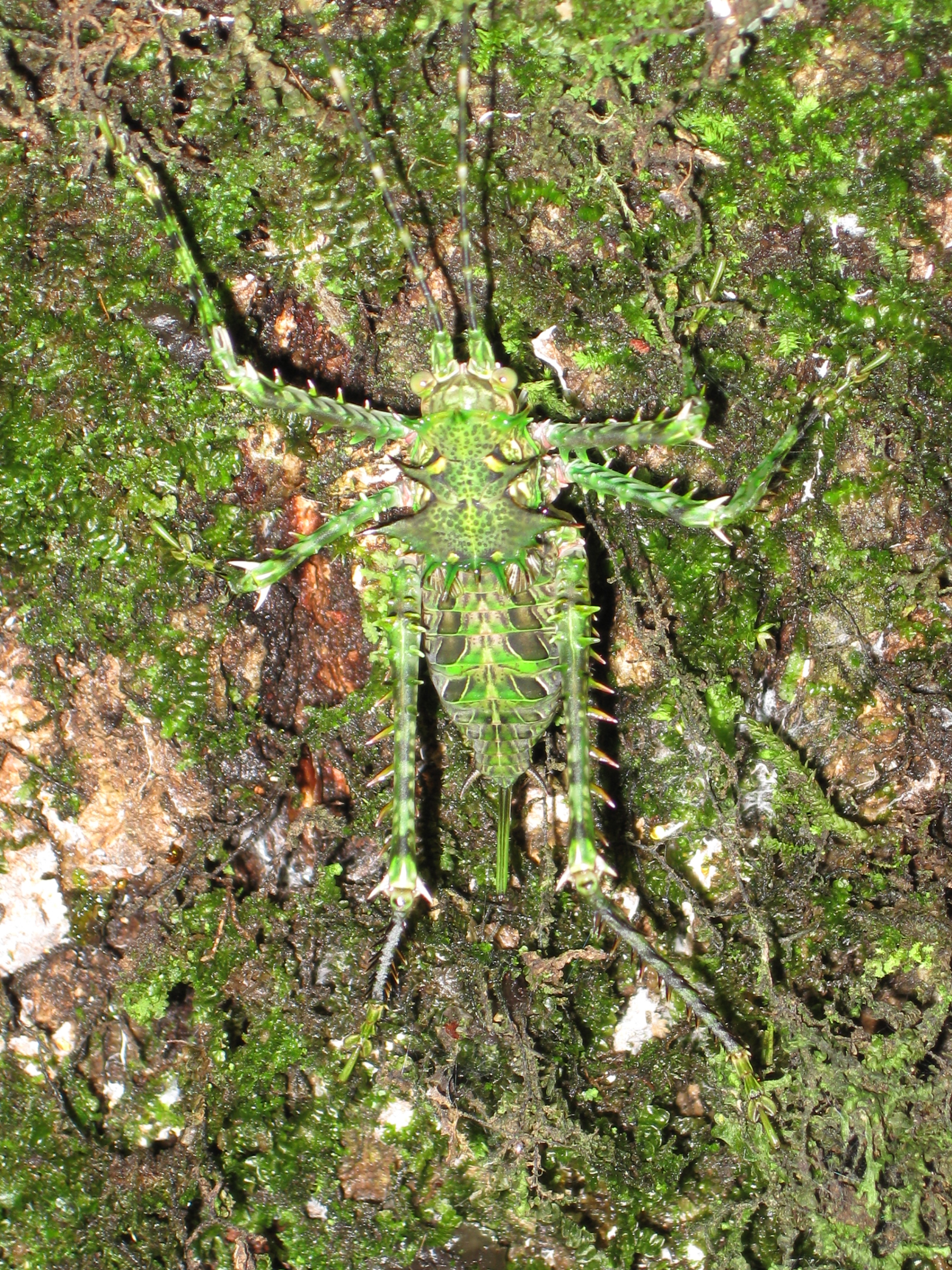
Late instar female

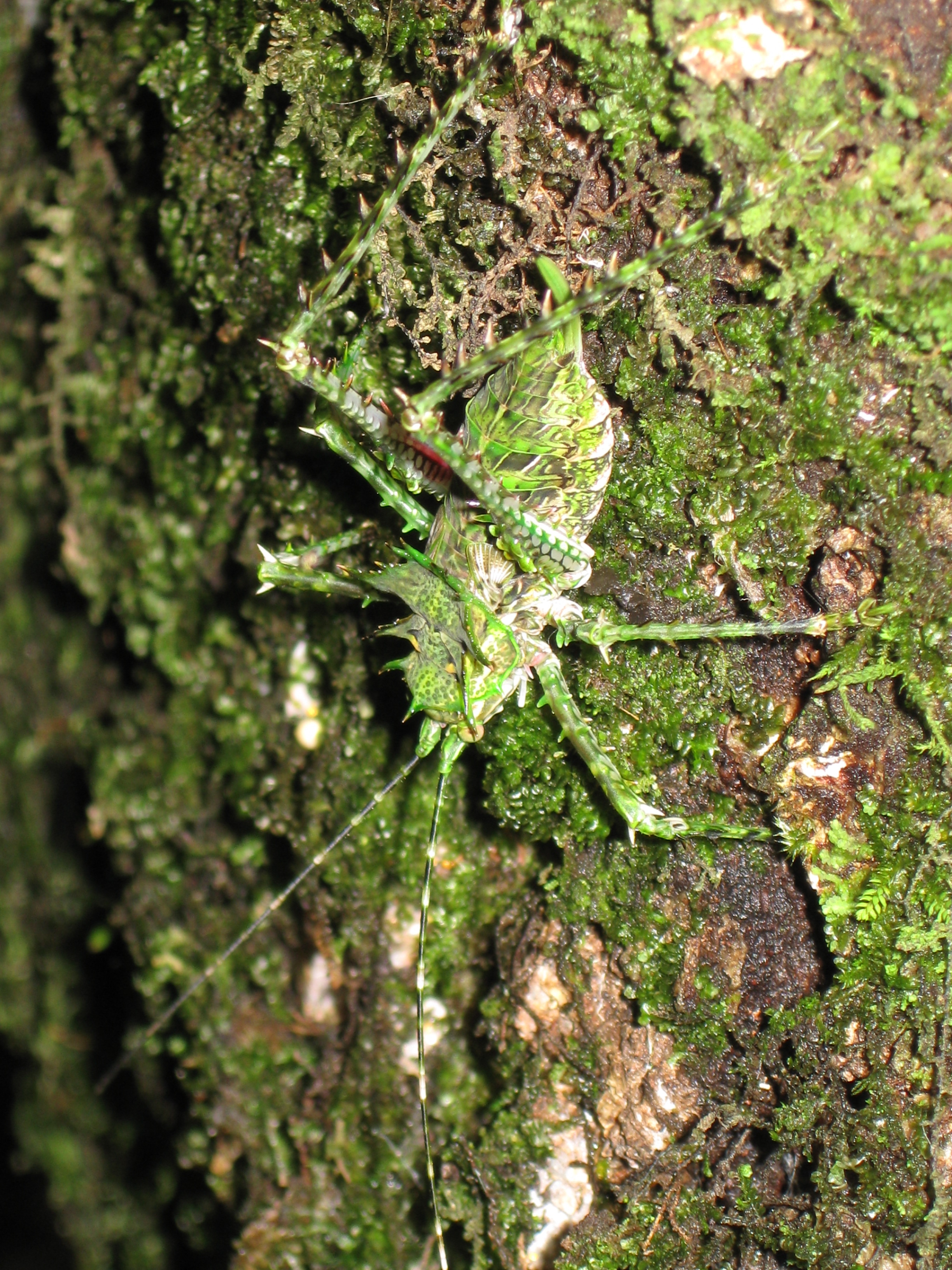
Late instar female
