= Urodacus macrurus =

Scientific classification
- Kingdom: Animalia
- Phylum: Arthropoda
- Subphylum: Chelicerata
- Class: Arachnida
- Order: Scorpiones
- Family: Urodacidae
- Genus: Urodacus
- Species: U. macrurus

Binomial name
- Urodacus macrurus Pocock, 1899

Species of scorpion

Urodacus macrurus is a species of scorpion in the Urodacidae family. It is endemic to Australia, and was first described in 1899 by British zoologist Reginald Innes Pocock.

== Distribution and habitat ==
The species occurs in Queensland.
