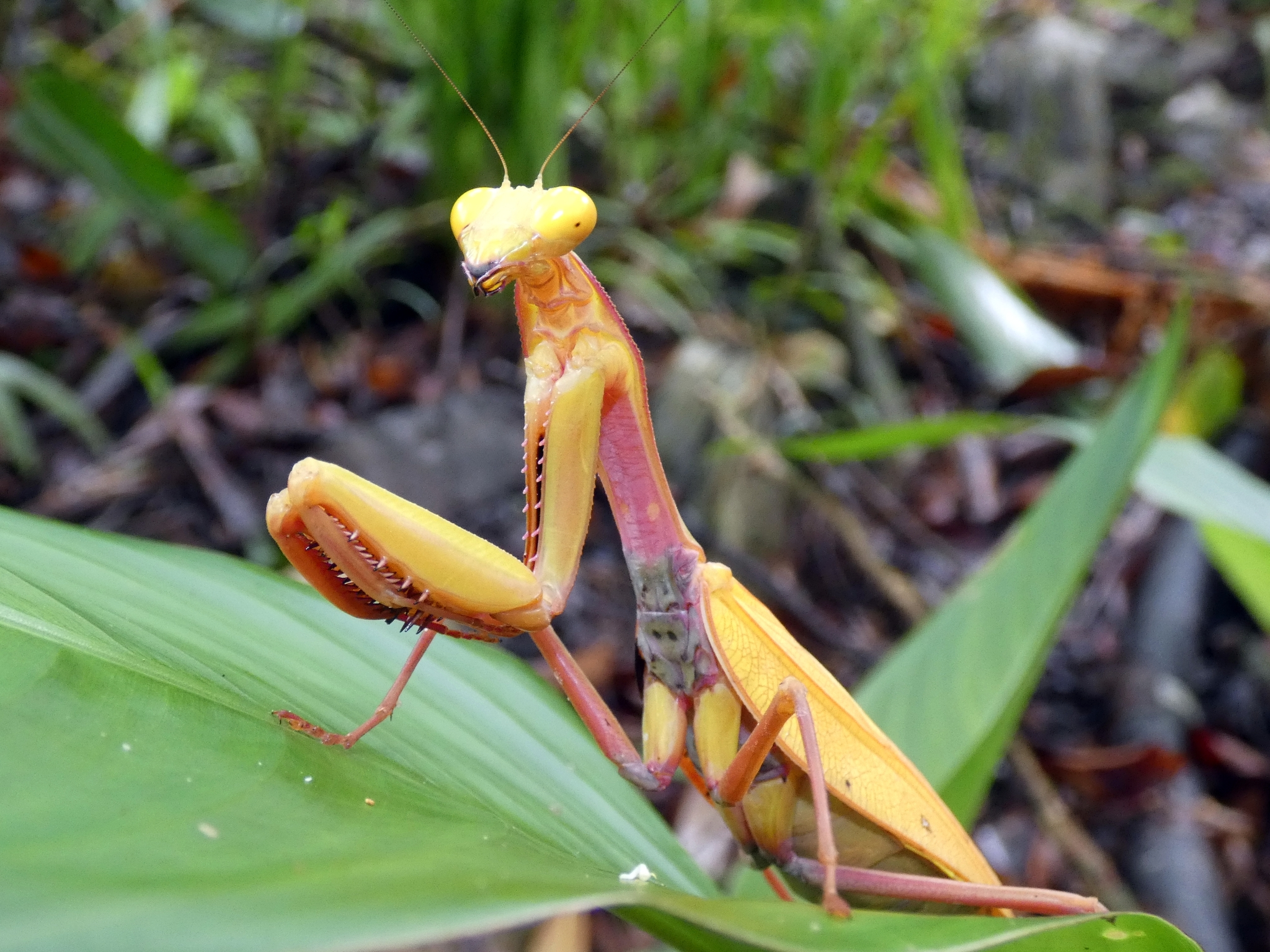
- Individual near Cape Tribulation, Queensland

Scientific classification
- Kingdom: Animalia
- Phylum: Arthropoda
- Clade: Pancrustacea
- Class: Insecta
- Order: Mantodea
- Family: Mantidae
- Genus: Hierodula
- Species: H. majuscula

Binomial name
- Hierodula majuscula (Tindale, 1923)

Synonyms
- Parhierodula majuscula Tindale, 1923

= Hierodula majuscula =

Species of praying mantis

Hierodula majuscula is a species of praying mantis in the genus Hierodula. It is also known as the giant rainforest mantis and the Australian giant mantis. It is found in coastal northern Australia, usually in rainforest and adjacent habitats. This species is typically green, although a less common bright yellow form does occur.

== Diet ==
It is predominantly a predator of insects including phasmids, grasshoppers, crickets, flies and other mantids. It also feeds on other invertebrate predators such as spiders and occasionally small vertebrates like geckos, frogs, and juvenile snakes.

== Description ==
Size is 7–11 cm (2.8–4.3 in) in total length from eye to wing. It is one of the largest mantis species in the world. The specific epithet "majuscula" means large in Latin.

== Classification ==
The species was originally described as Parhierodula majuscula from Northern Queensland near Cairns in 1923 by Norman Tindale. In 1935, the genus Parhierodula was synonymized with Hierodula by Max Beier.

== Gallery ==
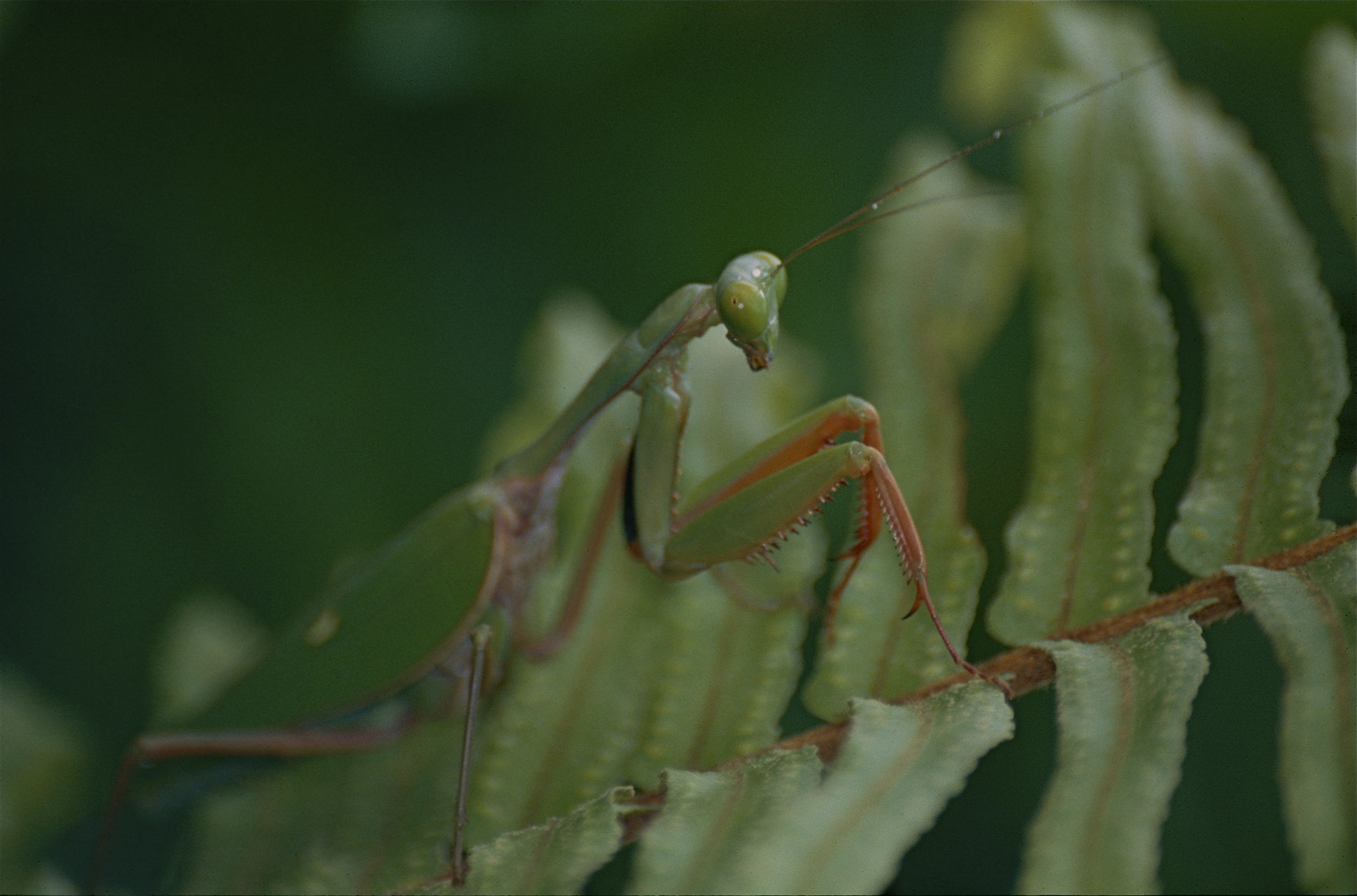
Adult

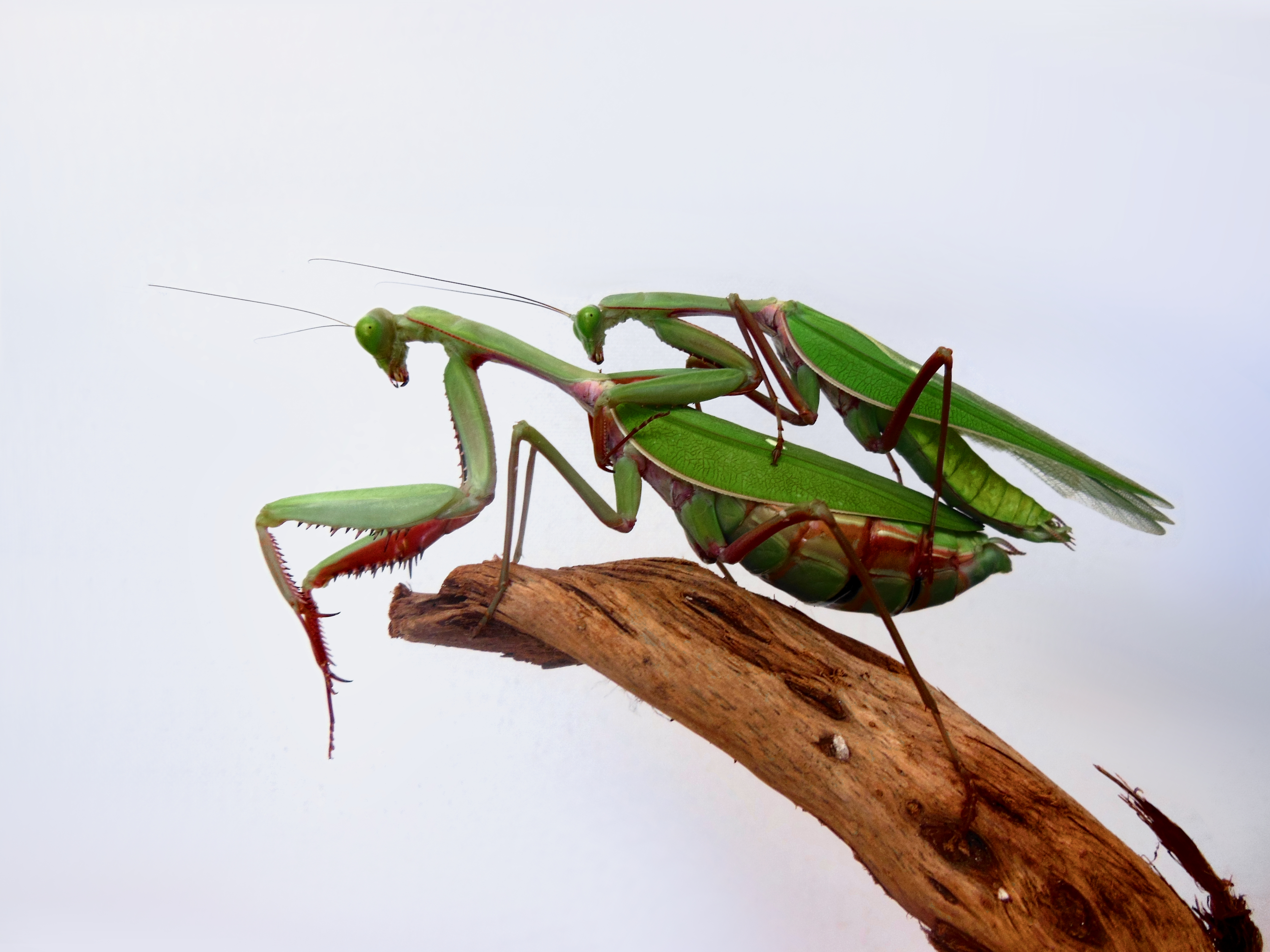
Mating couple

== See also ==
- List of mantis genera and species
