= Aops =

Scientific classification
- Kingdom: Animalia
- Phylum: Arthropoda
- Subphylum: Chelicerata
- Class: Arachnida
- Order: Scorpiones
- Family: Urodacidae
- Genus: Aops; Volschenk & Prendini, 2008
- Species: A. oncodactylus

Binomial name
- Aops oncodactylus Volschenk & Prendini, 2008

Genus of scorpion

Aops is a monotypic genus of scorpions in the Urodacidae family. Its sole species is the troglobitic Aops oncodactylus, which is endemic to Australia. It was first described in 2008 by Erich Volschenk and Lorenzo Prendini.

== Etymology ==
The generic name Aops comes from the Greek prefix a- (‘without’) and ops (‘eye’) because the scorpion is eyeless. The specific epithet oncodactylus derives from the Greek onkos (‘hook’) and daktylos (‘finger’) for the hooked ends of the pincer chelae.

== Description ==
The single specimen found, the holotype, is a juvenile female. It is the first troglobitic urodacid and the first troglobitic scorpion to be recorded from continental Australia. The specimen exhibits troglomorphic (adapted to cave-dwelling) features, including lack of eyes and pigmentation; it was blind, and its colouring was white to yellowish-cream.

== Distribution and habitat ==
The species was discovered in the course of a biotic survey of the caves of Barrow Island, a continental island lying 50 km off the coast of north-western Western Australia. The location was a chamber in Ledge Cave, which is only accessible by diving through a submerged passage.
