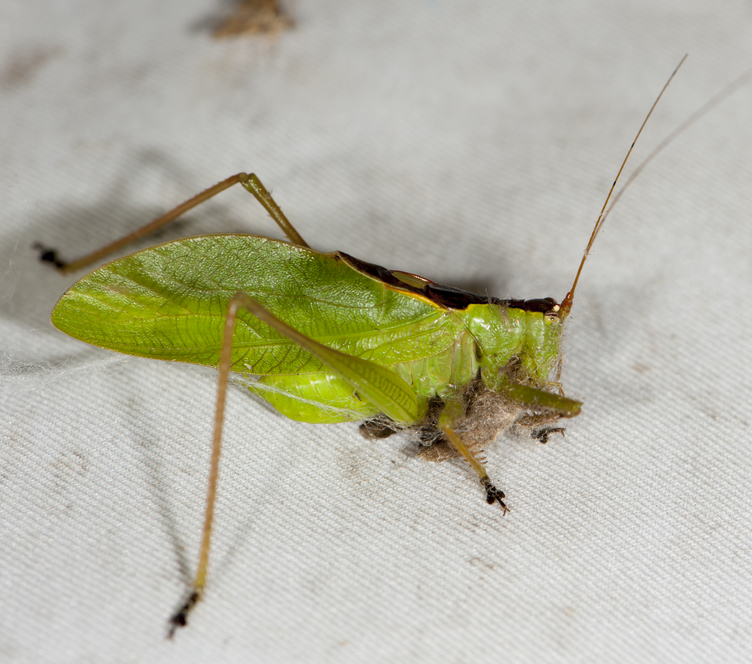
- Hexacentrus unicolor

Scientific classification
- Domain: Eukaryota
- Kingdom: Animalia
- Phylum: Arthropoda
- Class: Insecta
- Order: Orthoptera
- Suborder: Ensifera
- Family: Tettigoniidae
- Subfamily: Hexacentrinae
- Genus: Hexacentrus; Serville, 1831

Type species
- Hexacentrus unicolor Serville, 1831

Synonyms
- Hexacenthrus Griffini, 1908; Hexacentris Bruner, 1916; Piura Walker, 1869; Tedla Walker, 1869

= Hexacentrus =

Genus of cricket-like animals

Hexacentrus is the type genus of bush-crickets in the subfamily Hexacentrinae. Most species of this genus occur in Southeast Asia and in Africa.

== Species ==
The following are described species of Hexacentrus:

1. Hexacentrus alluaudi Bolívar, 1906
2. Hexacentrus australis Redtenbacher, 1891
3. Hexacentrus bifurcatus Farooqi & Usmani, 2018
4. Hexacentrus bilineata Montrouzier, 1855
5. Hexacentrus borneensis Willemse, 1961
6. Hexacentrus brachypterus Karny, 1926
7. Hexacentrus dorsatus Redtenbacher, 1891
8. Hexacentrus elegans Redtenbacher, 1891
9. Hexacentrus expansus Wang & Shi, 2005
10. Hexacentrus femoralis Dohrn, 1905
11. Hexacentrus fruhstorferi Dohrn, 1905
12. Hexacentrus formosanus Chen & He, 2021
13. Hexacentrus fuscipes Matsumura & Shiraki, 1908
14. Hexacentrus hareyamai Furukawa, 1941
15. Hexacentrus inflatissimus Gorochov & Warchalowska-Sliwa, 1999
16. Hexacentrus inflatus Redtenbacher, 1891
17. Hexacentrus japonicus Karny, 1907
18. Hexacentrus karnyi Griffini, 1909
19. Hexacentrus major Redtenbacher, 1891
20. Hexacentrus maximus Karny, 1907
21. Hexacentrus mundurra Rentz, 2001
22. Hexacentrus mundus Walker, 1869
23. Hexacentrus pusillus Redtenbacher, 1891
24. Hexacentrus spiniger Karny, 1920
25. Hexacentrus stali Krauss, 1904
26. Hexacentrus takakuwai Ishikawa & Karube, 2020
27. Hexacentrus unicolor Serville, 1831
  – type species, locality Java
28. Hexacentrus yunnaneus Bey-Bienko, 1962
