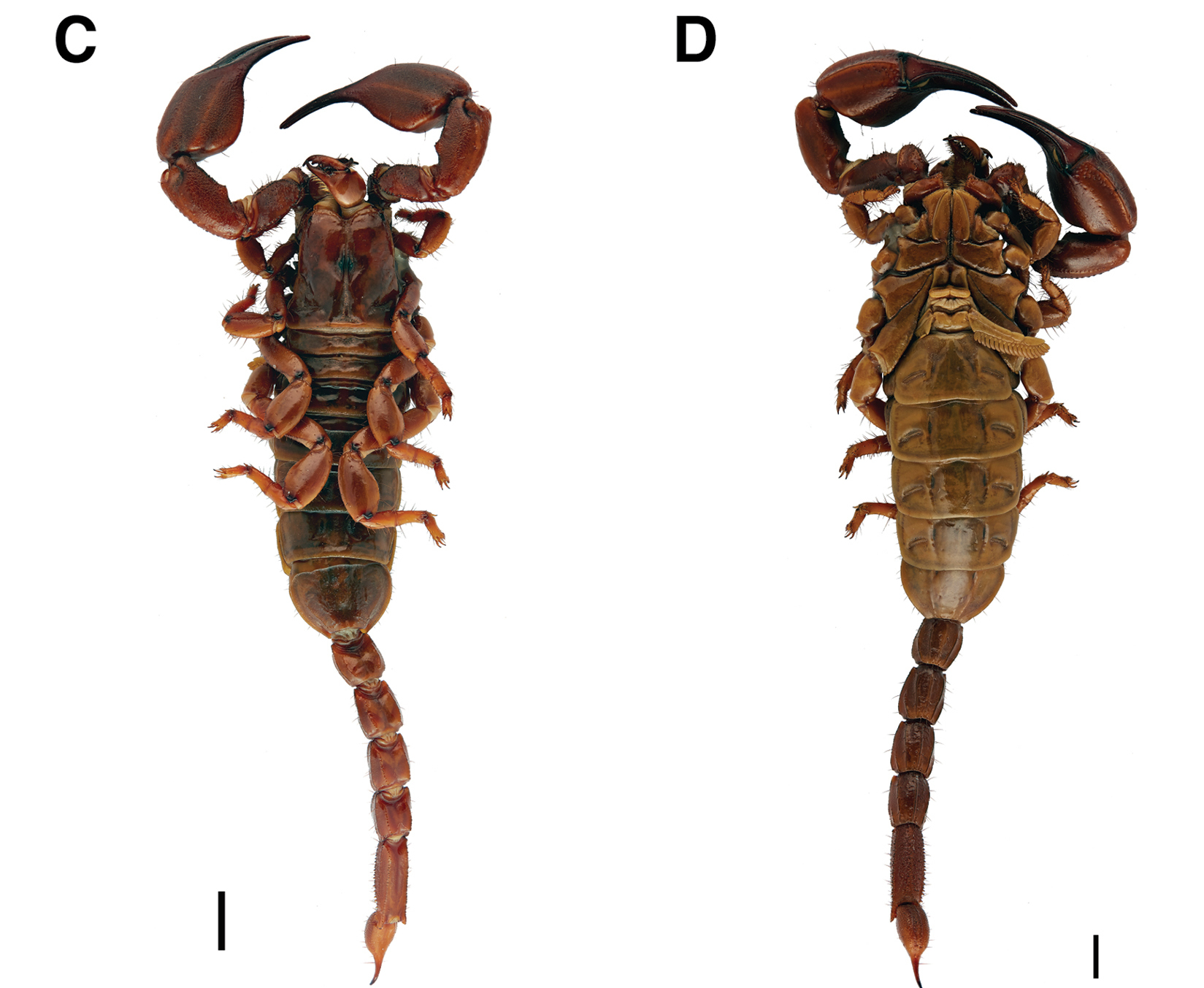
- Here shows a hypotype of a young female and an adult male

Scientific classification
- Kingdom: Animalia
- Phylum: Arthropoda
- Subphylum: Chelicerata
- Class: Arachnida
- Order: Scorpiones
- Family: Urodacidae
- Genus: Urodacus
- Species: U. yaschenkoi

Binomial name
- Urodacus yaschenkoi (Brooke, 1903)

= Urodacus yaschenkoi =

Species of scorpion

Urodacus yaschenkoi, also known as the inland scorpion or the desert scorpion, is a species of scorpion belonging to the family Urodacidae. It is native to central Australia. It is also referred as the desert robust scorpion, because of its robust black colour and a long tail lined with a deadly hook.

== Taxonomy ==
The genus Urodacus was placed in its own family in 2000. Before this, the group had been a subfamily Urodacinae within the family Scorpionidae.

== Description ==
Measuring up to 7 cm (2.8 in), it is one of largest species of scorpion native to Australia. It has a red-yellow-brown carapace, with tergites, tail and pedipalps a darker red to red-black. Its underside and legs are brown-yellow. The male has a long spiked tail, while the female has a short tail lined with deadly venom.

== Distribution and habitat ==
The species ranges across inland Australia from Birdsville on the border of southwestern Queensland and northwestern New South Wales across South Australia and the southern Northern Territory to Broome and Laverton in Western Australia. It is found in arid regions of inland Australia in habitat such as sand dunes.

== Behaviour ==
The desert scorpion builds and resides in a spiral burrow in the sand. A field study near Broken Hill measured the burrows and found they all had the same basic structure: a sloping entrance chamber to a depth of 8–10 cm, followed by up to nine spiral turns leading to a lower horizontal terminal chamber. The depth of the burrow and number of spiral turns depended on the instar of the scorpion; the younger (2nd instar) scorpion burrows were 15–20 cm deep while those of the oldest (6th instar) scorpions reached a depth of around 100 cm. The scorpion digs by moving sand with its chelicerae and scraping it backwards under successive pairs of legs. The amount of sand removed can be 200–400 times its own weight. Experiments showed inland robust scorpions could build burrows in 8–10 hours.

== In culture ==
Able to live 10–15 years in captivity, it is seen for sale in pet shops in Australia.
