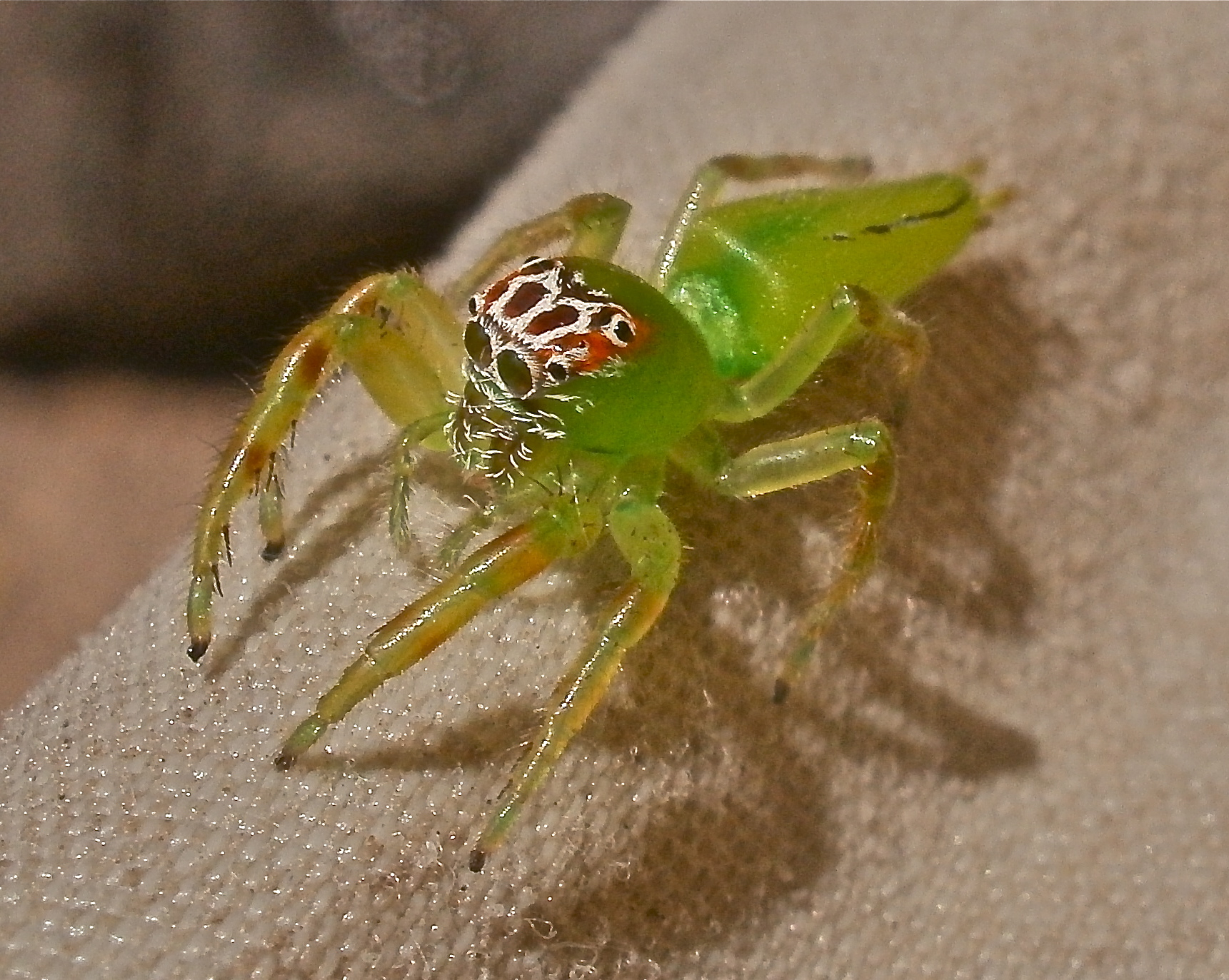
- Mopsus mormon female from the Kimberley region of Western Australia
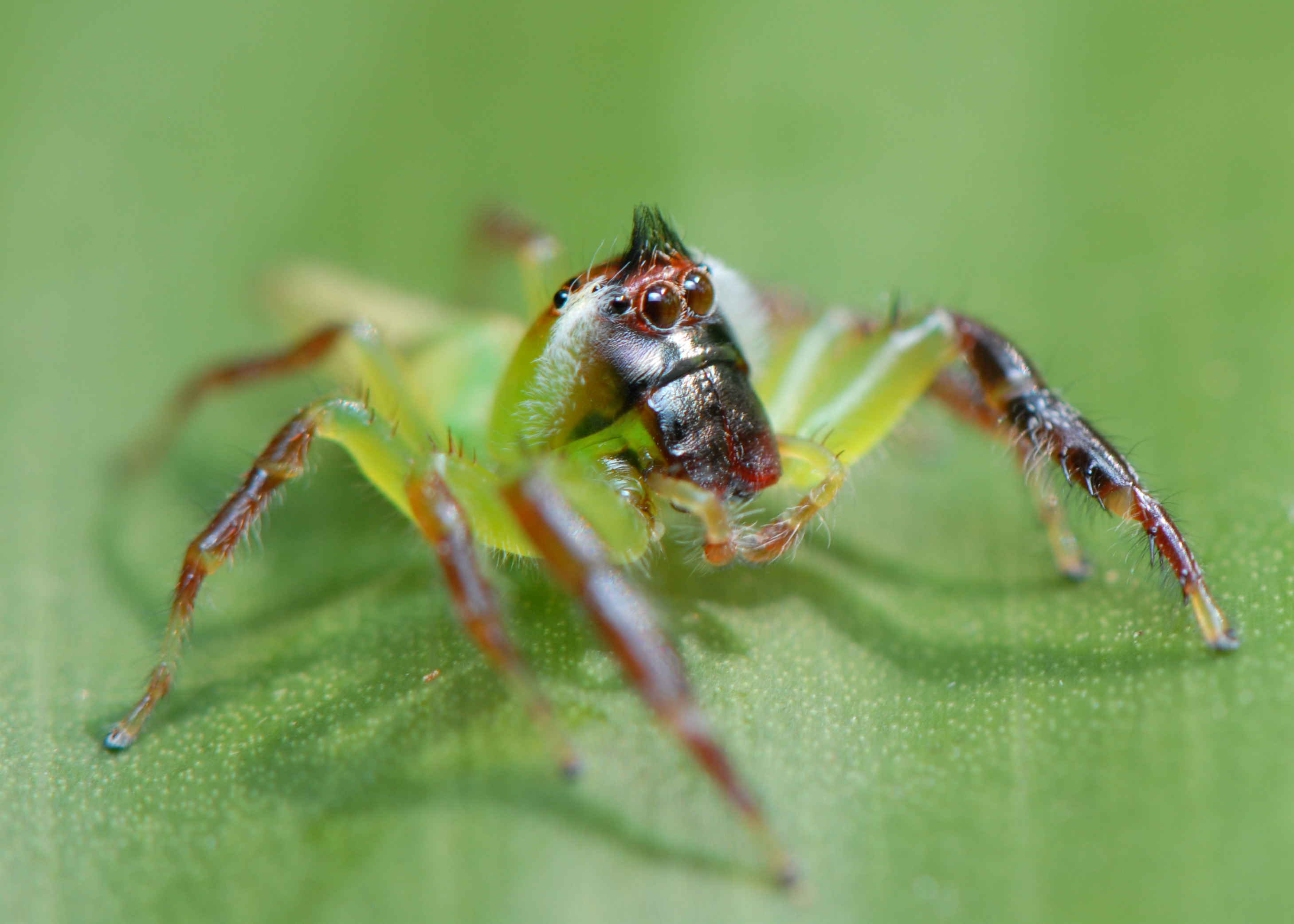
- Mopsus mormon male from Queensland, Australia. The 'whiskers' and 'topknot' are visible.

Scientific classification
- Kingdom: Animalia
- Phylum: Arthropoda
- Subphylum: Chelicerata
- Class: Arachnida
- Order: Araneae
- Infraorder: Araneomorphae
- Family: Salticidae
- Subfamily: Salticinae
- Genus: Mopsus; Karsch, 1878
- Species: M. mormon

Binomial name
- Mopsus mormon Karsch, 1878

Synonyms
- Ascyltus penicillatus; Mopsus penicillatus

= Mopsus mormon =

Species of Australian spider

Mopsus mormon is an Australian spider species of the family Salticidae (jumping spiders). It is the sole species in the genus Mopsus. It is found in New Guinea and eastern Australia. It is commonly called the green jumping spider.

== Description ==
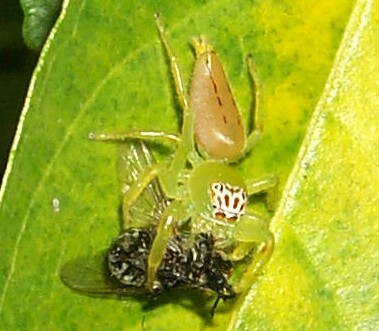
Female Mopsus mormon eating a fly

At 12 mm (female), this is one of Australia's larger jumping spiders, and very common in Queensland. It also occurs in New Guinea, northern New South Wales, the Northern Territory, northern Tasmania and Western Australia.

The males are strikingly coloured and decorated with long white "side whiskers", which rise to a peak surmounted by a topknot of black hairs. Females lack the whiskers and topknot, but instead feature a red and white "mask".

== Behaviour ==
This species shows a complex display repertoire, in some respects similar to that of several Phidippus species (P. johnsoni, P. comatus) and Portia fimbriata. However, this is likely to be convergent evolution. Alternative mating tactics have been described, depending on the location of the female. If she is away from her nest, a type of courtship common with many other species is observed. If she is found at a nest, probing and other behaviours similar to Phidippus johnsoni occur. This second courtship seems not to depend on vision. Like many other salticids, the adult lives together with the subadult female in an adjacent nest until it matures, then mates with her inside her nest.
