= Isometroides vescus =

Scientific classification
- Kingdom: Animalia
- Phylum: Arthropoda
- Subphylum: Chelicerata
- Class: Arachnida
- Order: Scorpiones
- Family: Buthidae
- Genus: Isometroides
- Species: I. vescus

Binomial name
- Isometroides vescus (Karsch, 1880)

Synonyms
- Isometrus vescus Karsch, 1880

Species of scorpion

Isometroides vescus, also known as the spider-hunting scorpion or spiral burrow scorpion, is a species of scorpion in the Buthidae family. It is native to Australia, and was first described by German arachnologist Ferdinand Karsch in 1880.

== Description ==
The species grows to about 50 mm in length. It is mainly golden-brown in colour, with a dark brown tail tip.

== Distribution and habitat ==
Found across much of inland Australia, except for the far north, the species occurs in sclerophyll forests and woodlands, as well as saltbush plains.

== Behaviour ==
The scorpions are specialised free-ranging nocturnal predators of trapdoor spiders, and are often found in the vacant burrows of their prey.
