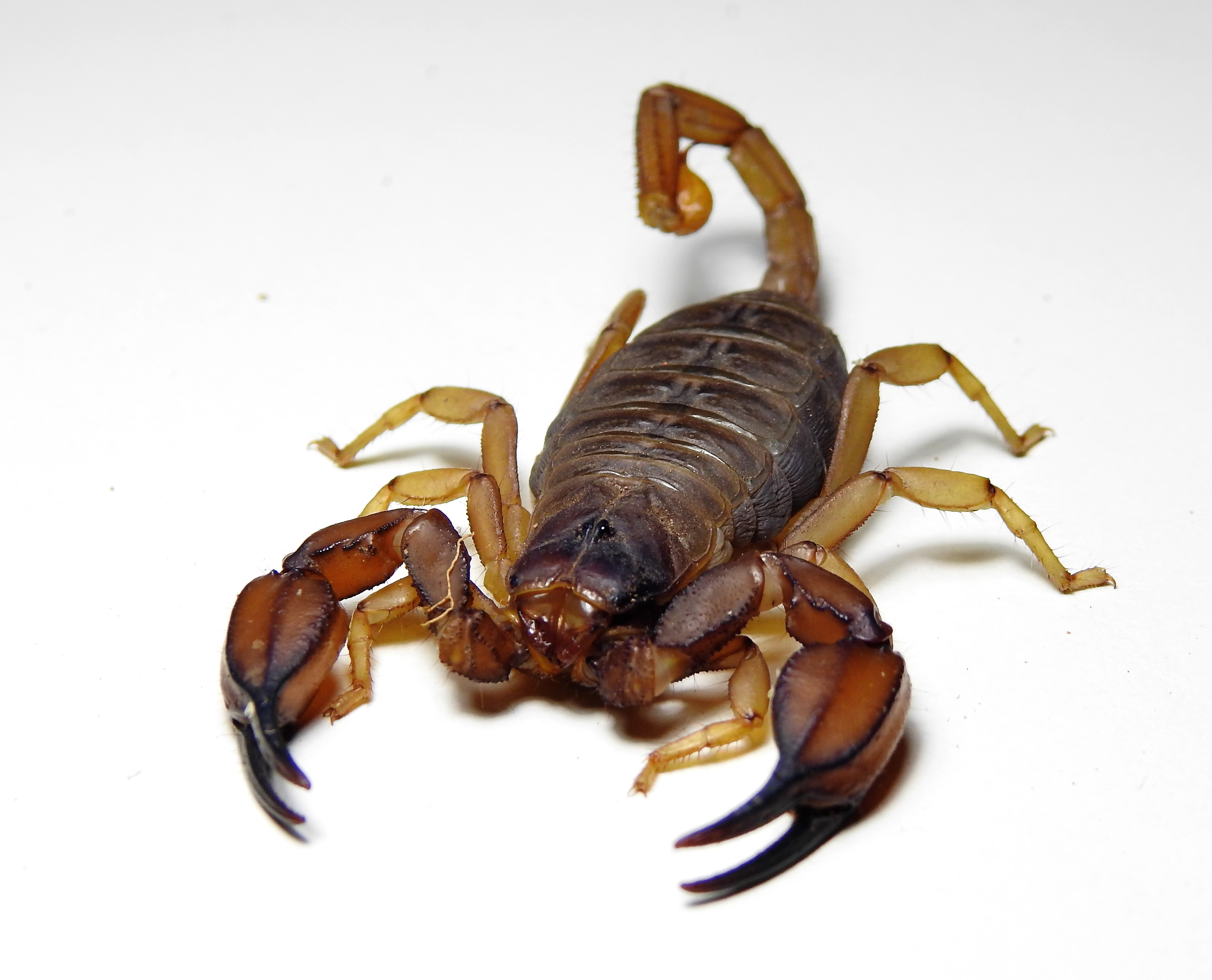
- Urodacus elongatus

Scientific classification
- Kingdom: Animalia
- Phylum: Arthropoda
- Subphylum: Chelicerata
- Class: Arachnida
- Order: Scorpiones
- Family: Urodacidae; Pocock, 1893

= Urodacidae =

Family of scorpions

Urodacidae is a family containing two genera of scorpions, both of which are endemic to Australia. It was first described by British zoologist Reginald Innes Pocock in 1893. Formerly a subfamily (Urodacinae) of the Scorpionidae, it was later raised to family rank. Its sister taxon is the monotypic family Heteroscorpionidae, the species of which are confined to Madagascar.

== Genera ==
- Aops Volschenk & Prendini, 2008 - (1 sp.)
- Urodacus Peters, 1861 - (21 spp.)
