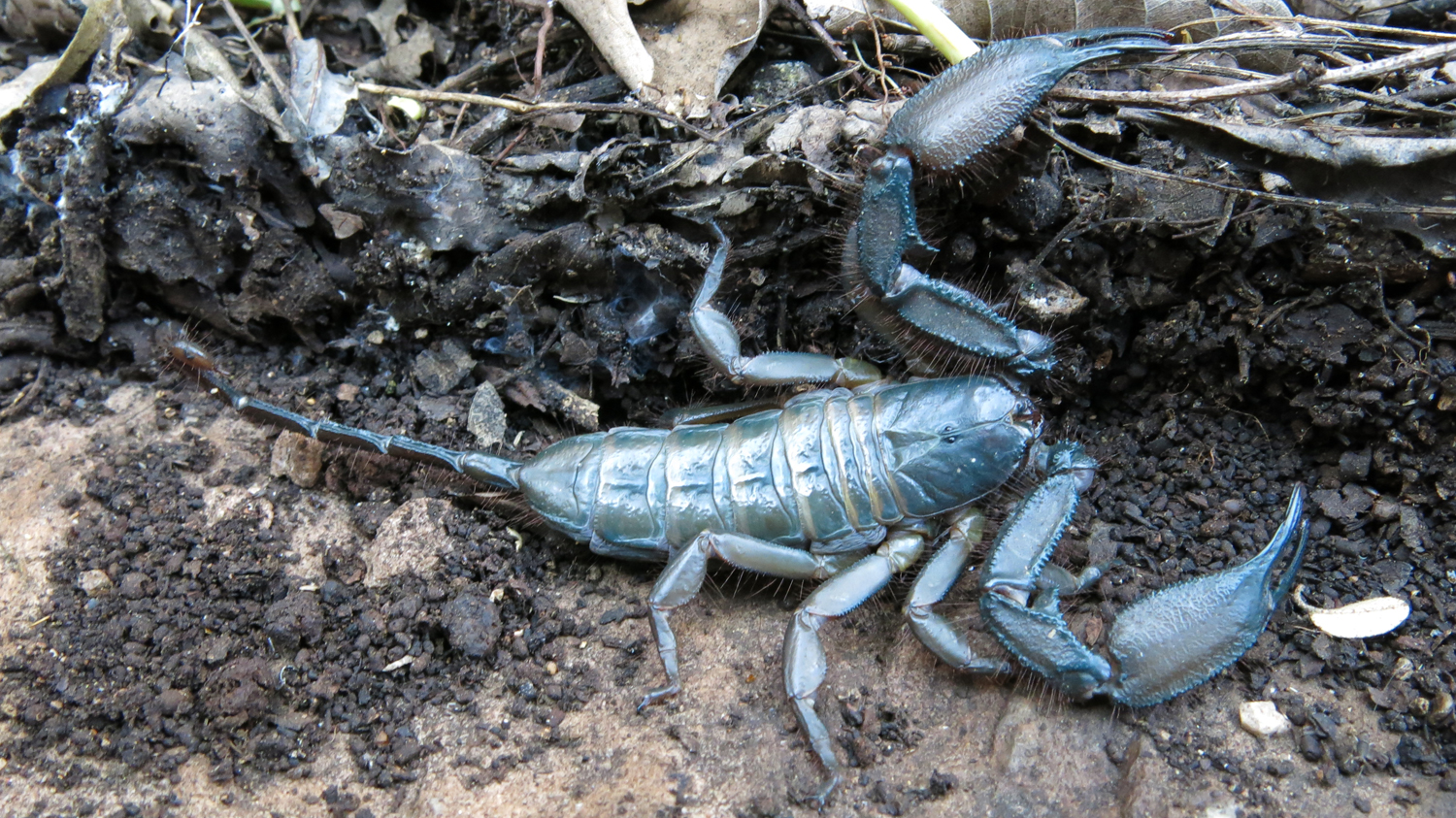
- Adult female in the Soutpansberg, South Africa

Scientific classification
- Domain: Eukaryota
- Kingdom: Animalia
- Phylum: Arthropoda
- Subphylum: Chelicerata
- Class: Arachnida
- Order: Scorpiones
- Family: Hormuridae
- Genus: Hadogenes
- Species: H. soutpansbergensis

Binomial name
- Hadogenes soutpansbergensis Prendini, 2006

= Hadogenes soutpansbergensis =

Species of scorpion

Hadogenes soutpansbergensis is a scorpion species endemic to South Africa in the bicolor group of the genus Hadogenes. It is named after the Soutpansberg mountain range where it was found.

== Taxonomic history ==
The species was formally described in 2006, although Prendini first collected a pair of adults of this species in 1990.

== Works cited ==
- Prendini, Lorenzo (2006). "New South African Flat Rock Scorpions (Liochelidae, Hadogenes)". American Museum Novitates (3502): 1–32. doi:10.1206/0003-0082(2006)502[0001:NSAFRS]2.0.CO;2. hdl:2246/5681.
