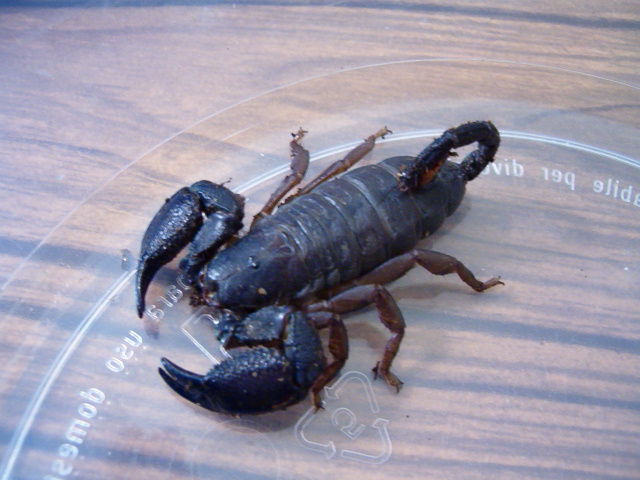

Scientific classification
- Kingdom: Animalia
- Phylum: Arthropoda
- Subphylum: Chelicerata
- Class: Arachnida
- Order: Scorpiones
- Family: Hormuridae
- Genus: Opisthacanthus
- Species: O. rugiceps

Binomial name
- Opisthacanthus rugiceps Pocock, 1897

= Opisthacanthus rugiceps =

Species of scorpion

Opisthacanthus rugiceps is a species of African scorpion.

== Distribution ==
Opisthacanthus rugiceps is found in East Africa, and extends further than 15° south only in Malawi.

== Systematics ==
Opisthacanthus rugiceps belongs to the "asper group" in the subgenus Nepabellus of the genus Opisthacanthus in the family Hormuridae.
