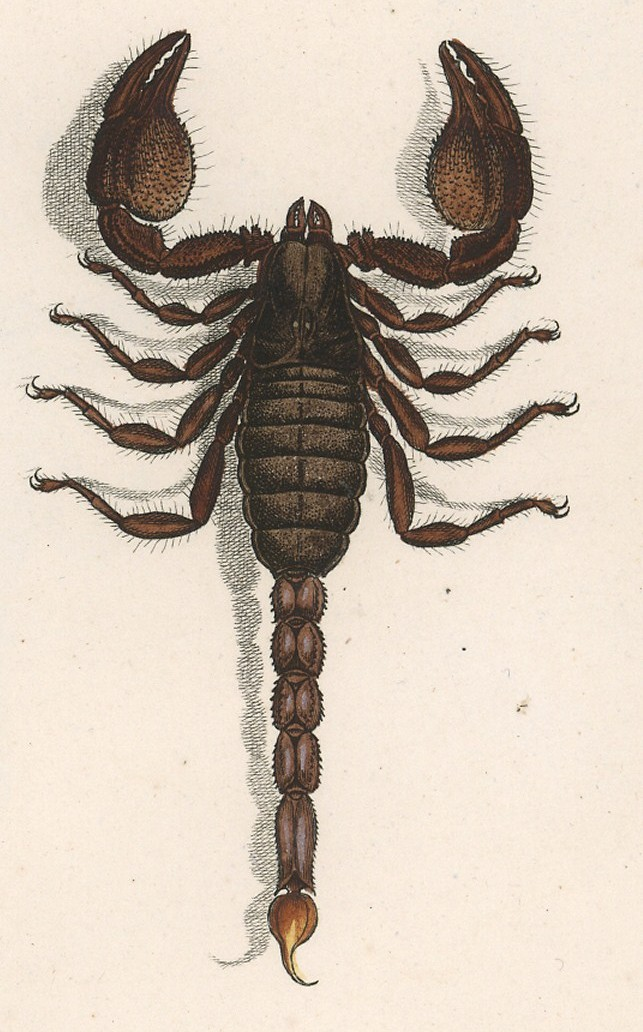
- Opisthacanthus capensis by Johann Friedrich Wilhelm Herbst
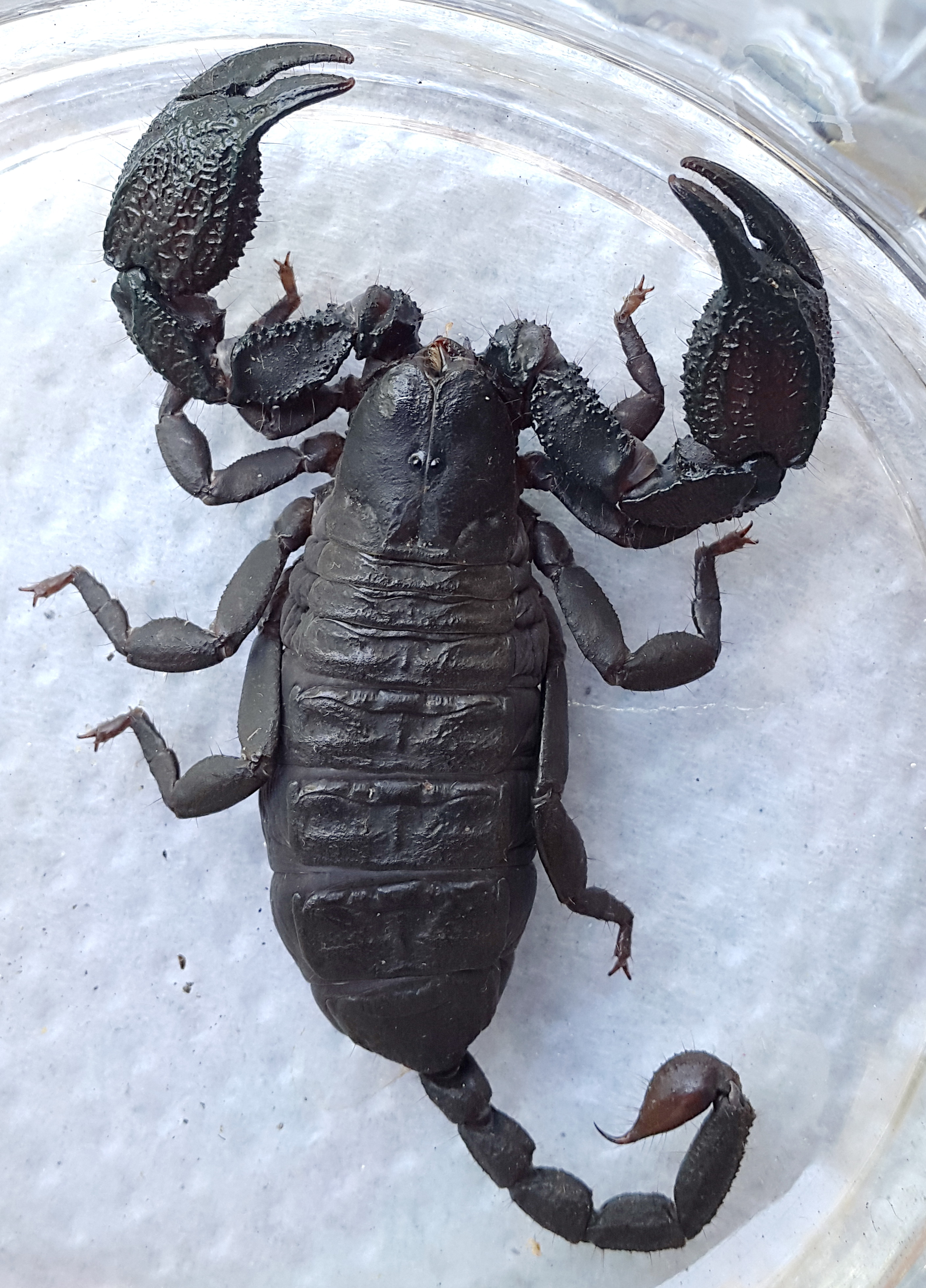

Scientific classification
- Kingdom: Animalia
- Phylum: Arthropoda
- Subphylum: Chelicerata
- Class: Arachnida
- Order: Scorpiones
- Family: Hormuridae
- Genus: Opisthacanthus
- Species: O. capensis

Binomial name
- Opisthacanthus capensis Thorell, 1876

Synonyms
- Opisthacanthus validus var. capensis Thorell, 1876; Opisthacanthus browni Hewitt, 1925; Opisthacanthus obscurus Kraepelin, 1911

= Opisthacanthus capensis =

Species of scorpion

Opisthacanthus capensis is a Cape Province and Zimbabwean species of scorpion with robust chelae, dark brown to black in colour, turning green when under cover for some time. Opisthacanthus scorpions are arboreal and ground-dwelling, and found mainly in moist habitats in dense vegetation, pine plantations and forests, and hiding under bark and rocks.

Its venom contains powerful neurotoxins and cytotoxins, including mucopolysaccharides, hyaluronidases, phospholipases, serotonins, histamines, enzyme inhibitors, and proteins such as neurotoxic peptides. The venom from O. capensis is largely composed of melittin which stimulates the release of the enzyme phospholipase A2 causing inflammation and pain. Phospholipase A2 cleaves the SN-2 acyl chain, releasing arachidonic acid. However, in humans, it's only mildly venomous, with his sting only causing local pain.

This species features in the diets of the bat-eared fox Otocyon megalotis (Canidae), the yellow mongoose Cynictis penicillata, the small grey mongoose Galerella pulverulenta, and the water mongoose Atilax paludinosus (Viverridae).
