= Kappa-KTx2.5 =

Toxin found in the venom of scorpions

κ-KTx2.5 is a toxin found in the venom of the scorpion, Opisthacanthus cayaporum. The toxin belongs to the κ-KTx family, a channel blocker family that targets voltage-gated potassium channels (Kv) 1.1 and 1.4.

== Etymology ==
The toxin κ-KTx2.5 is part of the κ-family of potassium-channel toxins (κ-KTxs), and was identified in the scorpion Opisthacanthus cayaporum. The first κ-KTx were isolated from the Scorpionidae Heterometrus fulvipes and systematically named κ-KTx1.n, being 'n' the order number in which they were found and described. Later, a second group of potassium channel toxins were isolated from another scorpium genus, Opisthacanthus, and called Om-toxins. The first ones found were from Opisthacanthus madagascariensis and named κ-KTx2.1 to κ-KTx2.4 .

κ-KTx2.5 is the mature peptide coded by the sequence OcyC8, which was isolated from Opisthacanthus cayaporum and named after the species (Ocy) and clone number (C8).

== Sources ==
κ-KTx2.5 is a toxin that is derived from the venom of Opisthacanthus cayaporum, also known as the South American scorpion. Scorpion is the main source of potassium-channel toxins among spiders, snakes, cone-snails, and sea anemones

== Chemistry ==
=== Structure ===
The κ-KTx2.5 toxin is a 28 amino acid long peptide with two disulfide bonds. The functional dyad (pair of amino acid residues that are involved in recognition and blocking of specific channels) of KTxs is composed of two amino acid residues, a lysine residue and an aromatic residue (tyrosine or phenylalanine).

By comparison, the κ-KTx2.5 possesses a valine residue in the position corresponding to tyrosine residue (the aromatic residue), and an arginine instead of the lysine residue. The peptide is similarly stabilized by two disulfide bonds.

The amino acid sequence of κ-KTx2.5 is: YDACVNACLEHHPNVRECEEACKNPVPP

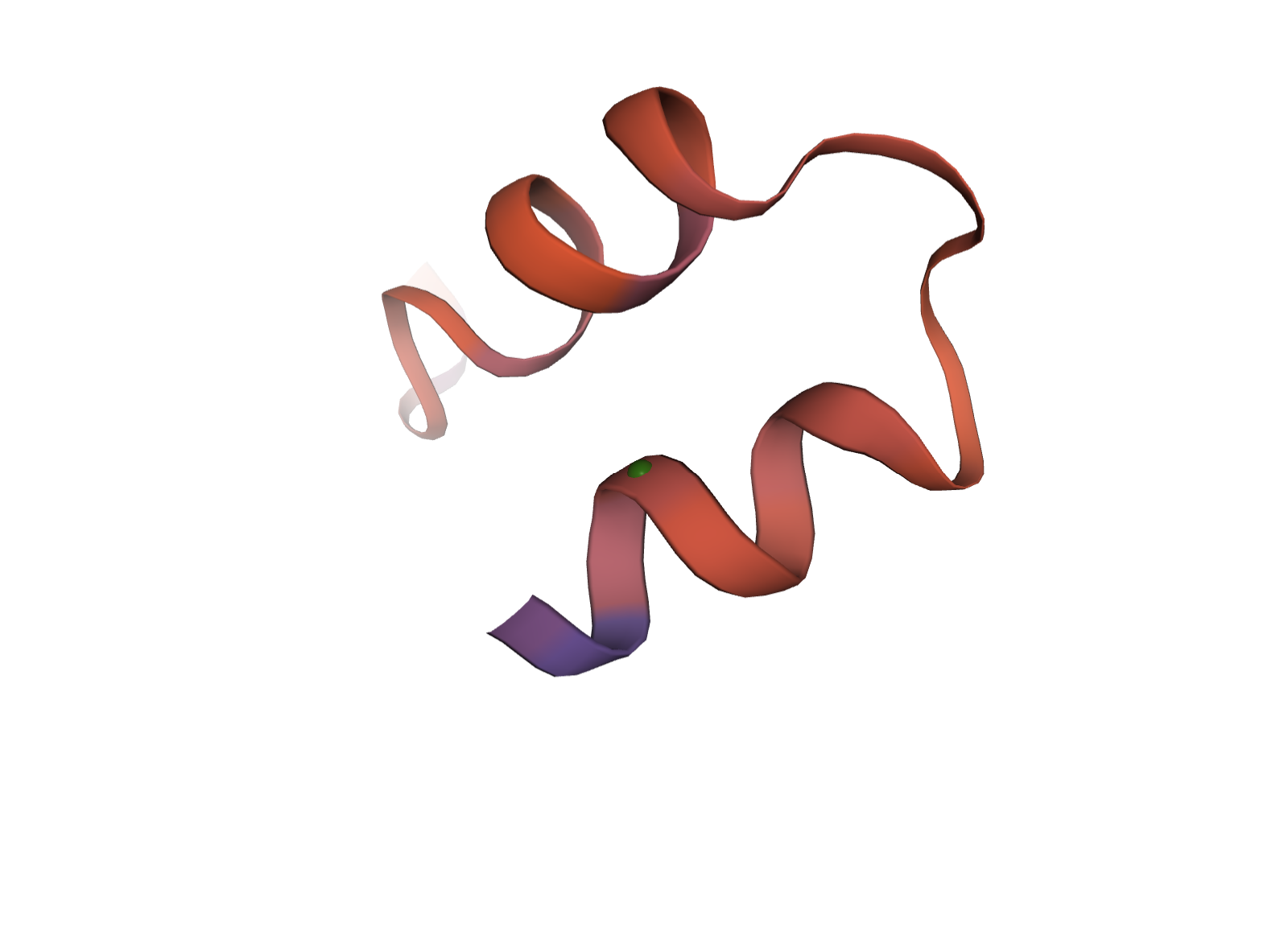
Predicted 3D Structure of Kappa-KTx2.5

=== Homology ===
In Basic Local Alignment Search Tool (BLAST), κ-KTx2.5 is shown to exhibit sequence homology with 4 other toxins and the calcium release-activated calcium channel protein 1 (with 28% identification). κ-KTx2.5 shows highest sequence identity (66.67%) with κ-KTx2.9, extracted from another species of scorpion, Pandinus imperator. Other toxins with sequence homology to κ-KTx2.5 are (Om-toxins) OmTx2, OmTx1, and OmTx3 with sequence identities of 64%, 64%, and 45.45%, respectively.

=== Family ===
The κ-KTx2.5 belongs to a potassium-channel blocker family KTx. Most peptides in KTxs family share common residues that facilitate binding with the potassium-channel vestibule. These peptides are formed by 20 to 95 amino acid residues and are stabilized by disulfide bonds.

κ-KTxs were classified as a separate family from the α, β, and γ families of KTxs, which were identified by their highly conserved secondary structures composed of an α helix and a β sheet (α/β). κ-KTxs differ in their structural arrangement from α, β, and γ-KTxs as their secondary structures are composed of two α-helices (α/α).

== Target ==
κ-KTx2.5 is capable of reversibly blocking voltage gated potassium channels (Kv), while it was shown to have no effect on voltage gated sodium channels (Nav). The toxins' main targets are Kv1.1 (IC50 = 46 μM) and Kv1.4 (IC50 = 71 μM), showing a low affinity for Kv channels overall. κ-KTx2.5 (at 16 μM) reduced potassium currents through Kv1.4 (by 50%) and Kv1.1 (by 20%).

== Mode of Action ==
κ-KTx2.5 binds potassium-channels through the interaction between the toxin’s C-terminal and the extracellular loop between transmembrane segments S5 and S6 of the potassium channel. On the level of amino acids, the asparagine-24 (N24) residue of κ-KTx2.5 interacts with aspartic acid-348 (D348) of Kv1.2 at a distance of 3.7 Å, affecting only one subunit.

Lysine-23 (K23) in the toxin likely aids in anchoring to the potassium-channel, with an interaction distance of 5.1 Å between the toxin K23 and channel D348. The introduction of a second κ-KTx2.5 toxin leads to interactions with other channel subunits, potentially blocking the channel pore through toxin-toxin interactions.
