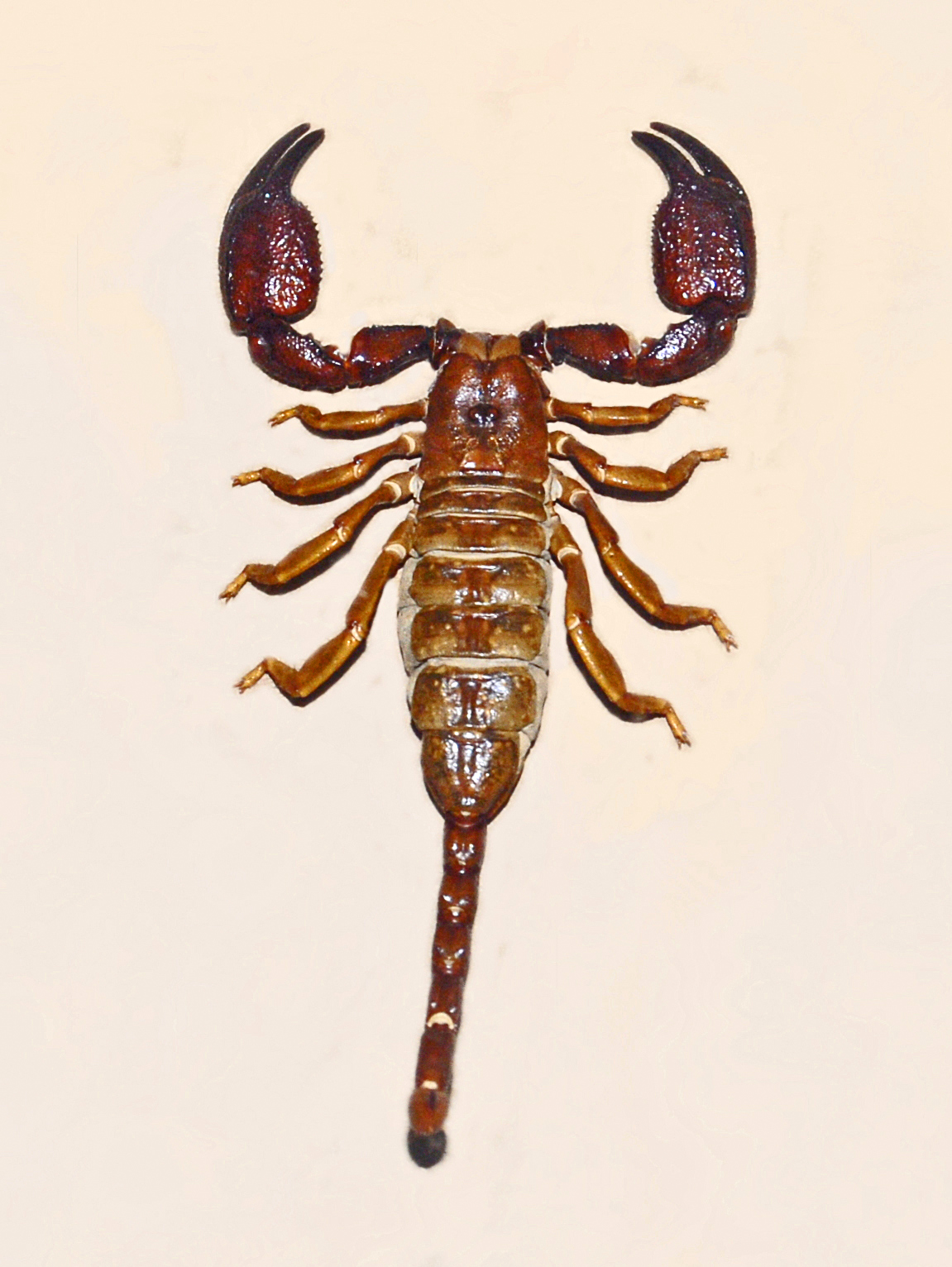
- Opisthacanthus africanus from the Democratic Republic of the Congo

Scientific classification
- Domain: Eukaryota
- Kingdom: Animalia
- Phylum: Arthropoda
- Subphylum: Chelicerata
- Class: Arachnida
- Order: Scorpiones
- Family: Hormuridae
- Genus: Opisthacanthus
- Species: O. africanus

Binomial name
- Opisthacanthus africanus Simon, 1876

Synonyms
- Scorpio septemdentatus Beauvois, 1805

= Opisthacanthus africanus =

Species of scorpion

Opisthacanthus africanus is a species of African scorpion.

== Distribution ==
This species can be found in the sub-Saharan Africa (Angola, Cameroon, Republic of Congo, Gabon, Guinea, Mozambique).

== Habitat ==
This species has an arboreal habit. It can be found in holes in tree trunks and in the spaces behind peeling barks. It is endemic to primary lowland rainforest at an elevation of 110 metres (360 ft) above sea level.
