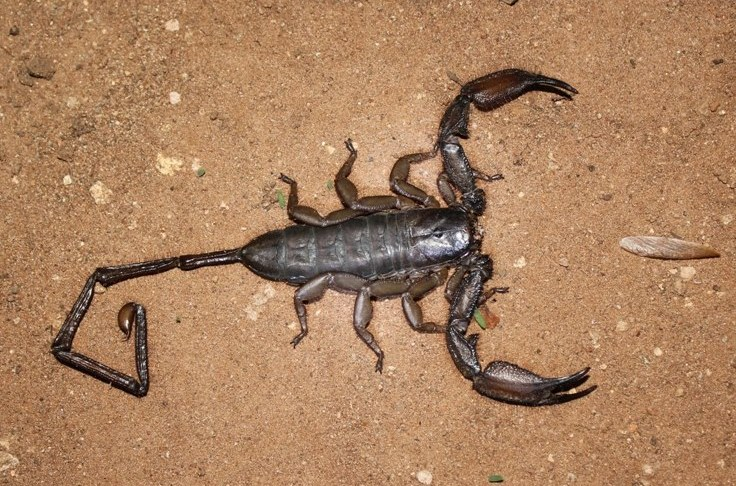

Scientific classification
- Kingdom: Animalia
- Phylum: Arthropoda
- Subphylum: Chelicerata
- Class: Arachnida
- Order: Scorpiones
- Family: Hormuridae
- Genus: Hadogenes
- Species: H. troglodytes

Binomial name
- Hadogenes troglodytes (Peters, 1861)

= Hadogenes troglodytes =

Species of scorpion

Hadogenes troglodytes is a species of scorpion from southern Africa. It is commonly known as the flat rock scorpion and commonly sold on the exotic pet market. It was once regarded as having the longest recorded body length of any scorpion, reaching up to 20 cm; however Heterometrus swammerdami currently holds the record for being the world's largest scorpion at 9 inches (23 cm) in length. May be confused with Hadogenes bicolor.

== Distribution ==
It is known from the Limpopo province, reaching the northern parts of the Mpumalanga provinces. It occurs up into Botswana, Zimbabwe, and western Mozambique.

== Description ==
The overall body appearance is consistent with other members of Hadogenes. The carapace, pedipalps, chela, sternites, and metasoma are all flattened allowing them to maneuver in and out of the small cracks and crevices that are abundant in the rocky outcrops they are endemic to.

Characterized by highly specialized curved telotarsal claws which allows then to move quickly within their environment, but hinders their locomotion on looser substratum such as sand.

The carapace, pedipalps, and metasoma are all black while the legs and chela are pale to yellow. The metasoma and stinger are comparatively small when contrasted against other similarly sized scorpion species.

== Habitat ==
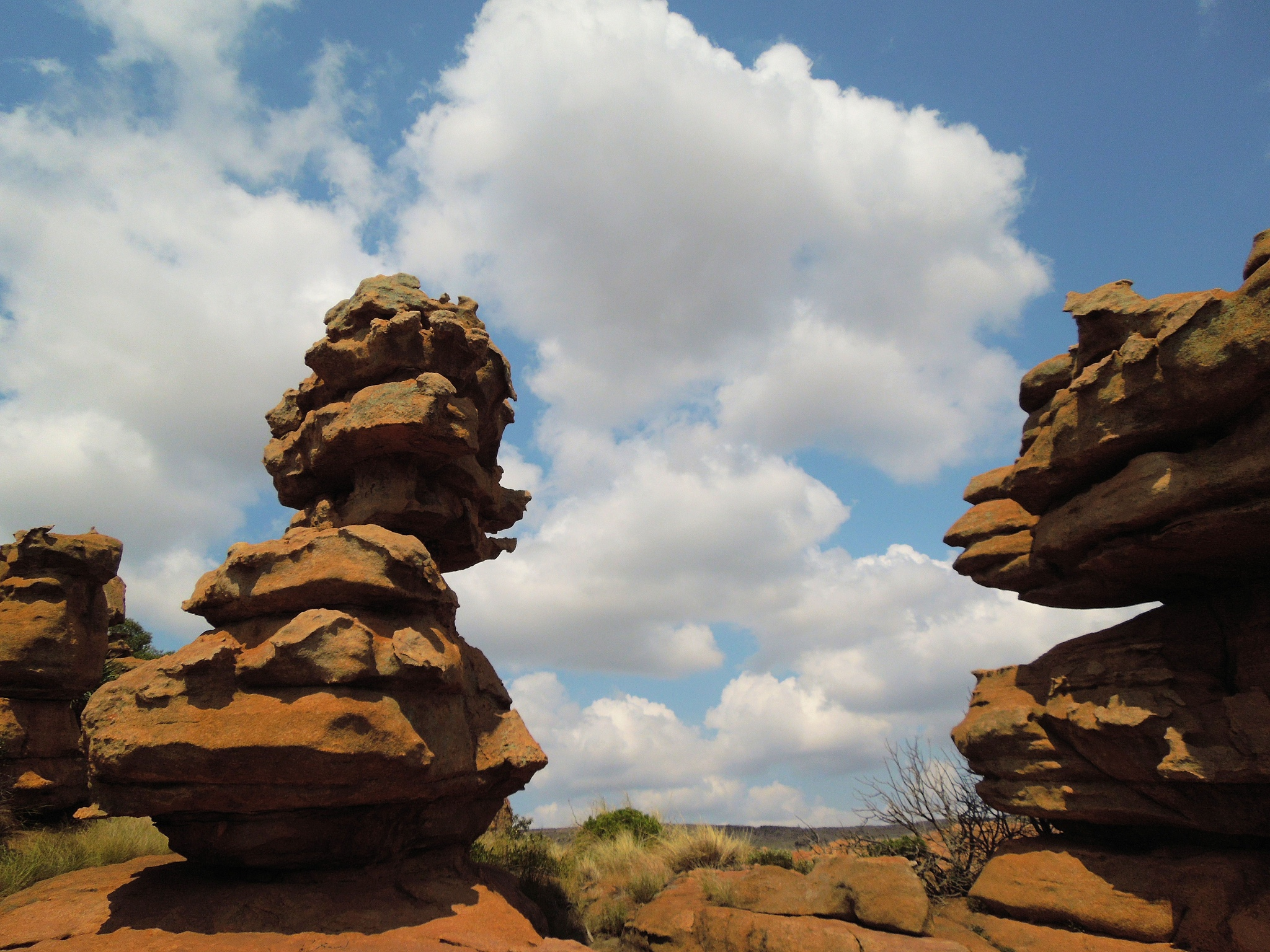
Hadogenes troglodytes habitat

Troglodytes thrives in a slightly humid rocky environment. The ideal troglodytes habitat has plenty of cracks and crevices available. This species remains highly localized tending to moving up and down one rocky outcrop for their entire lives. Troglodytes is unable to travel for extended periods of time across the sand and will die of exposure. Troglodytes is threatened by habitat loss due to mining.

== Behavior ==
Troglodytes is very reclusive and is likely to remain unseen unless their hiding place is disturbed. This species of scorpion will generally sting as a last defense and will try to flee before fighting. Nocturnal hunter, preferring to leave its hiding spots when it is cooler, predates on insects up to its own body size.

This species is quite adapt at burrowing and can quickly excavate the soil and gravel from beneath a stone ledge to create a new den. A troglodytes will use its tail to assist in its burrowing by using it to sweep the dirt away.

Highly territorial and will fight to the death with other members of its species when kept in close captivity together. Species demonstrates cannibalism.

== Venom ==
Very mild venom, pain lasting only several minutes. LD50 values are reported between 1800 and 2667 mg/kg. May prove medically valuable for use on ion channel-associated diseases and infections caused by antibiotic-resistant pathogens. Demonstrating 121 novel venom peptides under transcriptomic analysis.

== See also ==
- Hadogenes bicolor
