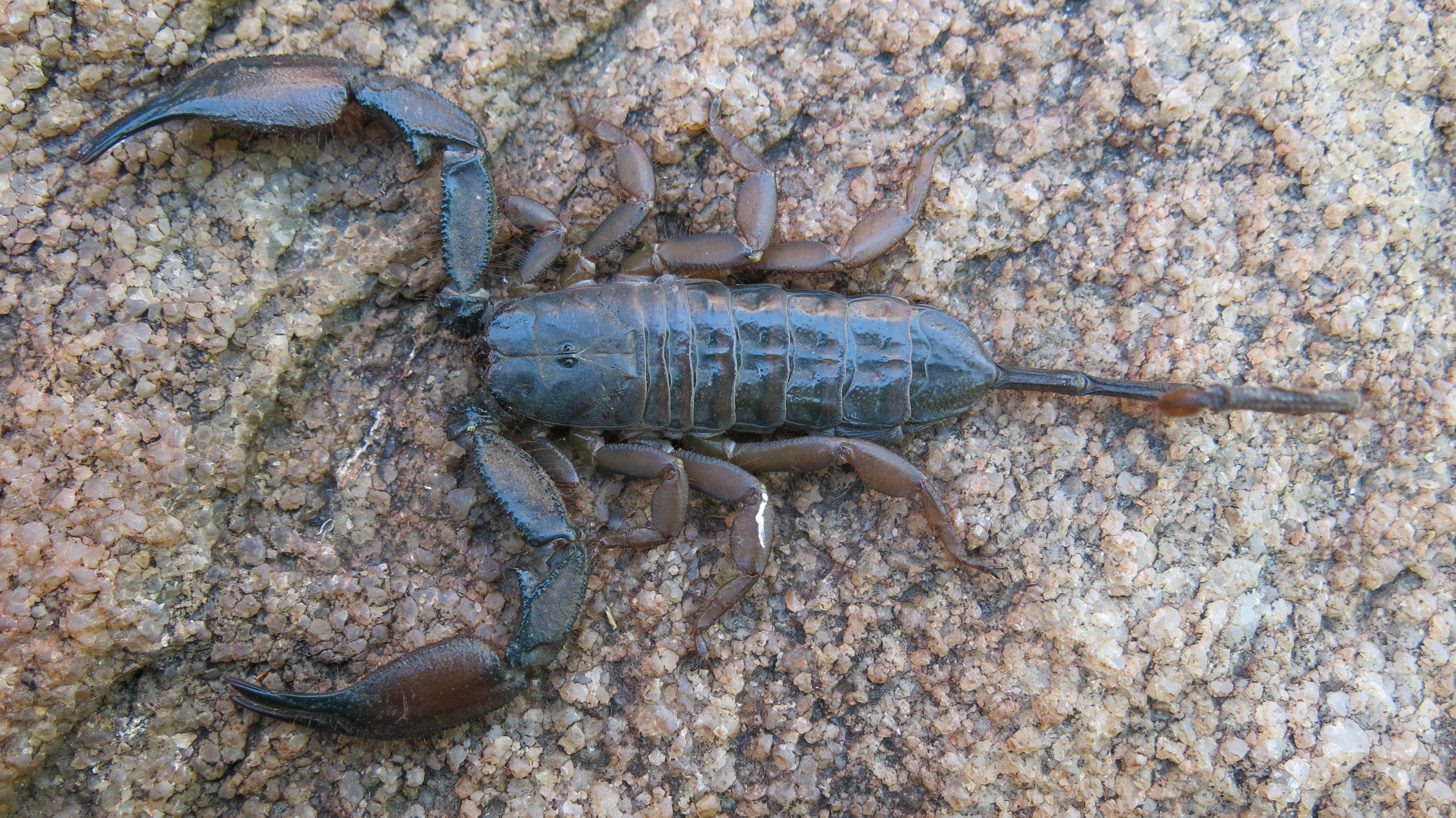

Scientific classification
- Domain: Eukaryota
- Kingdom: Animalia
- Phylum: Arthropoda
- Subphylum: Chelicerata
- Class: Arachnida
- Order: Scorpiones
- Family: Hormuridae
- Genus: Hadogenes
- Species: H. gracilis

Binomial name
- Hadogenes gracilis (Hewitt, 1909)

= Hadogenes gracilis =

Species of scorpion

Hadogenes gracilis commonly known as the fine rock scorpion is a species of scorpion in the family Hormuridae. This species is quite small when compared against other members of Hadogenes.

== Description ==
This species is of the typical rock scorpion appearance which is overall quite flat, this adaptation allows them to easily maneuver into various cracks and crevices without catching portions of their carapace on the rocks. The pedipalps and the carapace are dark brown to black and the legs are lightly colored in comparison.

== Distribution ==
Restricted to the Magaliesberg mountain range and the surrounding rocky outcrops in South Africa. Threatened by habitat loss due to mining.
