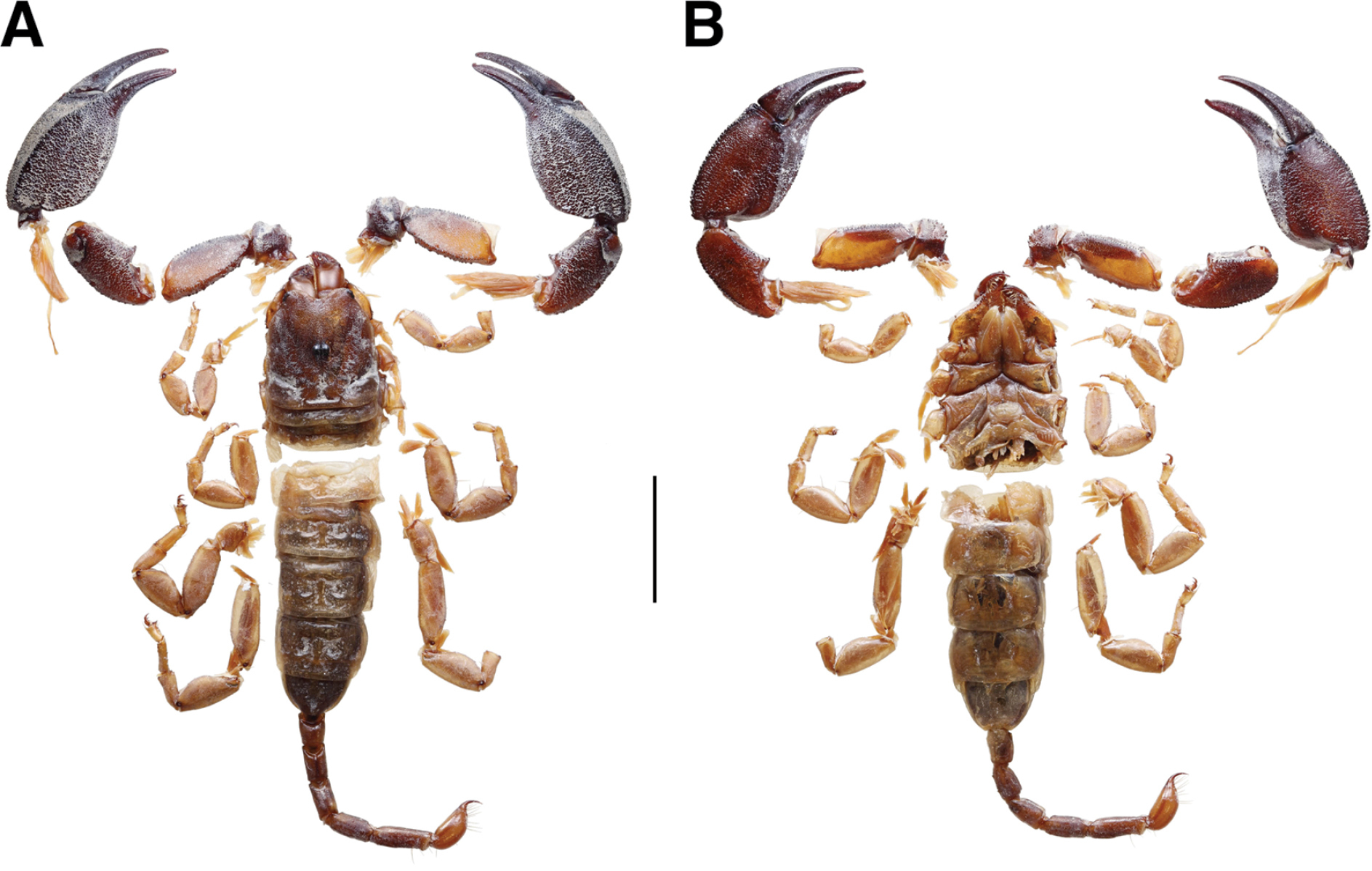

Scientific classification
- Kingdom: Animalia
- Phylum: Arthropoda
- Subphylum: Chelicerata
- Class: Arachnida
- Order: Scorpiones
- Family: Hormuridae
- Genus: Hormurus
- Species: H. boholiensis

Binomial name
- Hormurus boholiensis (Kraepelin, 1914)

Synonyms
- Liocheles boholiensis Kraepelin, 1914

= Hormurus boholiensis =

Species of scorpion

Hormurus boholiensis is a species of scorpion in the Hormuridae family. It is endemic to the Philippines. It was first described in 1914 by German naturalist Karl Kraepelin.
