= Hormurus penta =

Scientific classification
- Kingdom: Animalia
- Phylum: Arthropoda
- Subphylum: Chelicerata
- Class: Arachnida
- Order: Scorpiones
- Family: Hormuridae
- Genus: Hormurus
- Species: H. penta

Binomial name
- Hormurus penta (Francke and Lourenço, 1991)

Synonyms
- Liocheles penta Francke and Lourenço, 1991

Species of scorpion

Hormurus penta is a species of scorpion in the Hormuridae family. It is native to New Guinea and the Solomon Islands. It was first described in 1991.
