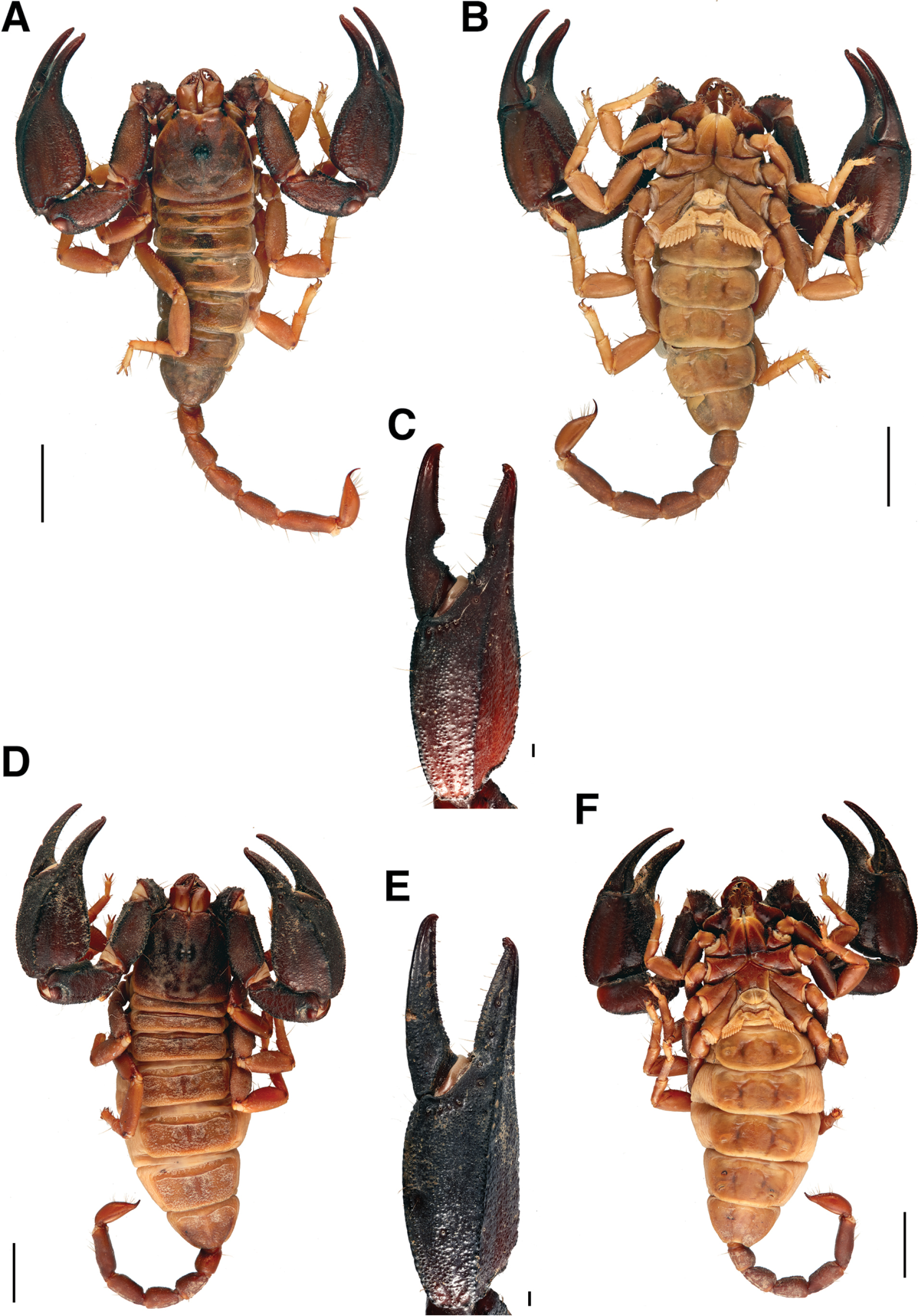

Scientific classification
- Kingdom: Animalia
- Phylum: Arthropoda
- Subphylum: Chelicerata
- Class: Arachnida
- Order: Scorpiones
- Family: Hormuridae
- Genus: Hormurus
- Species: H. neocaledonicus

Binomial name
- Hormurus neocaledonicus (Simon, 1877)

Synonyms
- Liocheles neocaledonicus Simon, 1877

= Hormurus neocaledonicus =

Species of scorpion

Hormurus boholiensis is a species of scorpion in the Hormuridae family. It is endemic to New Caledonia. It was first described in 1877 by French naturalist Eugène Simon.
