= Hormurus ischnoryctes =

Scientific classification
- Kingdom: Animalia
- Phylum: Arthropoda
- Subphylum: Chelicerata
- Class: Arachnida
- Order: Scorpiones
- Family: Hormuridae
- Genus: Hormurus
- Species: H. ischnoryctes

Binomial name
- Hormurus ischnoryctes Monod & Prendini, 2013

Species of scorpion

Hormurus ischnoryctes is a species of scorpion in the Hormuridae family. It is native to Australia, where it has only been found in north-eastern Queensland. It was first described in 2013.

== Etymology ==
The specific epithet ischnoryctes comes from the Greek ischnos (‘lean’ or ‘thin’) and oryktes (‘digger’), with reference to the slender pincers of the male.

== Description ==
The species grows up to about 60 mm in length. Colouration is orange- to reddish-brown to dark brown. The pincers of the female are slightly shorter and more robust than those of the male.

== Distribution and habitat ==
Specimens of the species were collected near Mount Mulligan, west of Mareeba and the Atherton Tableland, in savanna woodland containing patches of vine thicket, at the base of the large sandstone Ngarrabullgan mesa which provides orographic moisture to its surrounds.

== Behaviour ==
The scorpions dig vertical burrows up to 30 cm deep, with a terminal chamber and slit entrance. They also shelter in rock crevices and beneath stones in the vicinity of creeks and pools.
