= Hadogenes gunningi =

Scientific classification
- Domain: Eukaryota
- Kingdom: Animalia
- Phylum: Arthropoda
- Subphylum: Chelicerata
- Class: Arachnida
- Order: Scorpiones
- Family: Hormuridae
- Genus: Hadogenes
- Species: H. gunningi

Binomial name
- Hadogenes gunningi Purcell, 1899

Species of arachnid

Hadogenes gunningi, commonly known as Gunning's rock scorpion or rotsskerpioen in Afrikaans, is a small species of scorpion of the genus Hadogenes. It is found in southern Africa, particularly the province of Gauteng. The venom of the members of the genus Hadogenes has been compared to a nettle sting and will often results in an itch for roughly two minutes.

== Description ==
A smaller member of Hadogenes, sized at around 7 cm with the telson extended. The overall appearance is consistent with other African flat rock scorpions. The flattened carapace, pedipalps, and telson allow this species to quickly maneuver into the rock crevices that should be readily found within their ideal environments. The coloration is somewhat interesting when compared against other members of Hadogenes with the carapace being generally one overall shade of black, the legs being a lighter color, and being overall covered in a fine red setae giving it a somewhat tinted look.

== Habitat ==
Along with most other members of Hadogenes, gunningi's ideal environment is a slightly humid rocky outcrop with plenty of tight hiding placing that it can wedge itself into. This species is threatened by habitat loss due to localized mining operations in the regions that it's endemic to.
