= Hormurus litodactylus =

Scientific classification
- Kingdom: Animalia
- Phylum: Arthropoda
- Subphylum: Chelicerata
- Class: Arachnida
- Order: Scorpiones
- Family: Hormuridae
- Genus: Hormurus
- Species: H. litodactylus

Binomial name
- Hormurus litodactylus (Monod & Volschenk, 2004)

Synonyms
- Liocheles litodactylus Monod & Volschenk, 2004

Species of scorpion

Hormurus litodactylus is a species of scorpion in the Hormuridae family. It is native to Australia, where it occurs in the Wet Tropics of Far North Queensland. It was first described in 2004.

== Etymology ==
The specific epithet litodactylus comes from the Greek litos (‘plain’) and daktylos (‘finger’), with reference to the lack of certain sculptural features on the pincers of the males.

== Description ==
The holotype specimen is 46.5 mm in length. Colouration is mostly tan brown, with some darker brown markings.

== Distribution and habitat ==
The scorpion has only been recorded from the Thornton Uplands north of Mossman, in high altitude rainforest above an elevation of 700 m. The species may be restricted to the Thornton massif, which has an area of less than 1,000 km^{2}.
