= Hormurus macrochela =

Scientific classification
- Kingdom: Animalia
- Phylum: Arthropoda
- Subphylum: Chelicerata
- Class: Arachnida
- Order: Scorpiones
- Family: Hormuridae
- Genus: Hormurus
- Species: H. macrochela

Binomial name
- Hormurus macrochela Monod, 2013

Species of scorpion

Hormurus macrochela is a species of scorpion in the Hormuridae family. It is native to Australia, where it occurs in north-eastern Queensland. It was first described in 2013.

== Etymology ==
The specific epithet macrochela comes from the Greek makos (‘long’) and chele (‘claw’), with reference to the extremely long pincers of the male.

== Description ==
The species grows up to about 70 mm in length. Colouration is orange to dark brown to black. The pincers of the female are shorter and more robust than those of the male.

== Distribution and habitat ==
The species has been recorded from three islands off the north-eastern Queensland coast between Ingham and Townsville. The scorpions were found in narrow rock crevices and between stones near creeks in rainforest and vine forest.
