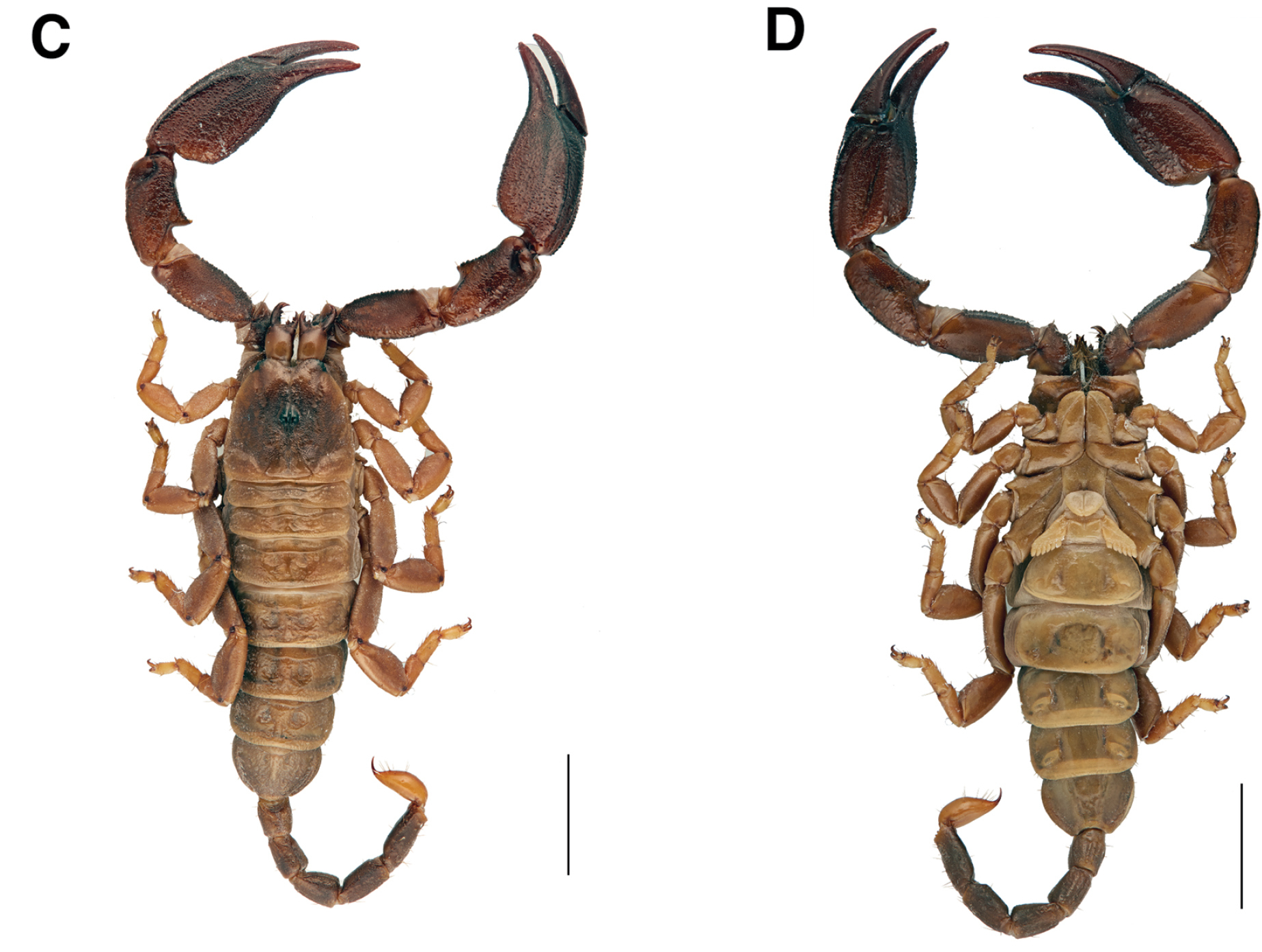

Scientific classification
- Kingdom: Animalia
- Phylum: Arthropoda
- Subphylum: Chelicerata
- Class: Arachnida
- Order: Scorpiones
- Family: Hormuridae
- Genus: Hormurus
- Species: H. waigiensis

Binomial name
- Hormurus waigiensis (Gervais, 1844)

Synonyms
- Scorpio (Ischnurus) waigiensis Gervais, 1844; Liocheles waigiensis (Gervais, 1844); Ischnurus caudicula L.Koch, 1867; Ischnurus neocaledonicus Simon, 1877; Ischnurus dechangei Becker, 1880; Hormurus insculptus Thorell, 1888; Hormurus weberi Pocock, 1893; Hormurus sarasini Kraepelin, 1914; Hormurus caudicula novaeguineae Giltay, 1931

= Hormurus waigiensis =

Species of scorpion

Hormurus waigiensis, also known as the Australian rainforest scorpion, is a species of scorpion in the Hormuridae family. It is native to Australia and New Guinea. It was first described in 1844 by French paleontologist and zoologist Paul Gervais.

== Description ==
The scorpions can grow to about 65 mm (2.6 in) in length. They have elongated and flattened bodies and powerful pincers.

== Distribution and habitat ==
Much of the species’ recorded range in Australia is in eastern Queensland, with some additional records from New South Wales, the Northern Territory, northern Western Australia, and New Guinea. As their common name suggests, the scorpions prefer warm, humid environments. Their body shape is adapted to sheltering in rock crevices and beneath decaying bark and plant litter.

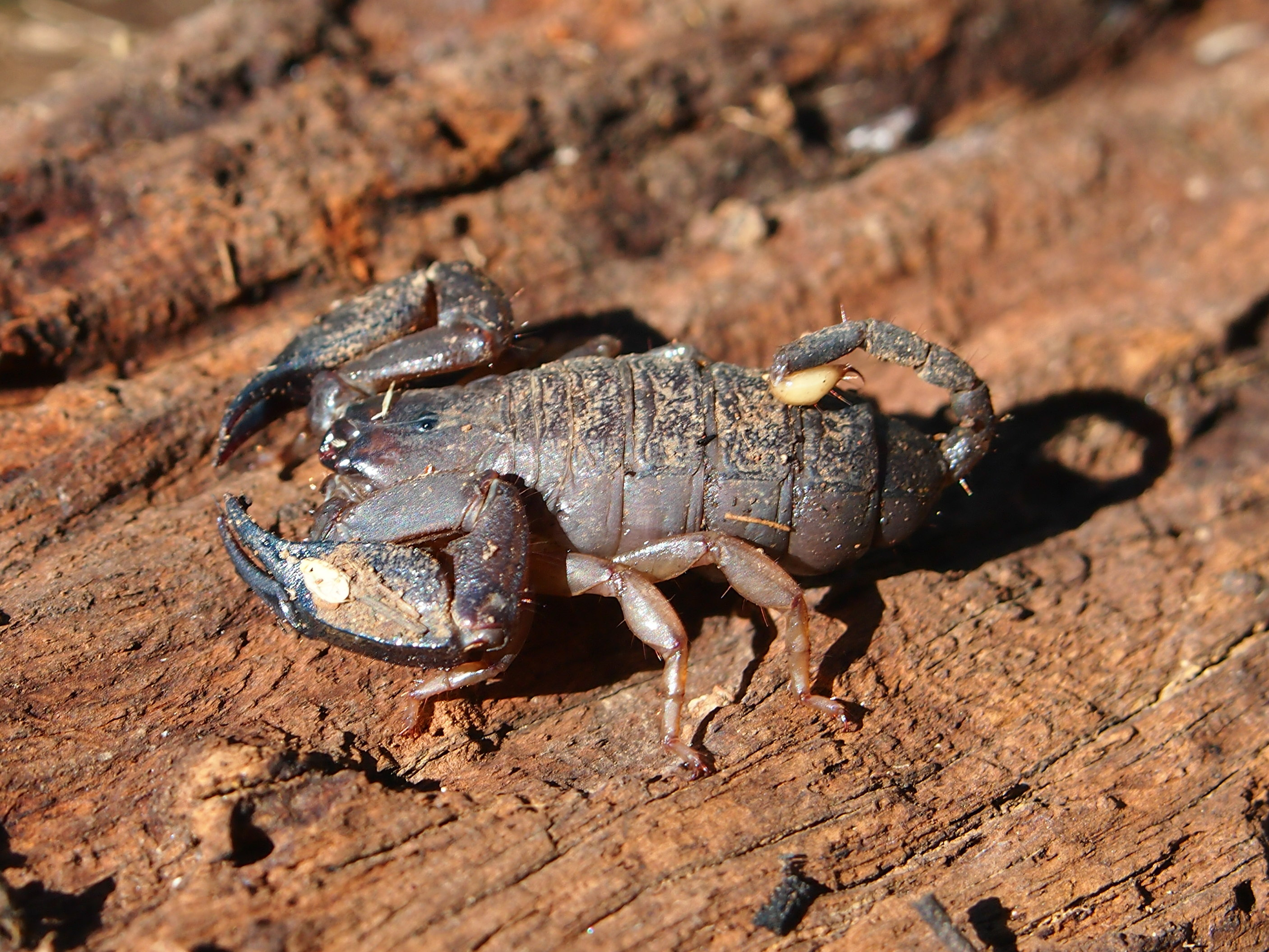
