= Hormurus polisorum =

Scientific classification
- Kingdom: Animalia
- Phylum: Arthropoda
- Subphylum: Chelicerata
- Class: Arachnida
- Order: Scorpiones
- Family: Hormuridae
- Genus: Hormurus
- Species: H. polisorum

Binomial name
- Hormurus polisorum (Volschenk, Locket & Harvey, 2001)

Synonyms
- Liocheles polisorum Volschenk, Locket & Harvey, 2001

Species of scorpion

Hormurus polisorum, also known as the Christmas Island cave scorpion, is a species of troglobitic scorpion in the Hormuridae family. It is endemic to Australia’s Christmas Island in the eastern Indian Ocean. It was first described in 2001; at the time of its discovery, it was the first troglobitic scorpion species recorded for Australia, and the second outside the Americas. The scorpions are rare, blind, obligate cave-dwellers, and are restricted to only a few caves on Christmas Island.
