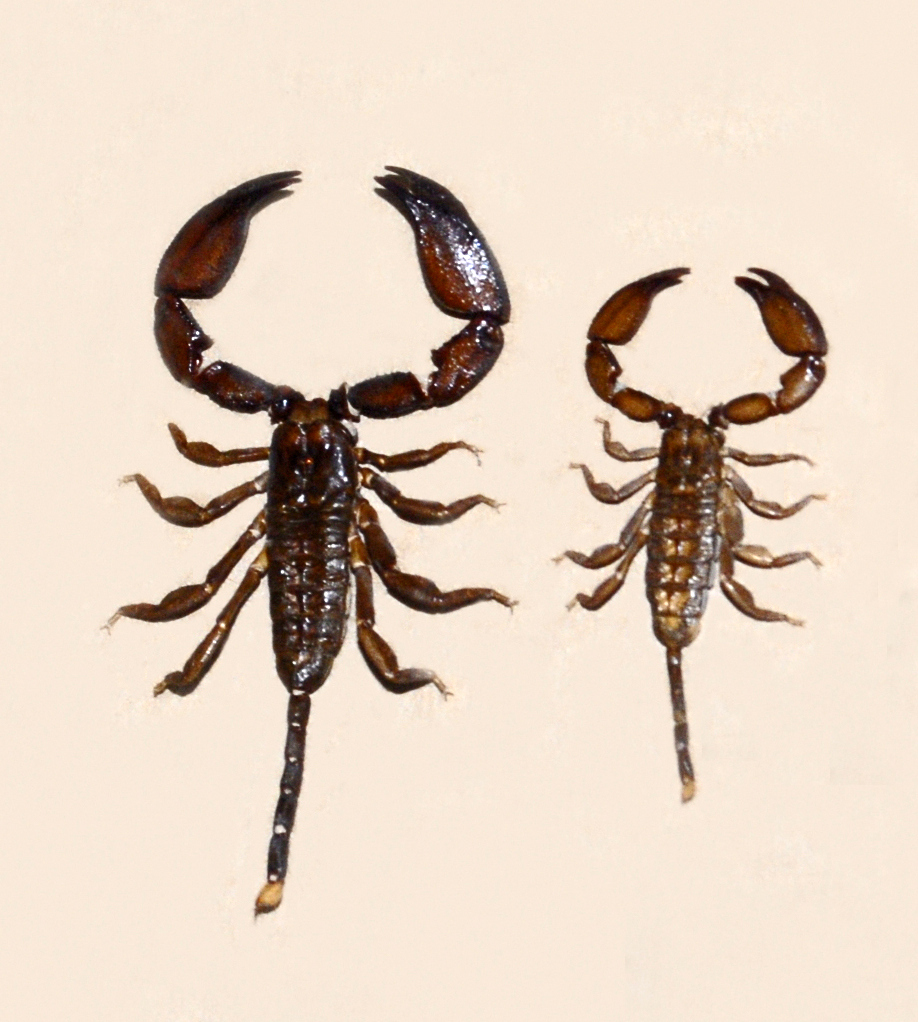
- Liocheles australasiae

Scientific classification
- Domain: Eukaryota
- Kingdom: Animalia
- Phylum: Arthropoda
- Subphylum: Chelicerata
- Class: Arachnida
- Order: Scorpiones
- Family: Hormuridae
- Genus: Liocheles; Sundevall, 1833

Synonyms
- Hormurus Thorell, 1876; Ischnurus C.L. Koch, 1838

= Liocheles =

Genus of scorpions

Liocheles is a genus of scorpions belonging to the family Hormuridae.

== Species ==
The following species are recognised in the genus Liocheles:

- Liocheles australasiae (Fabricius, 1775)
- Liocheles longimanus (Werner, 1939)
- Liocheles nigripes (Pocock, 1897)
- Liocheles oranghutan Ythier & Richard, 2020
- Liocheles schalleri Mirza, 2017
