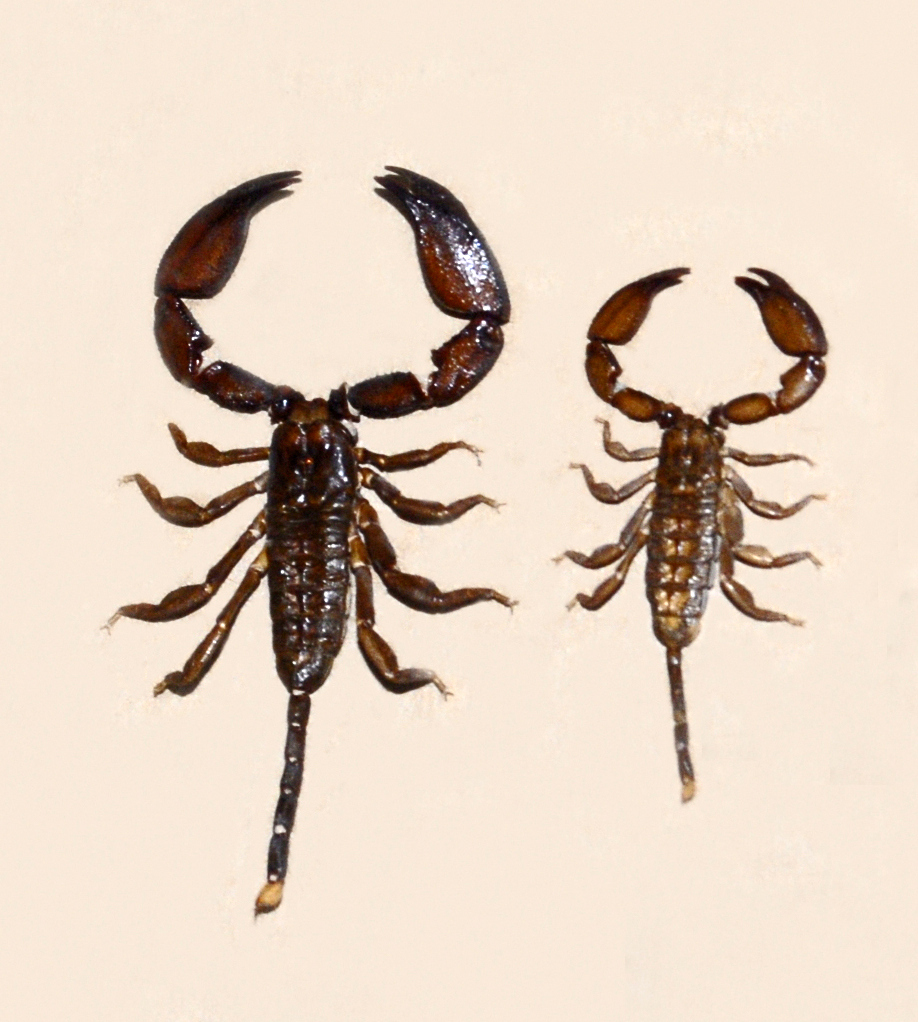
- Liocheles australasiae from Enggano Island. Museum specimens

Scientific classification
- Domain: Eukaryota
- Kingdom: Animalia
- Phylum: Arthropoda
- Subphylum: Chelicerata
- Class: Arachnida
- Order: Scorpiones
- Family: Hormuridae
- Genus: Liocheles
- Species: L. australasiae

Binomial name
- Liocheles australasiae (Fabricius, 1775)

Synonyms
- Buthus brevicaudatus Rainbow, 1897; Hormurus australasiae suspectus Thorell, 1888; Hormurus boholiensis Kraepelin, 1914; Ischnurus complanatus C.L. Koch, 1838; Ischnurus pistaceus Simon, 1877; Scorpio australasiae Fabricius, 1775; Scorpio cumingii Gervais, 1844; Scorpio gracilicauda Guérin-Meneville, 1843

= Liocheles australasiae =

Species of scorpion

Liocheles australasiae, the dwarf wood scorpion, is a species of scorpion belonging to the family Hormuridae.

== Distribution ==
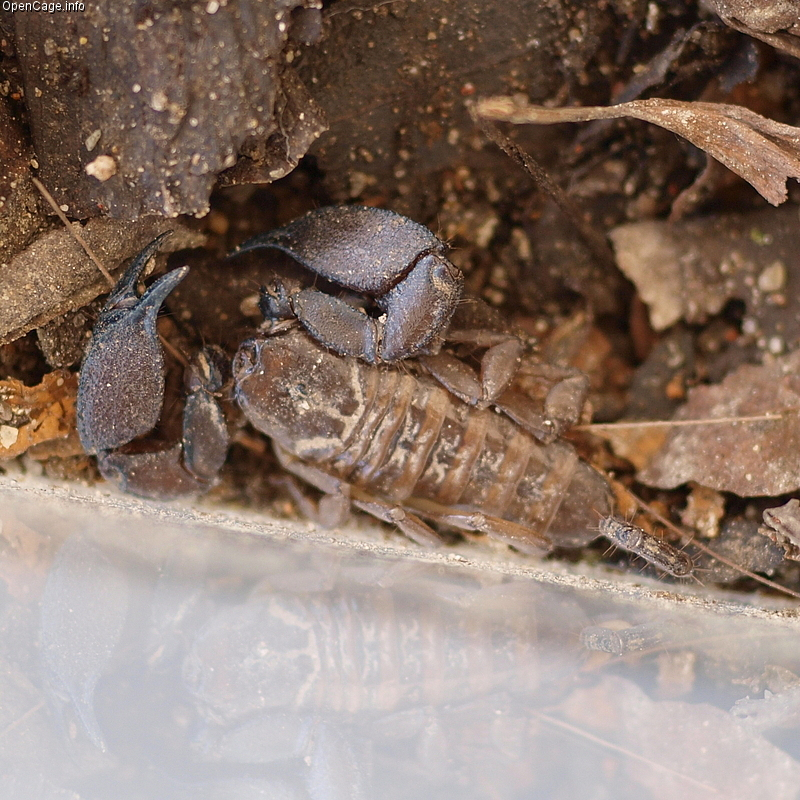
A live individual of Liocheles australasiae

This species is present in India, Sri Lanka, Bangladesh, Yaeyama Islands (Japan), China, Thailand, Vietnam, Malaysia, Philippines, Taiwan, Mariana Islands, Indonesia, Australia, Papua New Guinea, Solomon Islands, New Caledonia, Fiji, Tonga, Samoa and French Polynesia.

== Description ==
This small scorpion has the total length of 22 to 36 mm.

Most of the populations are parthenogenetic, meaning they can produce young without males.

== Bibliography ==
- Yamazaki K, Yahata H, Kobayashi N, Makioka T. Egg maturation and parthenogenetic recovery of diploidy in the scorpion Liocheles australasiae (Fabricius) (Scorpions, ischnuridae).
- TOSHIKI MAKIOKA Reproductive biology of the viviparous scorpion, Liocheles australasiae (Fabricius) (Arachnida, Scorpiones, Ischnuridae) IV. Pregnancy in females isolated from infancy, with notes on juvenile stage duration
- Fabricius, 1775 : Systema entomologiae, sistens insectorum classes, ordines, genera, species, adiectis, synonymis, locis descriptionibus observationibus. Flensburg and Lipsiae.
- Monod, 2011 : Taxonomic emendations in the genus Liocheles Sundevall, 1833 (Scorpiones, Liochelidae). Revue suisse de Zoologie, vol. 118, no 4, p. 723-758.

== See also ==
- Lesser brown scorpion
