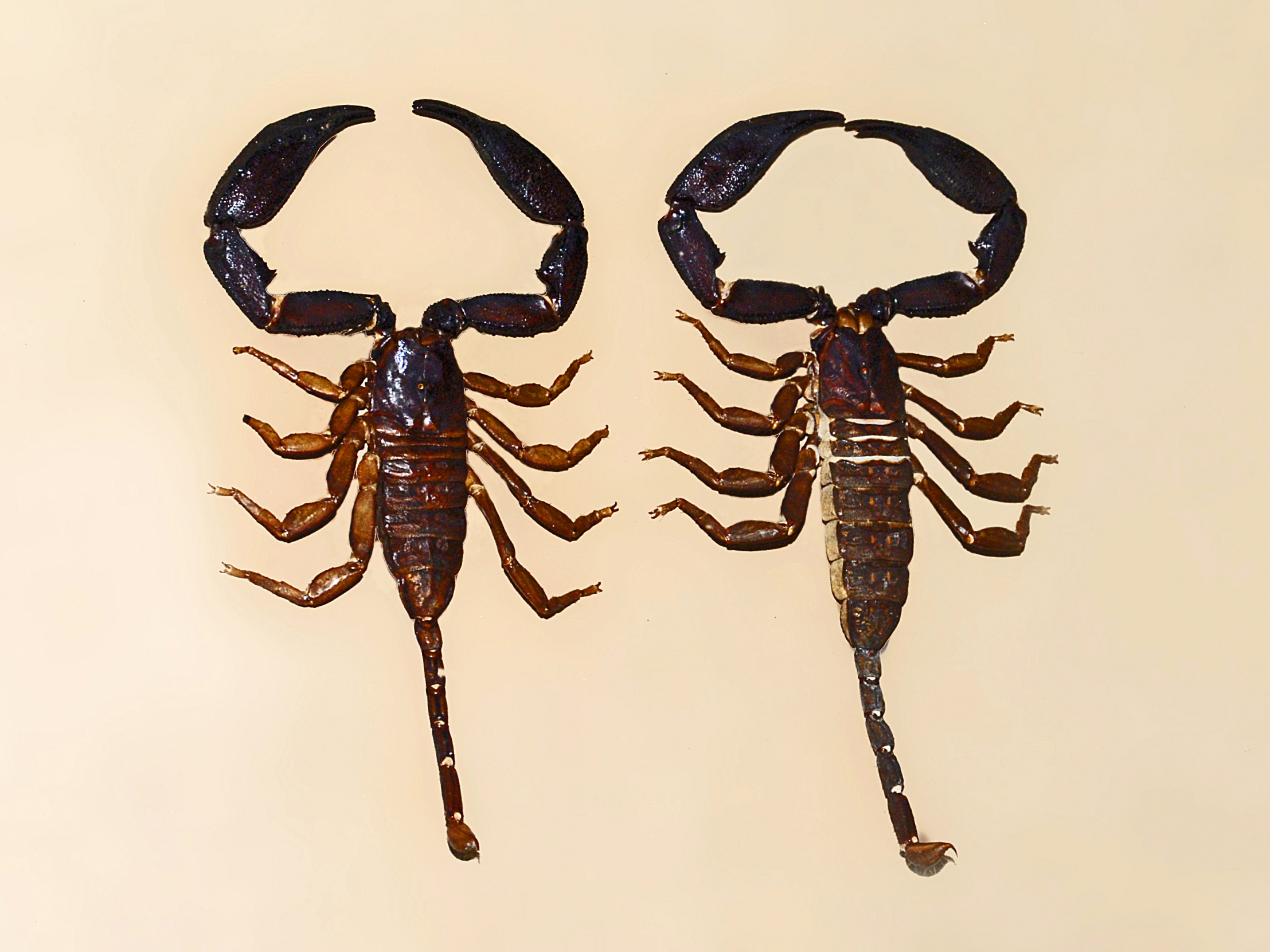
- From New Guinea

Scientific classification
- Kingdom: Animalia
- Phylum: Arthropoda
- Subphylum: Chelicerata
- Class: Arachnida
- Order: Scorpiones
- Family: Hormuridae
- Genus: Hormurus
- Species: H. karschii

Binomial name
- Hormurus karschii Keyserling, 1885

Synonyms
- Liocheles karschii Keyserling, 1885; Hormurus papuanus Kraepelin, 1914

= Hormurus karschii =

Species of scorpion

Hormurus karschii is a species of scorpion belonging to the family Hormuridae.

== Description ==
Hormurus karschii can reach a length of about 80 millimetres (3.1 in). Carapace is brown or dark brown, while tergites, legs, ventral surface and sternites are yellowish brown. Some specimens may be blackish brown or almost completely black.

== Distribution ==
This species is present in Australia (Queensland) and New Guinea.

== Habitat ==
These scorpions can be found in the primeval rainforest at an elevation of 300–400 metres (980–1,310 ft) above sea level.
