= Hormurus ochyroscapter =

Scientific classification
- Kingdom: Animalia
- Phylum: Arthropoda
- Subphylum: Chelicerata
- Class: Arachnida
- Order: Scorpiones
- Family: Hormuridae
- Genus: Hormurus
- Species: H. ochyroscapter

Binomial name
- Hormurus ochyroscapter Monod, 2013

Species of scorpion

Hormurus ochyroscapter is a species of scorpion in the Hormuridae family. It is native to Australia, where it occurs in north-eastern Queensland. It was first described in 2013.

== Etymology ==
The specific epithet ochyroscapter comes from the Greek ochyros (‘strong’) and skapter (‘digger’), with reference to the robust pincers of the species.

== Description ==
The holotype specimen is 47 mm in length. Colouration varies over the body from pale yellow to reddish-brown to dark brown to black.

== Distribution and habitat ==
The species has been recorded from the Charters Towers region and the Shire of Etheridge in Far North Queensland in open woodland and savanna.
