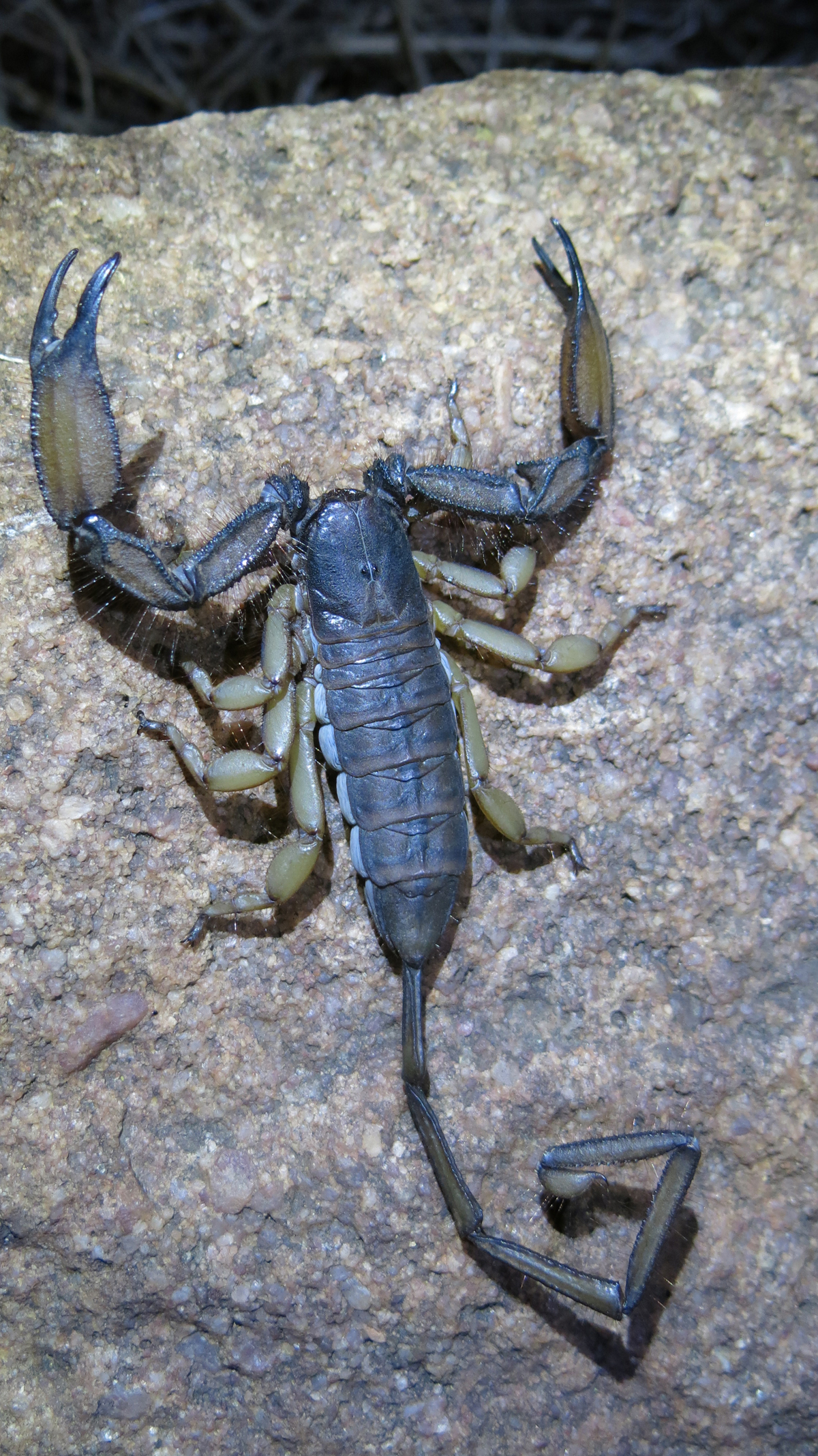
- Hadogenes troglodytes in Soutpansberg, South Africa

Scientific classification
- Domain: Eukaryota
- Kingdom: Animalia
- Phylum: Arthropoda
- Subphylum: Chelicerata
- Class: Arachnida
- Order: Scorpiones
- Family: Hormuridae
- Genus: Hadogenes; Kraepelin, 1894

Diversity
- 18 species (see text)

= Hadogenes =

Genus of scorpions

Hadogenes is a genus of African scorpions (including the world's longest, Hadogenes troglodytes). This genus is distinguished by its members which have an unusually flat overall appearance that allows them to quickly get in and out of the cracks and cervices that are generally abundant in their rocky habitats. Occurring in South Africa, Namibia, Botswana, Zimbabwe and Mozambique. Members of the genus also have special claws on their tarsus which allows them specialized maneuverability in their environments. The members of this genus have demonstrated an inability to travel across the sand and will perish in the heat when unable to find shelter for extended periods of time. The members of this genus are threatened by habitat loss due to mining as well and by poaching for the exotic pet trade.

== Members ==
- Hadogenes bicolor Purcell, 1899
- Hadogenes gracilis Hewitt, 1909
- Hadogenes granulatus Purcell, 1901
- Hadogenes gunningi Purcell, 1899
- Hadogenes hahni Peters, 1862
- Hadogenes lawrencei Newlands, 1972
- Hadogenes longimanus Prendini, 2001
- Hadogenes minor Purcell, 1899
- Hadogenes newlandsi Prendini, 2001
- Hadogenes paucidens Pocock, 1896
- Hadogenes phyllodes Thorell, 1876
- Hadogenes polytrichobothrius Prendini, 2006
- Hadogenes soutpansbergensis Prendini, 2006
- Hadogenes tityrus Simon, 1888
- Hadogenes trichiurus Gervais, 1843
- Hadogenes troglodytes Peters, 1861
- Hadogenes zuluanus Lawrence, 1937
- Hadogenes zumpti Newlands & Cantrell, 1985
