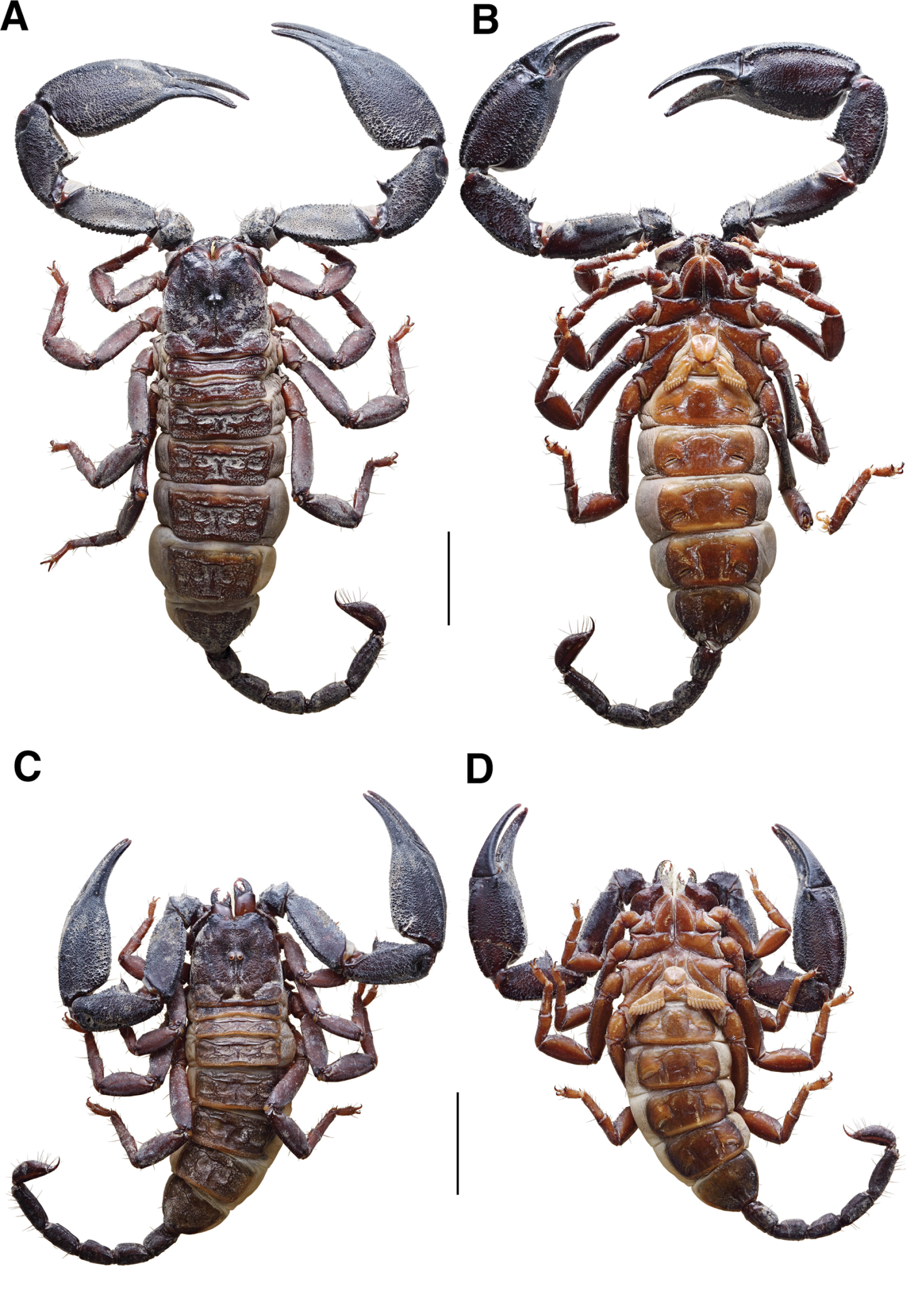
- Hormurus karschii

Scientific classification
- Kingdom: Animalia
- Phylum: Arthropoda
- Subphylum: Chelicerata
- Class: Arachnida
- Order: Scorpiones
- Family: Hormuridae
- Genus: Hormurus; Thorell, 1876

= Hormurus =

Genus of scorpions

Hormurus is a genus of scorpions, commonly known as rainforest scorpions, in the family Hormuridae, that occur in rainforest habitats, mainly in Australia and Melanesia. The genus was first described by Swedish arachnologist Tamerlan Thorell in 1876.

== Species ==
Species include:

- Hormurus boholiensis Kraepelin, 1914 - Philippines
- Hormurus ischnoryctes Monod & Prendini, 2013 - Australia
- Hormurus karschii Keyserling, 1885 - Australia and New Guinea
- Hormurus litodactylus (Monod & Volschenk, 2004) - Australia
- Hormurus longimanus (Locket, 1995) - Australia
- Hormurus macrochela Monod, 2013 - Australia
- Hormurus neocaledonicus (Simon, 1877) - New Caledonia
- Hormurus ochyroscapter Monod, 2013 - Australia
- Hormurus penta (Francke & Lourenco, 1991) - New Guinea and Solomon Islands
- Hormurus polisorum (Volschenk, Locket & Harvey, 2001) - Christmas Island
- Hormurus waigiensis (Gervais, 1943) - Australia and New Guinea
