= Hadogenes bicolor =

Scientific classification
- Domain: Eukaryota
- Kingdom: Animalia
- Phylum: Arthropoda
- Subphylum: Chelicerata
- Class: Arachnida
- Order: Scorpiones
- Family: Hormuridae
- Genus: Hadogenes
- Species: H. bicolor

Binomial name
- Hadogenes bicolor Purcell, 1899

Species of scorpion

Hadogenes bicolor is a species of scorpion endemic to South Africa. This species is often confused with H. troglodytes.

== Description ==
The legs, tail and chelicerae of H. bicolor are paler than the carapace, forming a marked color contrast. The overall appearance is consistent with that of the other members of Hadogenes, the body construction is flattened which allows them to navigate safely in and out the cracks and crevices that comprise their habitats.

== Distribution and ecology ==
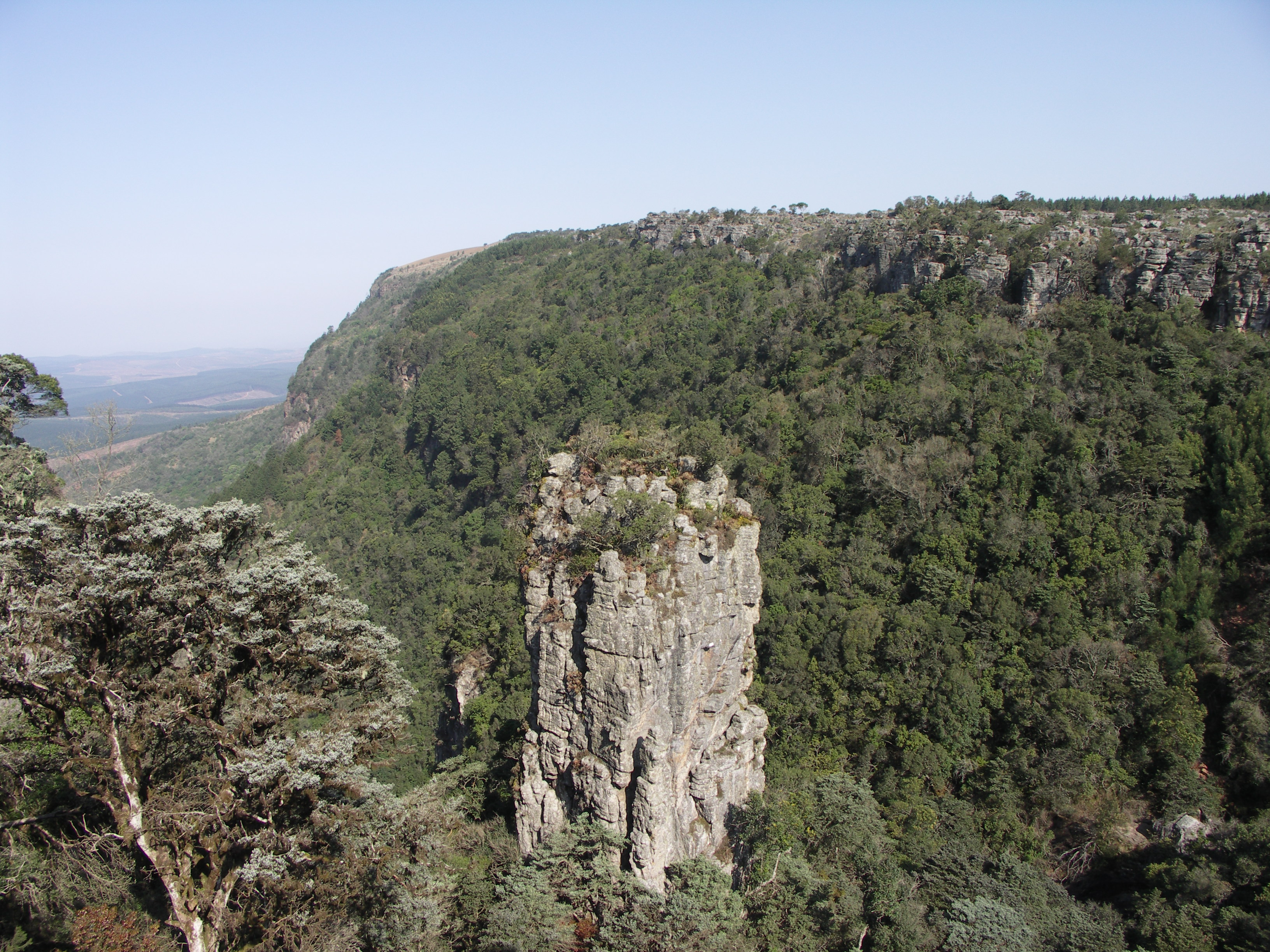
The Drakensberg Escarpment in Mpumulanga

Hadogenes bicolor is endemic to Mpumalanga and Limpopo provinces, South Africa. It lives only in rocky outcrops along the Drakensberg escarpment at altitudes of 1,200–2,000 metres (3,900–6,600 ft). It lives in crevices in dolerite and granite rocks in areas with an annual rainfall of 600–1,100 millimetres (24–43 in).

== Taxonomy ==
Hadogenes bicolor was first described by W. F. Purcell in 1899, based on material collected by the Reverend J. W. Daneel "about twenty miles east of Pietersburg [now Polokwane], Zoutpansberg Distr., Transvaal". The name Hadogenes bicolor has previously been used to cover animals now recognised as three separate species, H. bicolor, H. longimanus and H. newlandsi. Many of the scorpions sold in the pet trade as H. bicolor are actually H. troglodytes.
