= Hormurus longimanus =

Scientific classification
- Kingdom: Animalia
- Phylum: Arthropoda
- Subphylum: Chelicerata
- Class: Arachnida
- Order: Scorpiones
- Family: Hormuridae
- Genus: Hormurus
- Species: H. longimanus

Binomial name
- Hormurus longimanus Locket, 1995

Synonyms
- Liocheles longimanus Locket, 1995; Liocheles extensa Locket, 1997

Species of scorpion

Hormurus longimanus is a species of scorpion in the Hormuridae family. It is native to Australia, where it occurs in the tropical Top End of the Northern Territory. It was first described in 1995.

== Distribution and habitat ==
The species is restricted to dry monsoon forests along the western edge of the deeply dissected escarpment of the Arnhem Land plateau, where aquifers fed by wet season orographic rainfall maintain permanent pools through the dry season.
