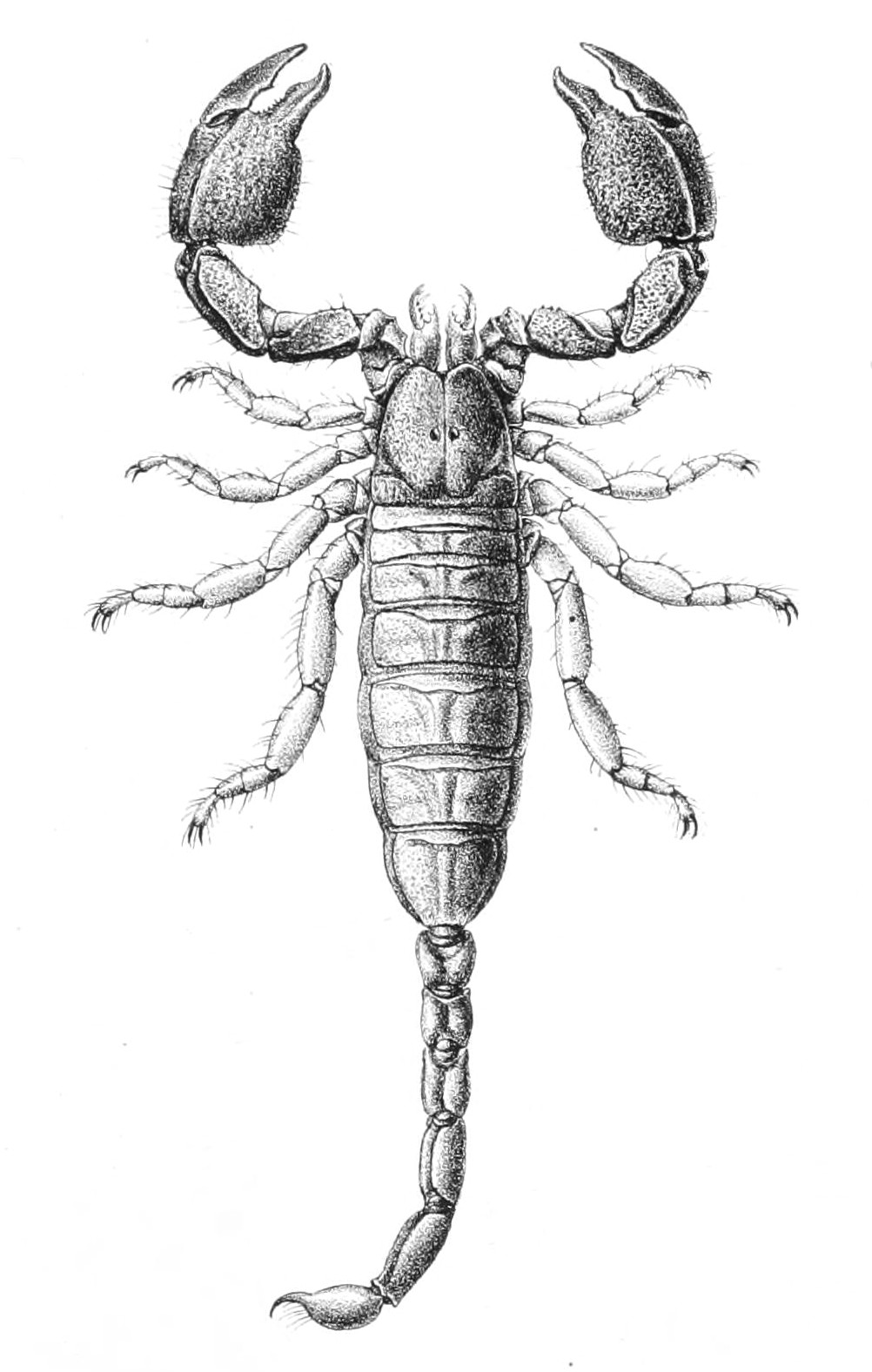
- Cheloctonus jonesii

Scientific classification
- Domain: Eukaryota
- Kingdom: Animalia
- Phylum: Arthropoda
- Subphylum: Chelicerata
- Class: Arachnida
- Order: Scorpiones
- Family: Hormuridae
- Genus: Cheloctonus; Pocock, 1892

= Cheloctonus =

Genus of scorpions

Cheloctonus is a genus of scorpions in the family Hormuridae. Scorpions in this genus are not believed to be medically significant.

== Species ==
- Cheloctonus anthracinus Pocock, 1899
- Cheloctonus crassimanus (Pocock, 1896)
- Cheloctonus glaber Kraepelin, 1896
- Cheloctonus intermedius Hewitt, 1912
- Cheloctonus jonesii Pocock, 1892
