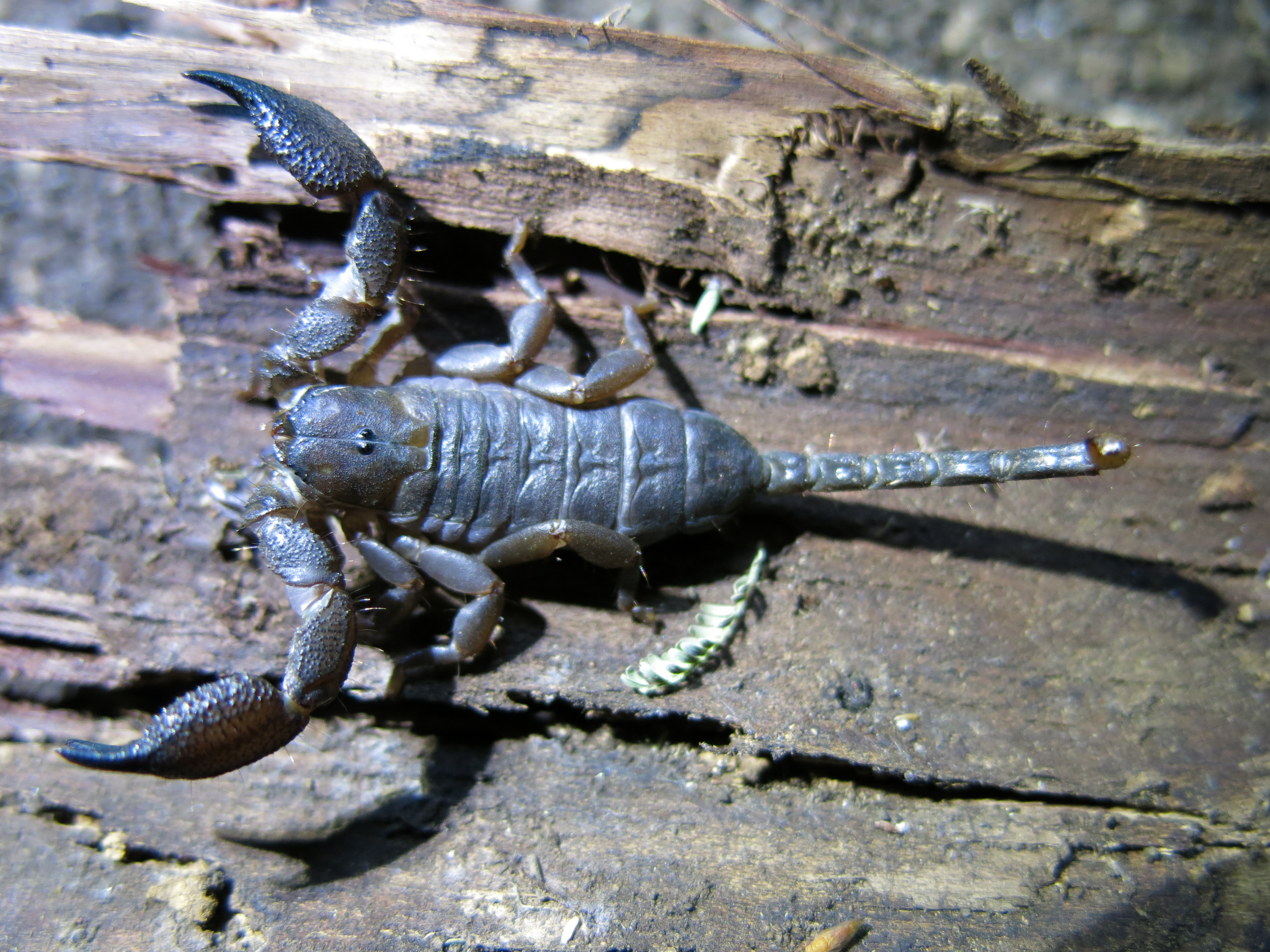
- Opisthacanthus asper, South Africa

Scientific classification
- Kingdom: Animalia
- Phylum: Arthropoda
- Subphylum: Chelicerata
- Class: Arachnida
- Order: Scorpiones
- Family: Hormuridae
- Genus: Opisthacanthus; Peters, 1861

= Opisthacanthus =

Genus of scorpions

Opisthacanthus is a genus of scorpions in the family Hormuridae occurring in Central and South America, the Caribbean, Africa and Madagascar.

== Species ==
The following species are recognised in the genus Opisthacanthus:

- Opisthacanthus africanus Simon, 1876
- Opisthacanthus ambanja Lourenço, 2014
- Opisthacanthus andohahela Lourenço, 2014
- Opisthacanthus antsiranana Lourenço, 2014
- Opisthacanthus asper (Peters, 1861)
- Opisthacanthus autanensis Gonzalez-Sponga, 2004
- Opisthacanthus basutus Lawrence, 1955)
- Opisthacanthus borboremai Lourenço & Fe, 2003
- Opisthacanthus brevicauda Rojas-Runjaic, Borges & Armas, 2008
- Opisthacanthus capensis Thorell, 1876
- Opisthacanthus cayaporum Vellard, 1932
- Opisthacanthus daraisensis Lourenço, 2006
- Opisthacanthus diremptus (Karsch, 1879)
- Opisthacanthus elatus (Gervais, 1843)
- Opisthacanthus faillei Lourenço & Wilme, 2019
- Opisthacanthus heurtaultae Lourenço, 1980
- Opisthacanthus laevipes (Pocock, 1893)
- Opisthacanthus lamorali Lourenço, 1981
- Opisthacanthus lavasoa Lourenço, Wilme & Waeber, 2016
- Opisthacanthus lecomtei (Lucas, 1858)
- Opisthacanthus lepturus (Beauvois, 1805)
- Opisthacanthus lourencoi Ythier, 2022
- Opisthacanthus lucienneae Lourenço, 2006
- Opisthacanthus maculatus Lourenço, 2006
- Opisthacanthus madagascariensis Kraepelin, 1894
- Opisthacanthus milloti Lourenço & Goodman, 2008
- Opisthacanthus pauliani Lourenço & Goodman, 2008
- Opisthacanthus piceus Lourenço, 2006
- Opisthacanthus piscatorius Lawrence, 1955
- Opisthacanthus rugiceps Pocock, 1897
- Opisthacanthus rugulosus Pocock, 1896
- Opisthacanthus surinamensis Lourenço, 2017
- Opisthacanthus titanus Lourenço, Wilme & Waeber 2018
- Opisthacanthus valerioi Lourenço, 1980
- Opisthacanthus validus (Thorell, 1876
- Opisthacanthus weyrauchi Mello-Leitão, 1948

== Current systematics ==
Subgenus Opisthacanthus Peters, 1861
I. cayaporum group

- Opisthacanthus cayaporum Vellard, 1932
- Opisthacanthus heurtaultae Lourenço, 1980
- Opisthacanthus weyrauchi Mello-Leitão, 1948

II. lepturus group

- Opisthacanthus lepturus (Beauvois, 1805)
- Opisthacanthus elatus (Gervais, 1844)
- Opisthacanthus valerioi Lourenço, 1980
- Opisthacanthus borboremai sp. n.

III. lecomtei group

- Opisthacanthus lecomtei (Lucas, 1858)

Subgenus Nepabellus Francke, 1974
I. africanus group

- Opisthacanthus africanus africanus Simon, 1876
- Opisthacanthus africanus pallidus Lourenço, 2003
- Opisthacanthus capensis Thorell, 1876
- Opisthacanthus diremptus (Karsch, 1879)

II. asper group

- Opisthacanthus asper (Peters, 1861)
- Opisthacanthus basutus Lawrence, 1955
- Opisthacanthus rugiceps Pocock, 1897

III. laevipes group

- Opisthacanthus laevipes (Pocock, 1893)

IV. rugulosus group

- Opisthacanthus lamorali Lourenço, 1981
- Opisthacanthus rugulosus Pocock, 1896

V. validus group

- Opisthacanthus piscatorius Lawrence, 1955
- Opisthacanthus validus Thorell, 1876

Subgenus Monodopisthacanthus Lourenço, 2001
I. madagascariensis group

- Opisthacanthus madagascariensis Kraepelin, 1894
- Opisthacanthus punctulatus Pocock, 1896
