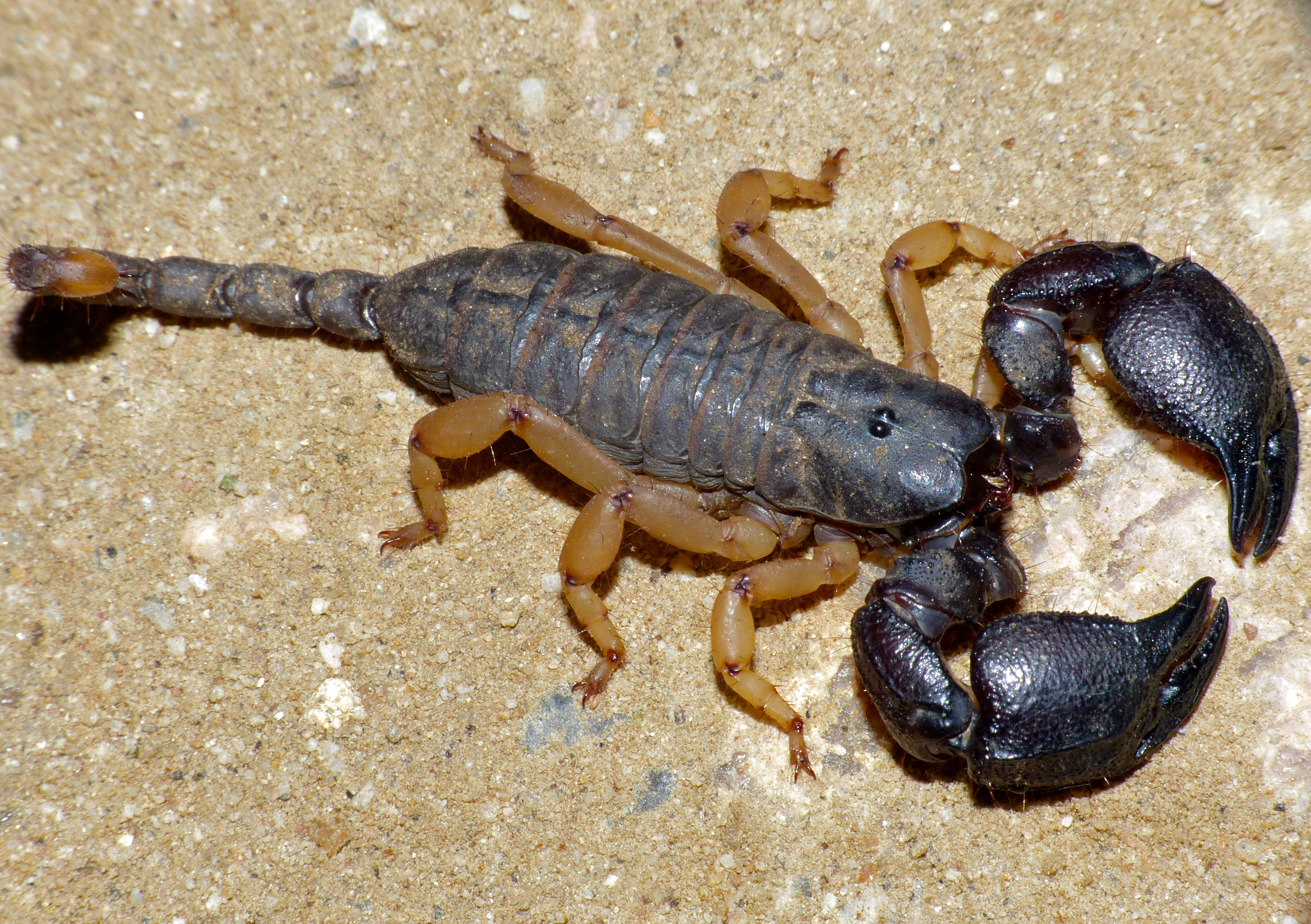
- Yellow-legged tree scorpion (Opisthacanthus asper)

Scientific classification
- Domain: Eukaryota
- Kingdom: Animalia
- Phylum: Arthropoda
- Subphylum: Chelicerata
- Class: Arachnida
- Order: Scorpiones
- Superfamily: Scorpionoidea
- Family: Hormuridae; Laurie, 1896

= Hormuridae =

Family of scorpions

Hormuridae is a family of scorpions in the order Scorpiones. There are about 10 genera and more than 90 described species in Hormuridae.

== Genera ==
These 11 genera belong to the family Hormuridae:

- Cheloctonus Pocock, 1892
- Chiromachetes Pocock, 1899
- Chiromachus Pocock, 1893
- Hadogenes Kraepelin, 1894
- Hormiops Fage, 1933
- Hormurus Thorell, 1876
- Iomachus Pocock, 1893
- Liocheles Sundevall, 1833
- Opisthacanthus Peters, 1861
- Palaeocheloctonus Lourenço, 1996
- Tibetiomachus Lourenço & Qi, 2006
