= Jan Cilliers Park =

Urban park in Pretoria, South Africa

Coordinates: 25°46′42″S 28°13′27″E

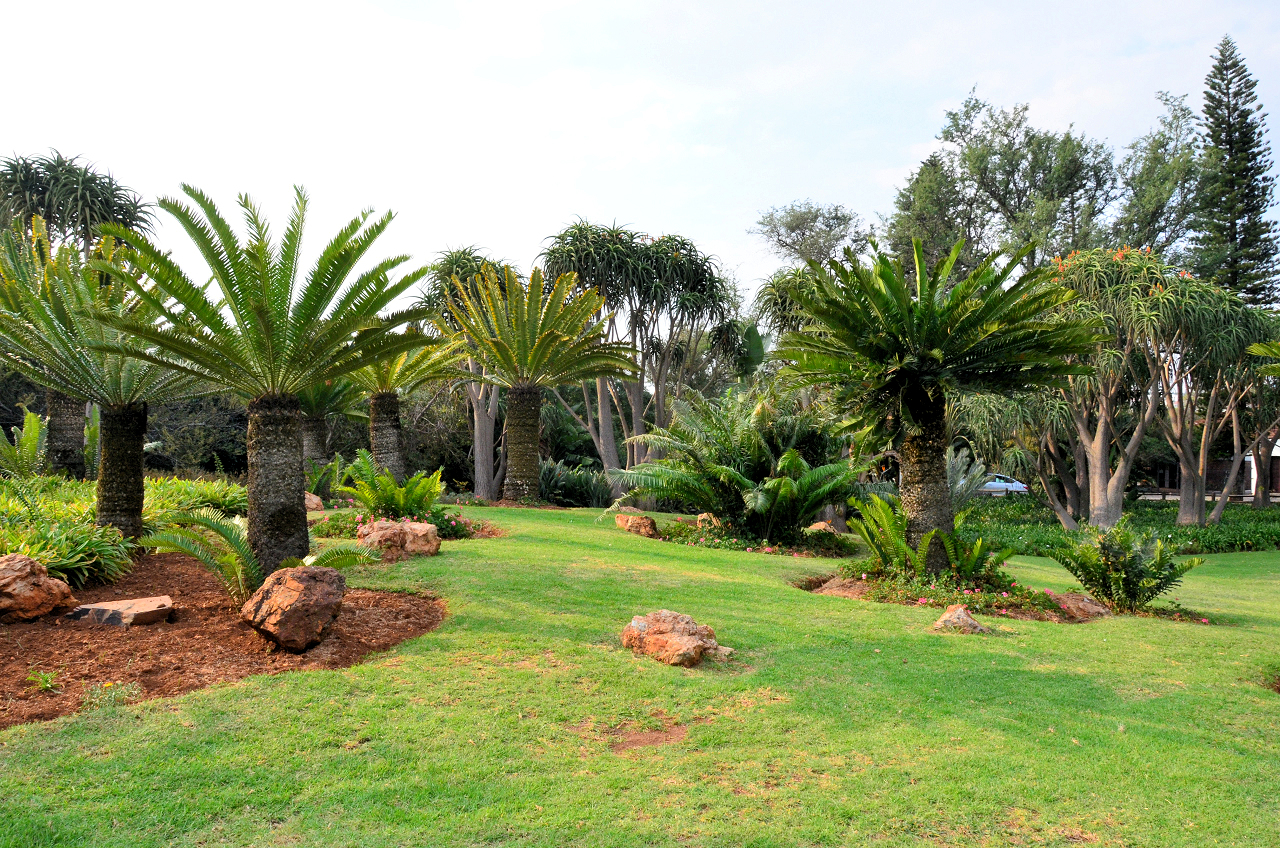
Cycads in Jan Cilliers Park

Jan Cilliers Park is a park in Groenkloof, Pretoria, South Africa. The 4.5-hectare (11-acre) park on the northern slopes of Klapperkop is also known as Protea Park. The park is dedicated to native plants and offers scenic views of the city and the Union Buildings. The park is on the corner of Wenning and Broderick Streets, with the entrance on the latter. The centerpiece of the park is a stream with 14 miniature waterfalls connecting two dams alongside a wide variety of plants. The park also features large lawns interspersed with rockeries, trees, and shrubs.

== History ==
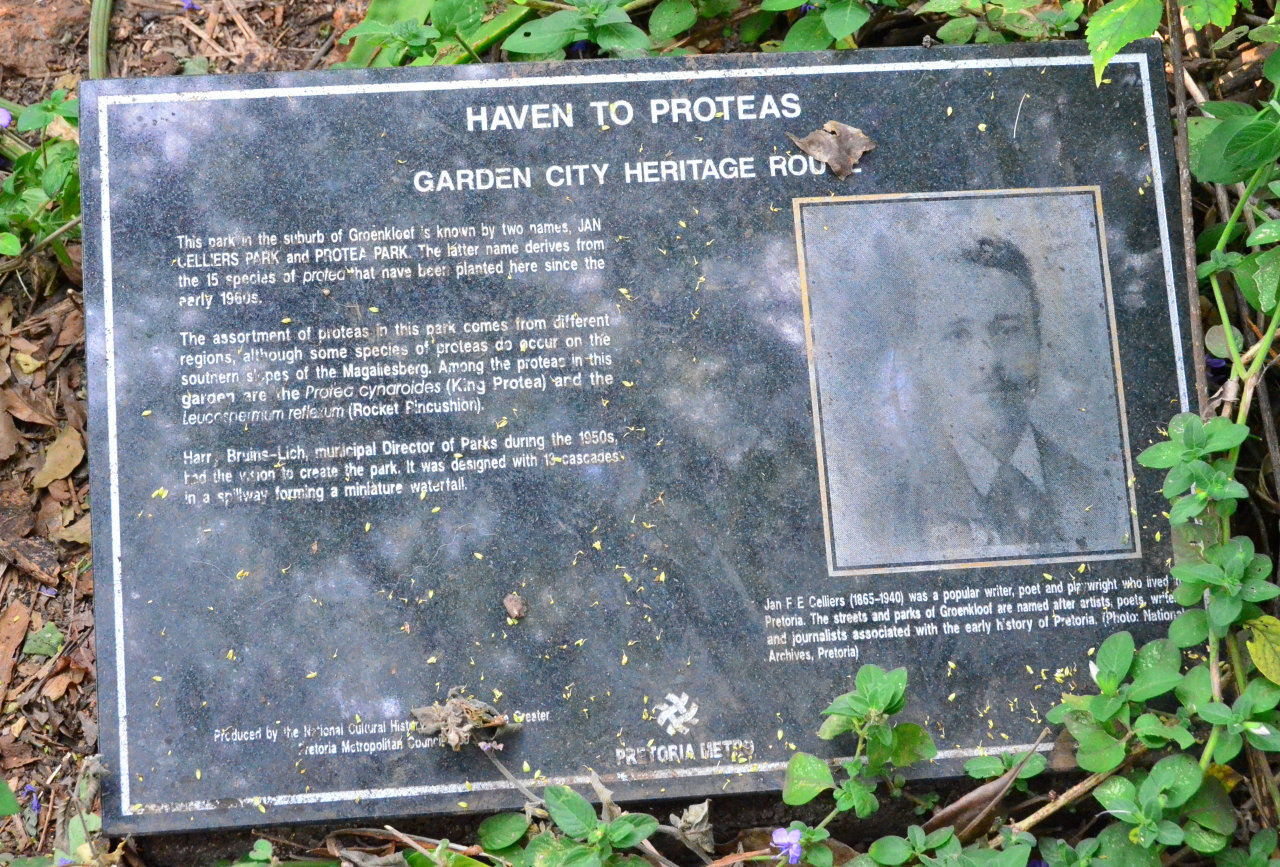
Jan Cilliers Park was named after the poet Jan FE Celliers

The park was designed in the 1960s by Harry Bruins-Lich, director of parks in Pretoria from 1942 to 1967, and was named after the Afrikaner poet, Jan F.E. Celliers.

== Photo gallery ==
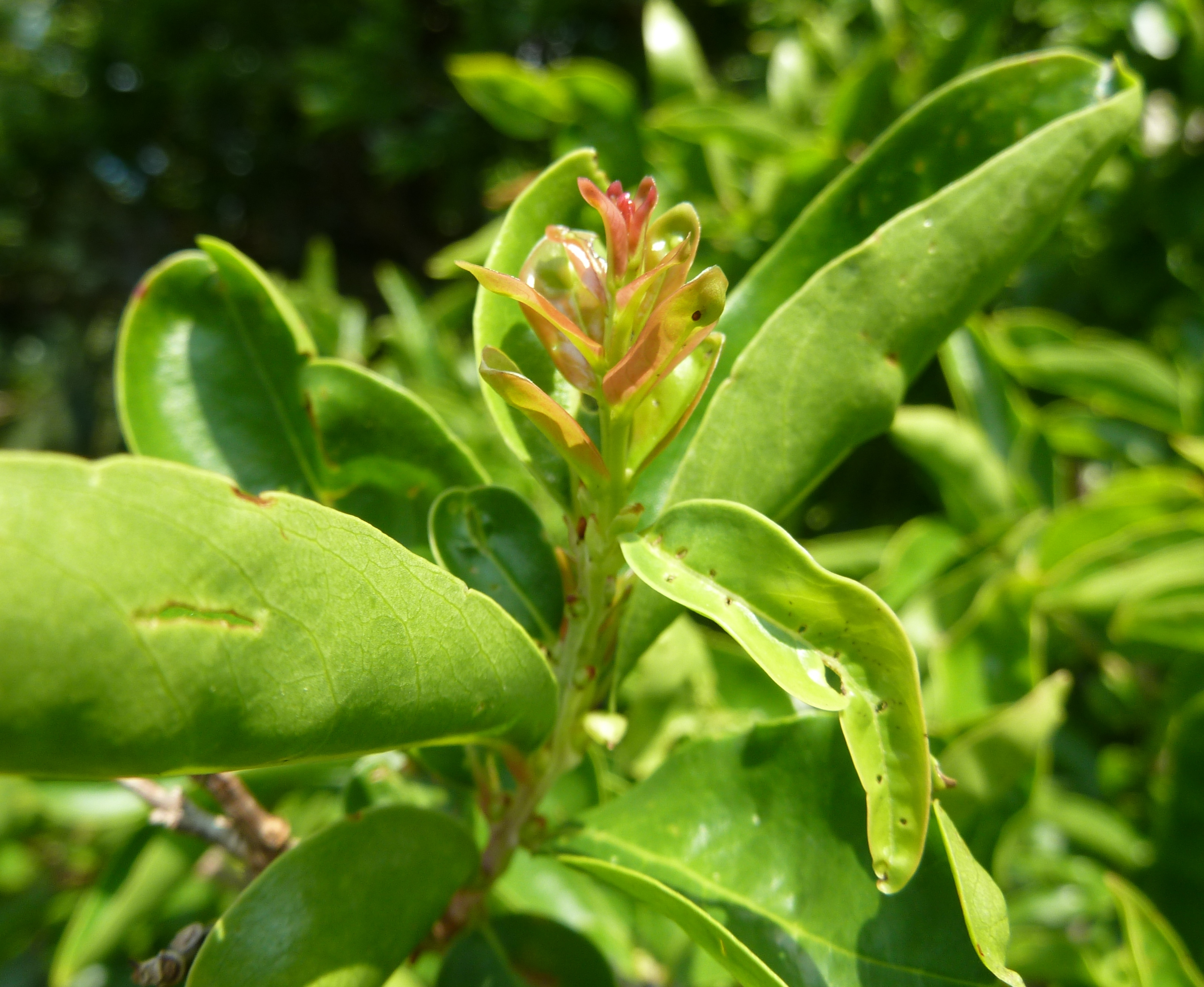
Wild Pride of India in Jan Cilliers Park

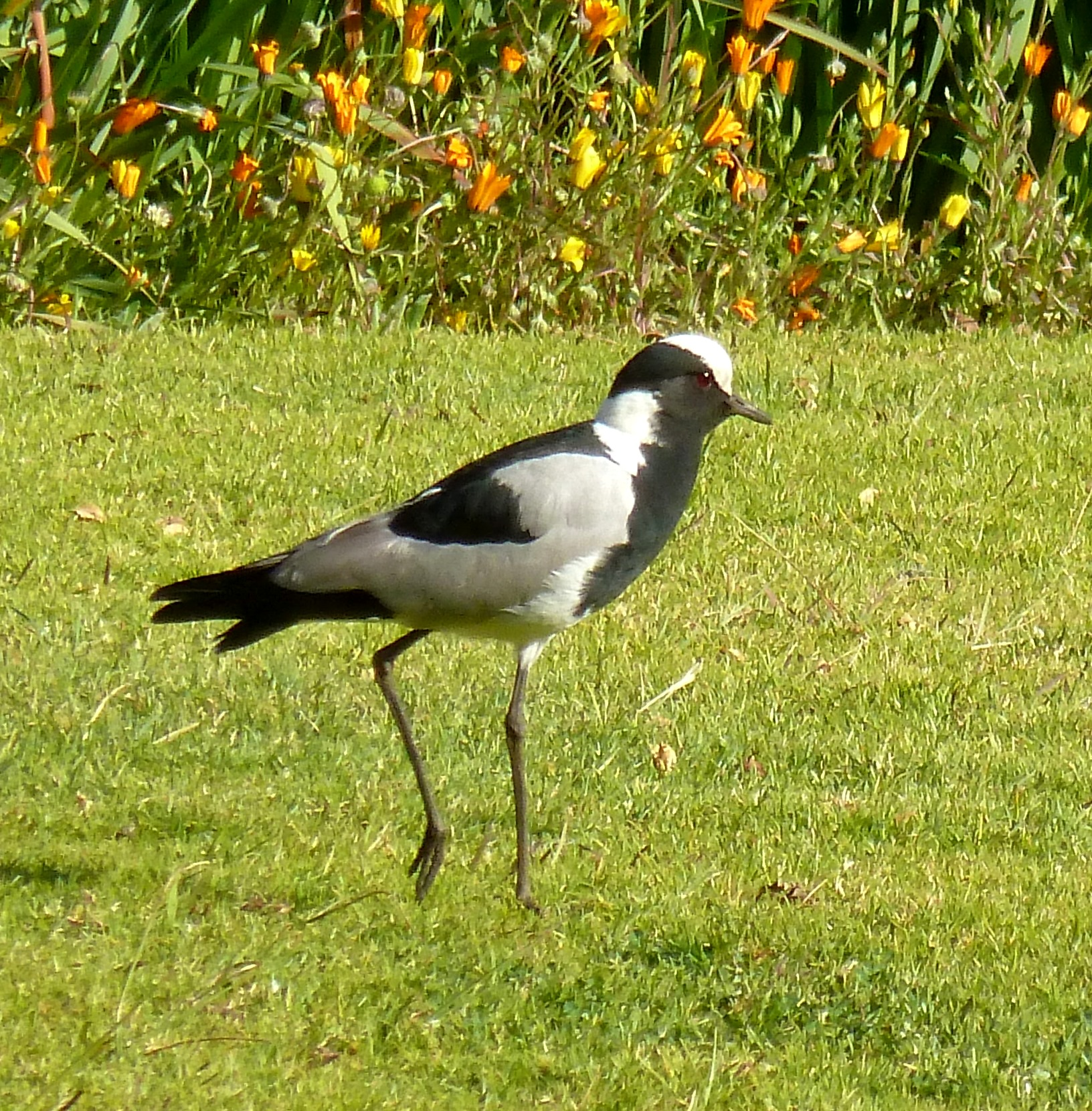
Blacksmith lapwing in the park

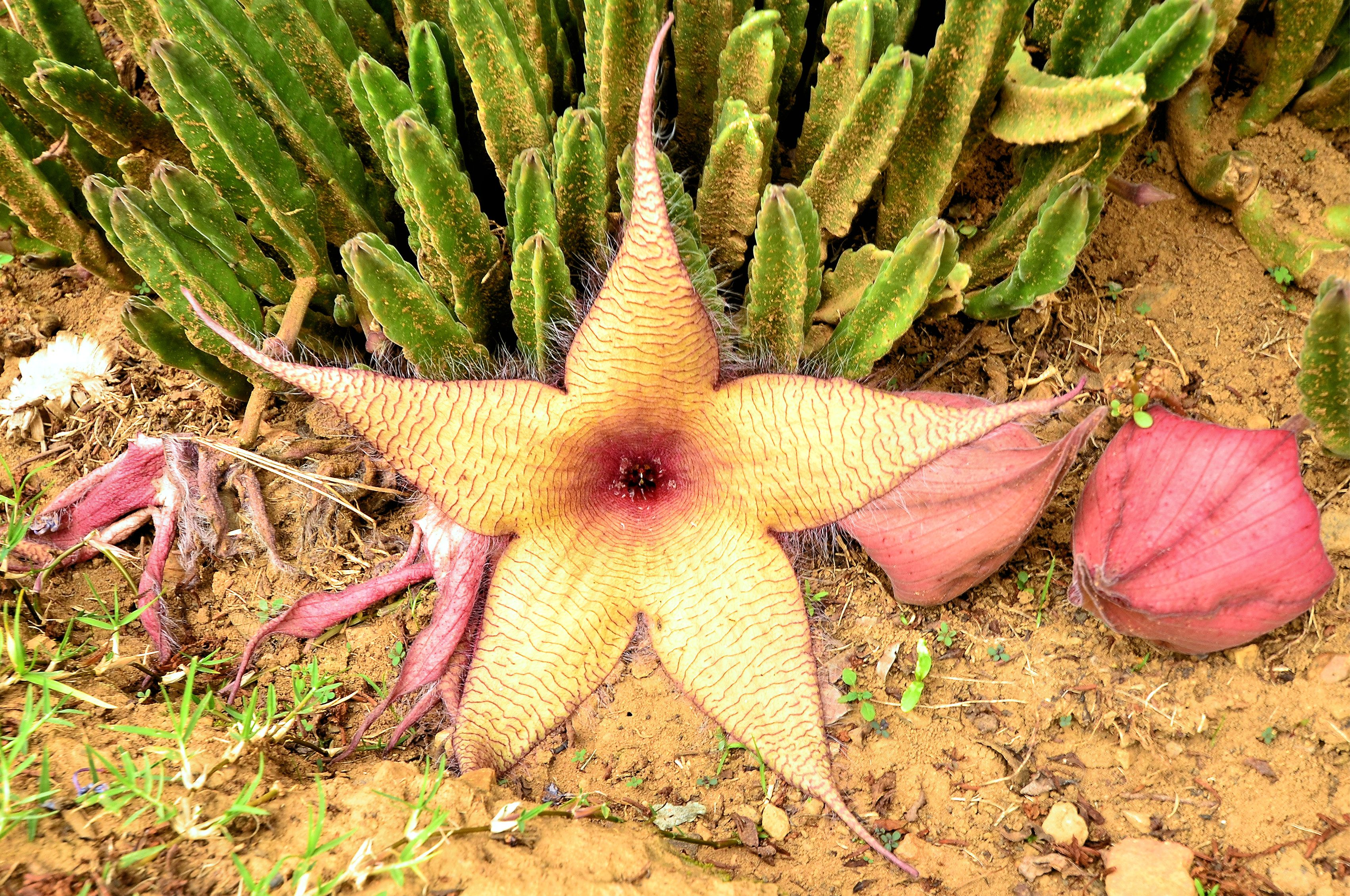
Giant star flower
