= Groenkloof Nature Reserve =

Nature reserve near Pretoria, South Africa

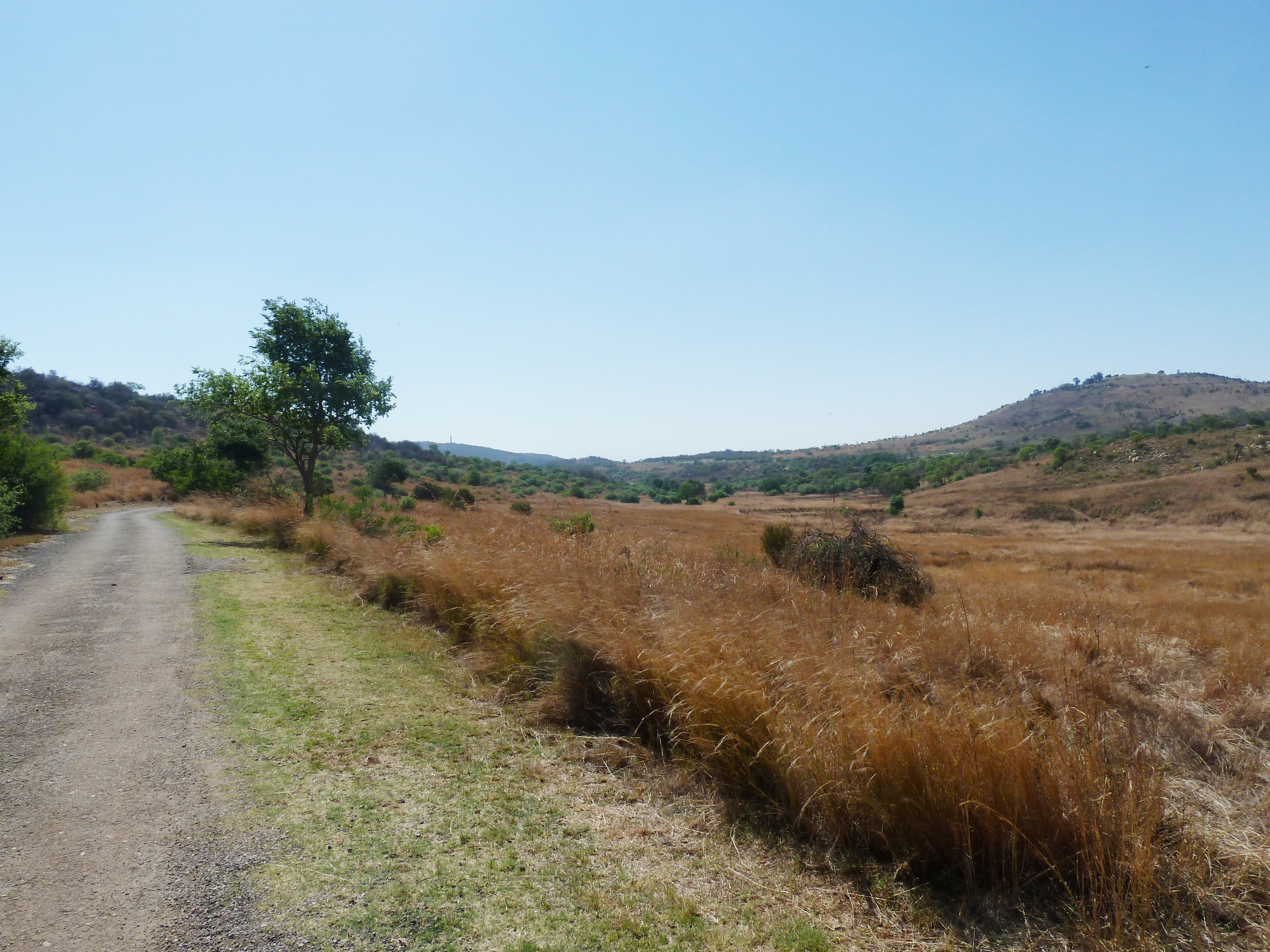

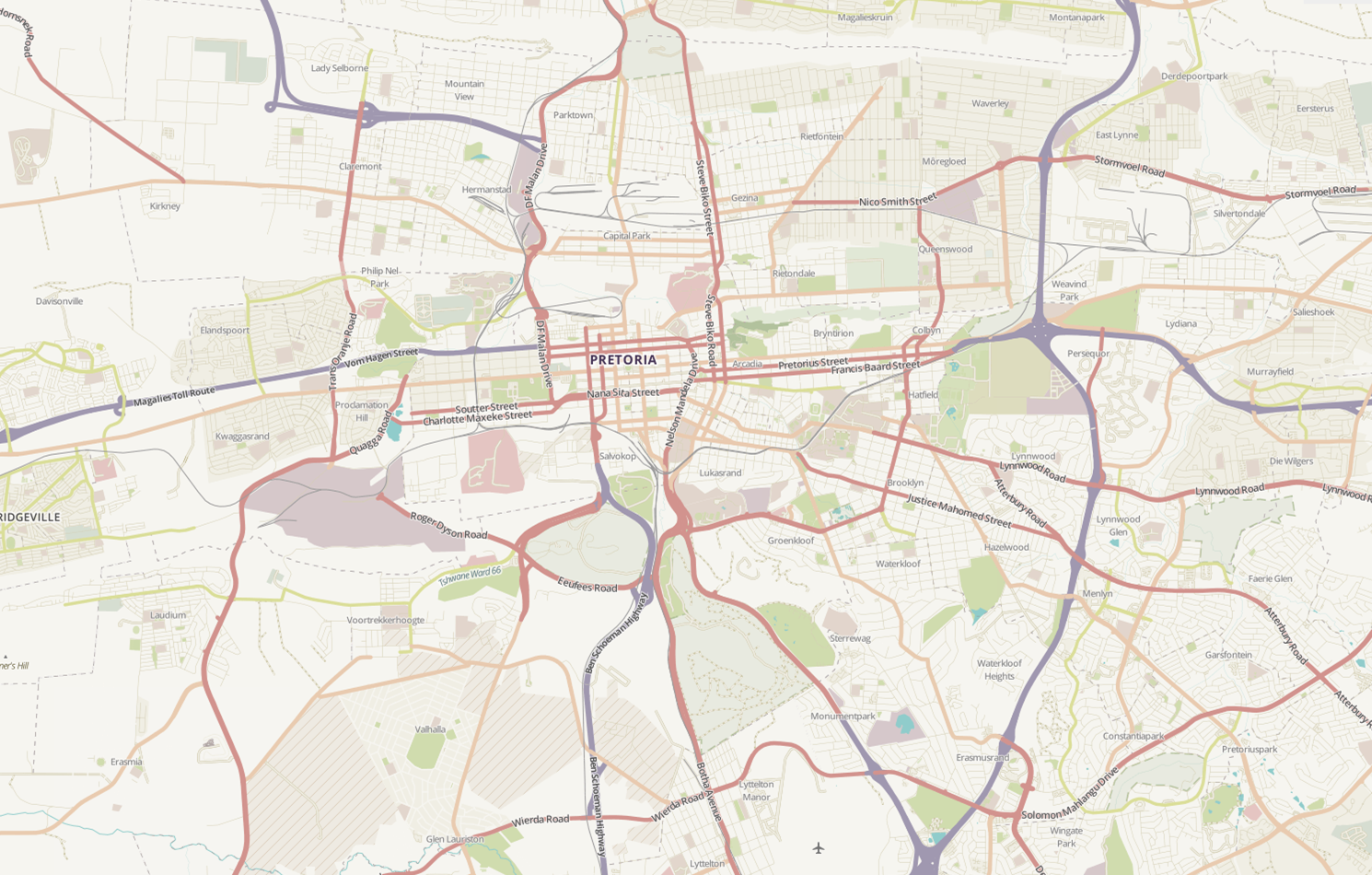
- Location within Pretoria Location within Gauteng
- Location: Tshwane, South Africa
- Nearest city: Pretoria
- Coordinates: 25.7934°S 28.2039°E
- Established: 1895
- Website: Groenkloof NR, City of Tshwane

The Groenkloof Nature Reserve, located adjacent to the Fountains Valley at the southern entrance to Pretoria, was the first game sanctuary in Africa. The reserve of 600 ha is managed by the Department of Nature Conservation. The National Heritage Monument is located within the reserve. It is flanked by Christina de Wit Avenue and Nelson Mandela Drive, that separate it from the Voortrekker Monument and Klapperkop Nature Reserves. In aggregate these reserves conserve some 1,400 ha of bankenveld vegetation which is threatened in Gauteng. The reserve is open to day visitors from 05:30 to 19:00 in summer, and 07:00 to 18:00 in winter.

== History ==
This valley on the southern outskirts of Pretoria was proclaimed a game sanctuary by President Paul Kruger on 25 February 1895. Its main purpose was to protect the shy and timid oribi, which occurred there, and other game that were being depleted by hunters. For many years however, the reserve was leased for exotic timber plantation, to supply wood and paper. A memorial wall is to be seen beside traces of the homestead of the early pioneer Lucas Bronkhorst, who settled here around 1839.

In April 2015 the head of the reserve, David Boshoff, was suspended and evicted from his council home by the Tshwane metro HR manager. The eviction came in the fifth month of a strike by the majority of the reserve's workers, who reportedly negated their agreement with management to return to work in February.

== Wildlife ==
When the reserve was reproclaimed in 1994, the plantations were removed to allow the natural vegetation to regenerate. Open grassland occurs along the Apies valley and the higher plateau. Native trees occur at varying densities on the hillsides and in the lower valley. These include white stinkwood, hook-thorn, mountain karee, velvet bushwillow, wild pear and puzzle bush.

Since 1999 the reserve was stocked with various game species. These include zebra, blesbok, impala, kudu, blue wildebeest, red hartebeest (since 2002), giraffe (2002), sable (2003) and ostrich. Jackal, duiker and rock hyrax are also resident.

Over 120 bird species have been recorded in the reserve and the adjacent Fountains Valley. Game birds include guineafowl, Swainson's spurfowl and crested francolin. The grassy floodplain of the Apies river and its riparian vegetation provide breeding habitat for a number of weaver, bishop and widow species, while the open woodlands on the lower hill slopes provide breeding territories for bushshrike and tchagra species.

Bird species of Groenkloof Nature Reserve
Common name	Scientific name	Status	Breeding
Common ostrich	Struthio camelus	uncommon	
Reed cormorant	Phalacrocorax africanus	vagrant	
Grey heron	Ardea cinerea	rare	
Cattle egret	Bubulcus ibis	uncommon	
Hamerkop	Scopus umbretta	rare	
Hadeda ibis	Bostrychia hagedash	abundant	
Egyptian goose	Alopochen aegyptiacus	uncommon	
Yellow-billed kite	Milvus aegyptius	rare	
Verreaux's eagle	Aquila verreauxii	uncommon	
Steppe buzzard	Buteo vulpinus	rare	
Little sparrowhawk	Accipiter minullus	rare	
Coqui francolin	Peliperdix coqui	rare	
Crested francolin	Dendroperdix sephaena	rare	
Swainson's spurfowl	Pternistis swainsonii	regular	
Helmeted guineafowl	Numida meleagris	abundant	breeder
Crowned lapwing	Vanellus coronatus	regular	
Blacksmith lapwing	Vanellus armatus	rare	
African wattled lapwing	Vanellus senegallus	rare	
Speckled pigeon	Columba guinea	rare	
African olive pigeon	Columba arquatrix	rare	breeder
Red-eyed dove	Streptopelia semitorquata	regular	breeder
Cape turtle-dove	Streptopelia capicola	abundant	
Laughing dove	Streptopelia senegalensis	abundant	
Rock dove	Columba livia	rare	
Grey go-away-bird	Corythaixoides concolor	abundant	
Red-chested cuckoo	Cuculus solitarius	uncommon	breeder
Black cuckoo	Cuculus clamosus	uncommon	breeder
Levaillant's cuckoo	Clamator levaillantii	rare	breeder
Klaas's cuckoo	Chrysococcyx klaas	rare	breeder
Diderick cuckoo	Chrysococcyx caprius	regular	breeder
White-rumped swift	Apus caffer	uncommon	
Little swift	Apus affinis	uncommon	
African palm-swift	Cypsiurus parvus	uncommon	
Speckled mousebird	Colius striatus	regular	
Red-faced mousebird	Urocolius indicus	regular	
Woodland kingfisher	Halcyon senegalensis	rare	breeder
Brown-hooded kingfisher	Halcyon albiventris	rare	
European bee-eater	Merops apiaster	uncommon	
African hoopoe	Upupa africana	regular	
Green wood-hoopoe	Phoeniculus purpureus	regular	breeder
Black-collared barbet	Lybius torquatus	common	
Yellow-fronted tinkerbird	Pogoniulus chrysoconus	rare	
Crested barbet	Trachyphonus vaillantii	abundant	
Lesser honeyguide	Indicator minor	uncommon	
Brown-backed honeybird	Prodotiscus regulus	rare	
Golden-tailed woodpecker	Campethera abingoni	rare	
Cardinal woodpecker	Dendropicos fuscescens	uncommon	
Red-throated wryneck	Jynx ruficollis	rare	
Rufous-naped lark	Mirafra africana	rare	breeder
Barn swallow	Hirundo rustica	rare	
White-throated swallow	Hirundo albigularis	rare	
Greater striped swallow	Hirundo cucullata	regular	
Lesser striped swallow	Hirundo abyssinica	rare	
South African cliff-swallow	Hirundo spilodera	rare	
Rock martin	Hirundo fuligula	uncommon	
Common house-martin	Delichon urbicum	rare	
Black cuckooshrike	Campephaga flava	rare	
White-breasted cuckooshrike	Coracina pectoralis	vagrant	
Fork-tailed drongo	Dicrurus adsimilis	common	
Black-headed oriole	Oriolus larvatus	regular	
Pied crow	Corvus albus	uncommon	
Arrow-marked babbler	Turdoides jardineii	common	
Dark-capped bulbul	Pycnonotus tricolor	abundant	breeder
Kurrichane thrush	Turdus libonyanus		regular
Groundscraper thrush	Psophocichla litsipsirupa	uncommon	
Karoo thrush	Turdus smithi	rare	
Mocking cliff-chat	Thamnolaea cinnamomeiventris	rare	
African stonechat	Saxicola torquatus	rare	
Cape robin-chat	Cossypha caffra	common	
White-browed scrub-robin	Cercotrichas leucophrys	rare	
Willow warbler	Phylloscopus trochilus	rare	
Marsh warbler	Acrocephalus palustris	rare	
Cape grassbird	Sphenoeacus afer	rare	
Bar-throated apalis	Apalis thoracica	rare	
Zitting cisticola	Cisticola juncidis	rare	breeder
Neddicky	Cisticola fulvicapilla	regular	
Rattling cisticola	Cisticola chiniana	uncommon	breeder
Lazy cisticola	Cisticola aberrans	rare	
Tawny-flanked prinia	Prinia subflava	abundant	
Black-chested prinia	Prinia flavicans	uncommon	breeder
Spotted flycatcher	Muscicapa striata	uncommon	
Southern black flycatcher	Melaenornis pammelaina	rare	
Fiscal flycatcher	Sigelus silens	regular	
Chinspot batis	Batis molitor	rare	
Fairy flycatcher	Stenostira scita	rare	
African paradise-flycatcher	Terpsiphone viridis	uncommon	breeder
Striped pipit	Anthus lineiventris	rare	
Common fiscal	Lanius collaris	abundant	
Southern boubou	Laniarius ferrugineus	abundant	
Black-backed puffback	Dryoscopus cubla	regular	
Brown-crowned tchagra	Tchagra australis	rare	breeder
Black-crowned tchagra	Tchagra senegalus	regular	breeder
Bokmakierie	Telophorus zeylonus	common	breeder
Grey-headed bush-shrike	Malaconotus blanchoti	rare	breeder
White-crested helmet-shrike	Prionops plumatus	rare	
Brubru	Nilaus afer	rare	
Common myna	Acridotheres tristis	common	breeder
Cape glossy starling	Lamprotornis nitens	regular	
Red-winged starling	Onychognathus morio	rare	
White-bellied sunbird	Cinnyris talatala	regular	
Amethyst sunbird	Chalcomitra amethystina	regular	
Cape white-eye	Zosterops virens	rare	
House sparrow	Passer domesticus	rare	
Cape sparrow	Passer melanurus	common	breeder
Southern masked-weaver	Ploceus velatus	abundant	breeder
Southern red bishop	Euplectes orix	regular	breeder
Red-collared widowbird	Euplectes ardens	uncommon	breeder
White-winged widowbird	Euplectes albonotatus	regular	breeder
Long-tailed widowbird	Euplectes progne	rare	breeder
Bronze mannikin	Spermestes cucullatus	uncommon	
African firefinch	Lagonosticta rubricata	rare	
Jameson's firefinch	Lagonosticta rhodopareia	rare	
Blue waxbill	Uraeginthus angolensis	rare	
Black-faced waxbill	Estrilda erythronotos	rare	
Common waxbill	Estrilda astrild	uncommon	
Purple indigobird	Vidua purpurascens	rare	breeder
Yellow-fronted canary	Crithagra mozambicus	common	breeder
Black-throated canary	Crithagra atrogularis	regular	
Streaky-headed seedeater	Crithagra gularis	regular	
Cinnamon-breasted bunting	Emberiza tahapisi	rare	

Special invertebrates of the reserve include Gunning's rock scorpion, golden-starburst baboon spider, the violin spider L. speluncarum which is endemic to caves of the Pretoria area, and the purse-web spider, Calommata transvaalica, which is severely threatened by urbanization in Gauteng.

== Facilities and activities ==
Entrance fees differ depending on the intended activity, and the number of persons partaking. The reserve is popular with cyclists, and mountain bikers can follow a 20 km route. The three hiking trails are designated as the red (1.3/3.5 km), white (3.7 km) and yellow (10.5 km) trails. Hikers can reserve an overnight hut. Off-road enthusiasts can explore 14 km of 4x4 tracks, while game viewing is possible from a 5 km motor car route. Guided horse rides and pony rides for kids are also offered. There are two picnic areas, named Meriting and Mashupeng, and a lapa may be rented for evening get-togethers.

== Gallery ==
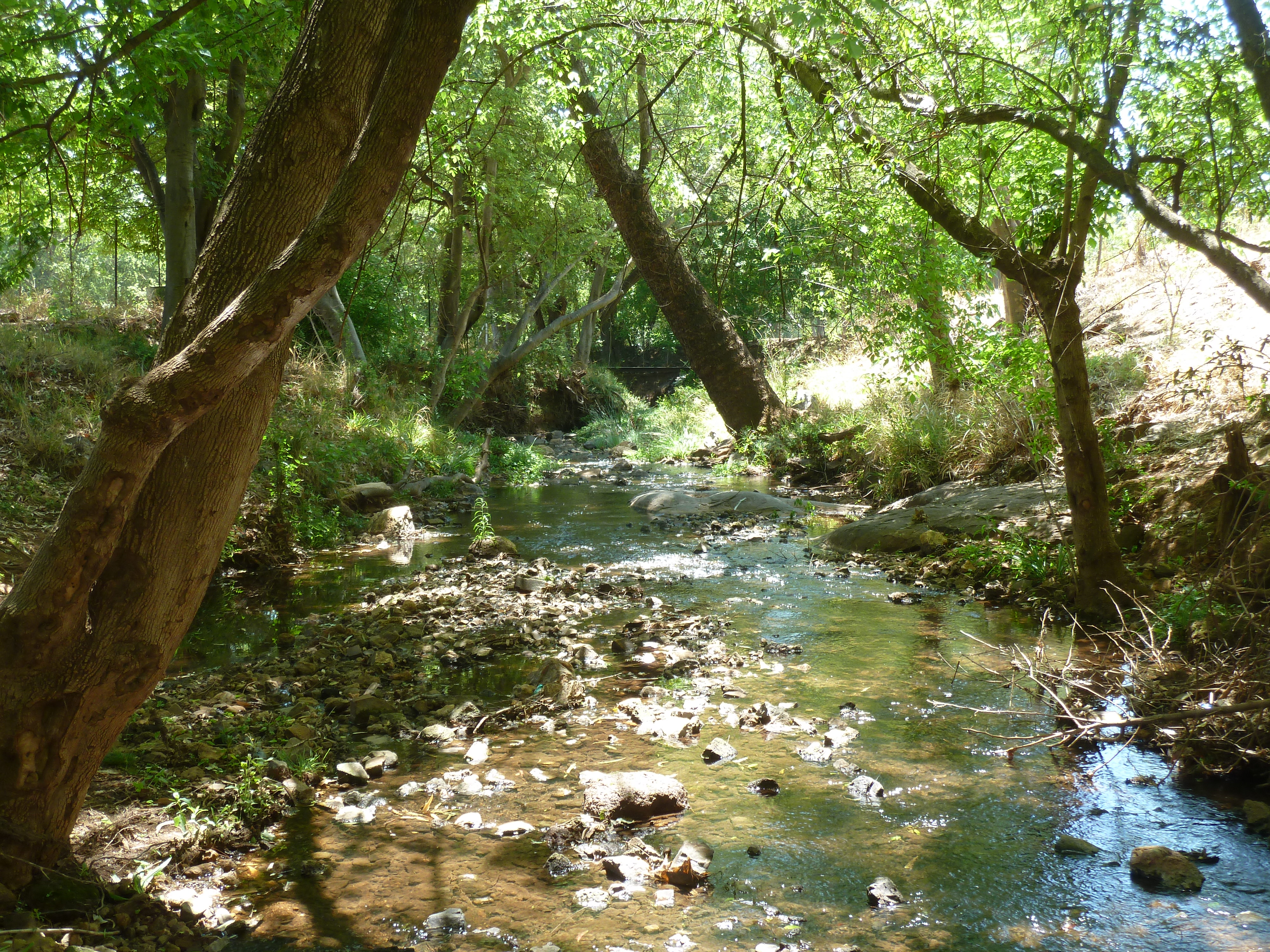
Apies River

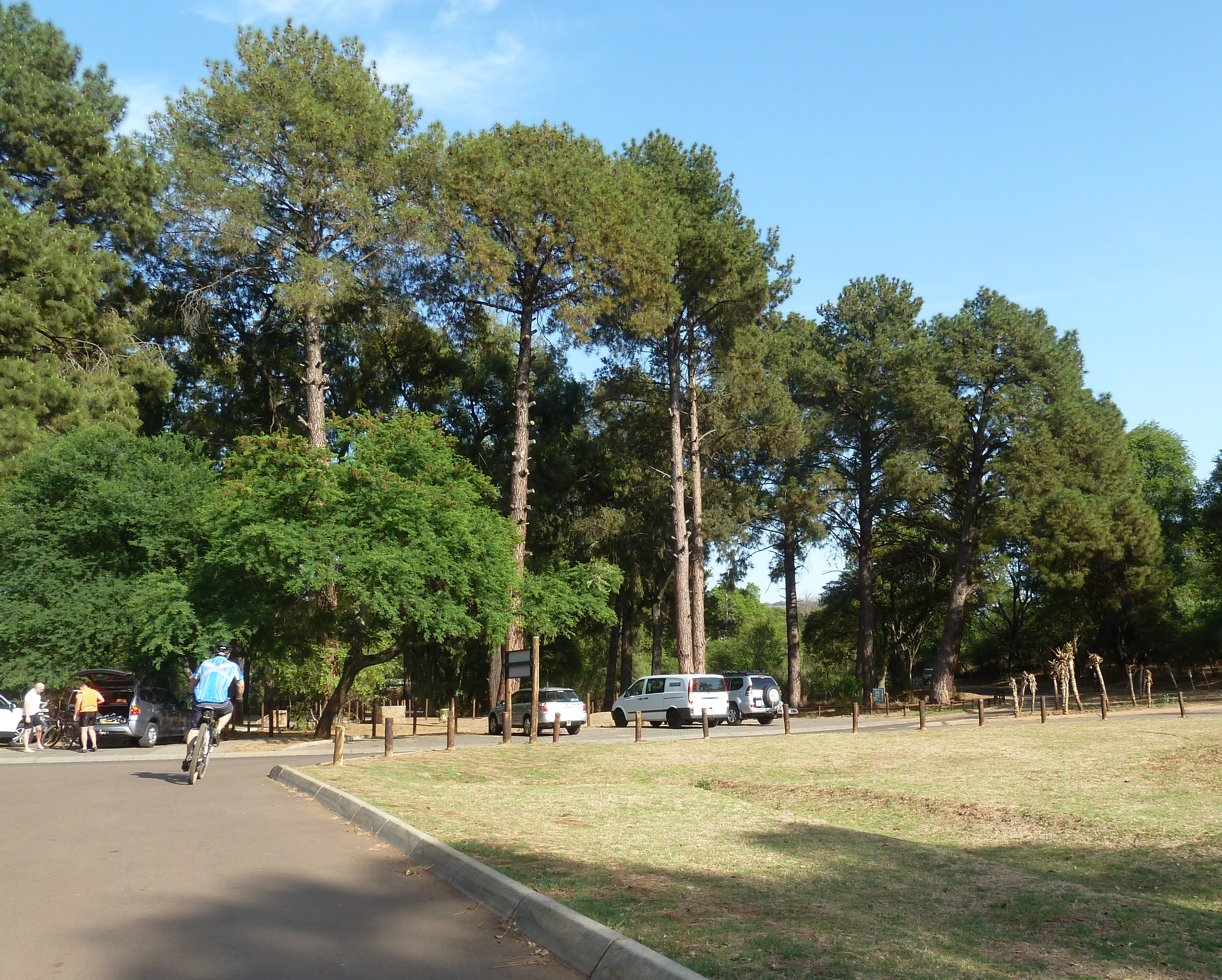
Meriting picnic area

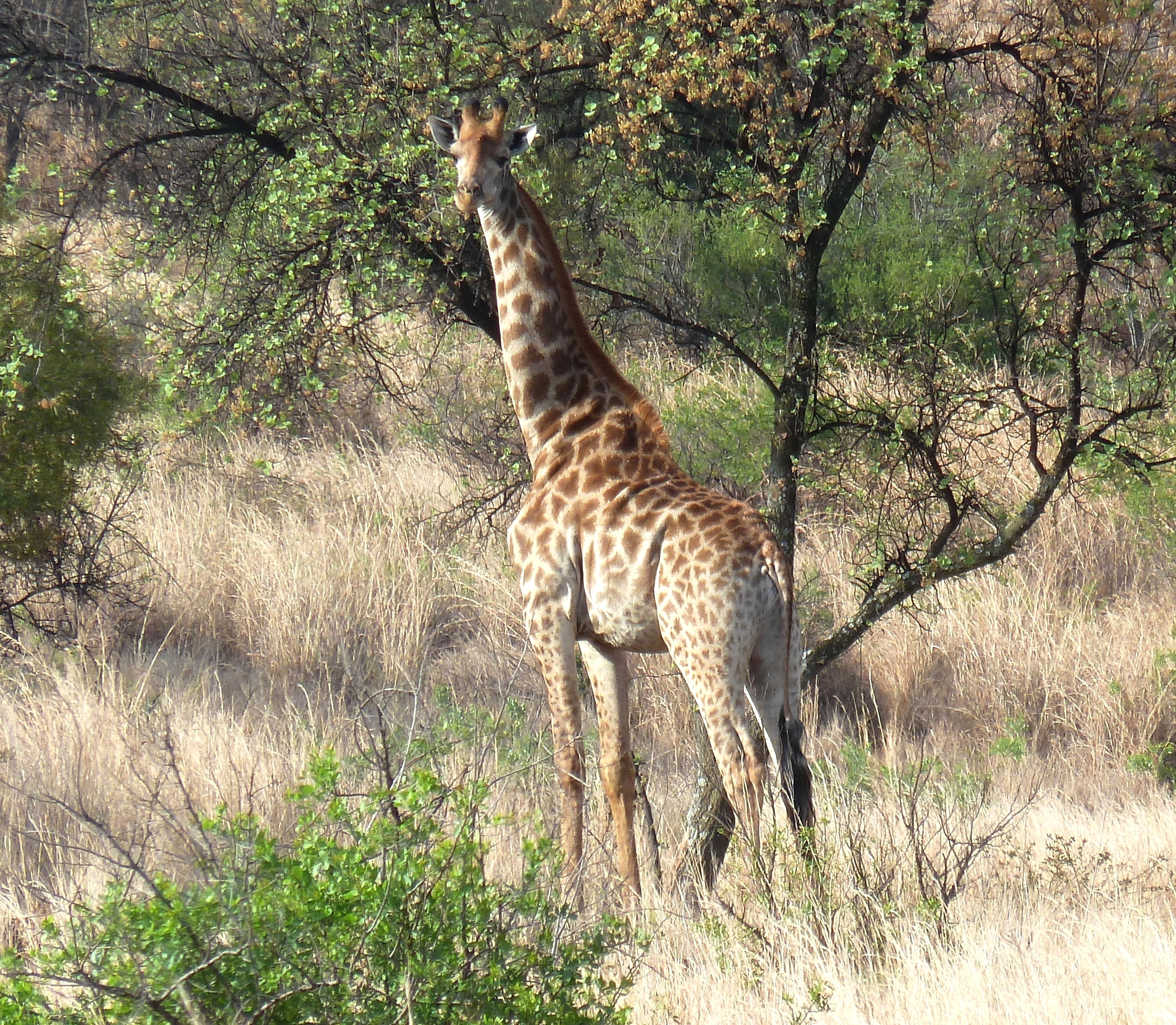
Giraffe

== See also ==
- National Heritage Monument
