= National Heritage Monument =

Coordinates: 25°47′04″S 28°11′43″E

The National Heritage Monument is a group of copper statues representing anti-apartheid activists, Zulu chiefs and missionaries in Groenkloof Nature Reserve, south of Pretoria, South Africa. The monument is meant to reflect the struggle for liberation going back to the 1600s. The project was started in 2010, but as of 2015, only has 55 statues. A total of 400 to 500 statues are planned. When complete, the monument will be called "The Long March to Freedom".

== History ==
The idea for the project came from Dali Tambo in 2010, who is also the CEO of the National Heritage Project Company. The first of the statues was unveiled in September 2015 by Nathi Mthethwa, the South African Minister of Arts and Culture.

== Figures represented ==
- Autshumato
- Chief Tshwane
- Chief Klaas Stuurman
- Louis van Mauritius
- Dr Johannes van der Kemp
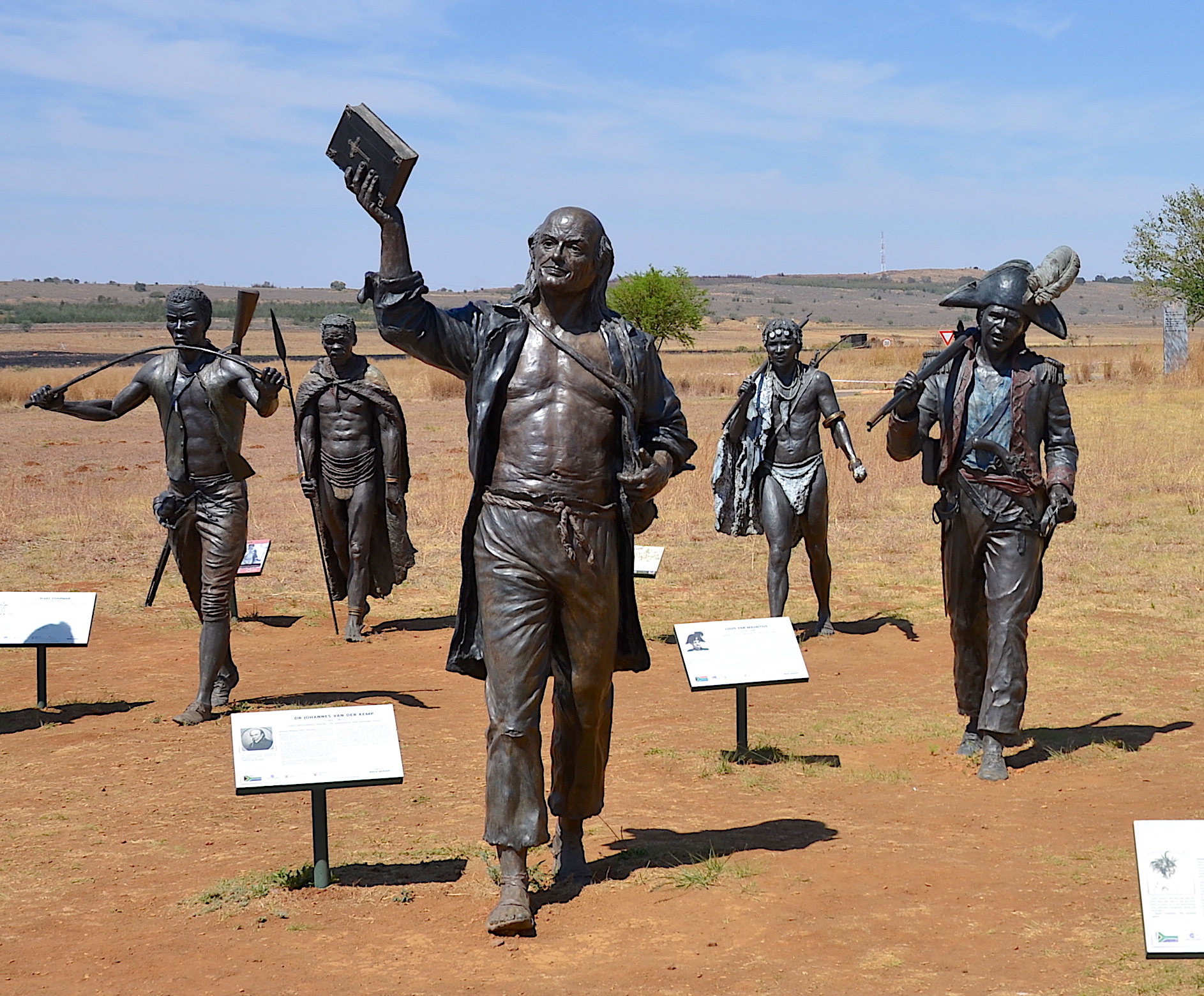
  Missionary Johannes van der Kemp
- Makhanda
- King Shaka kaSenzangakhona
- Chief David Stuurman
- Hintsa kaKhawuta
- King Dingane
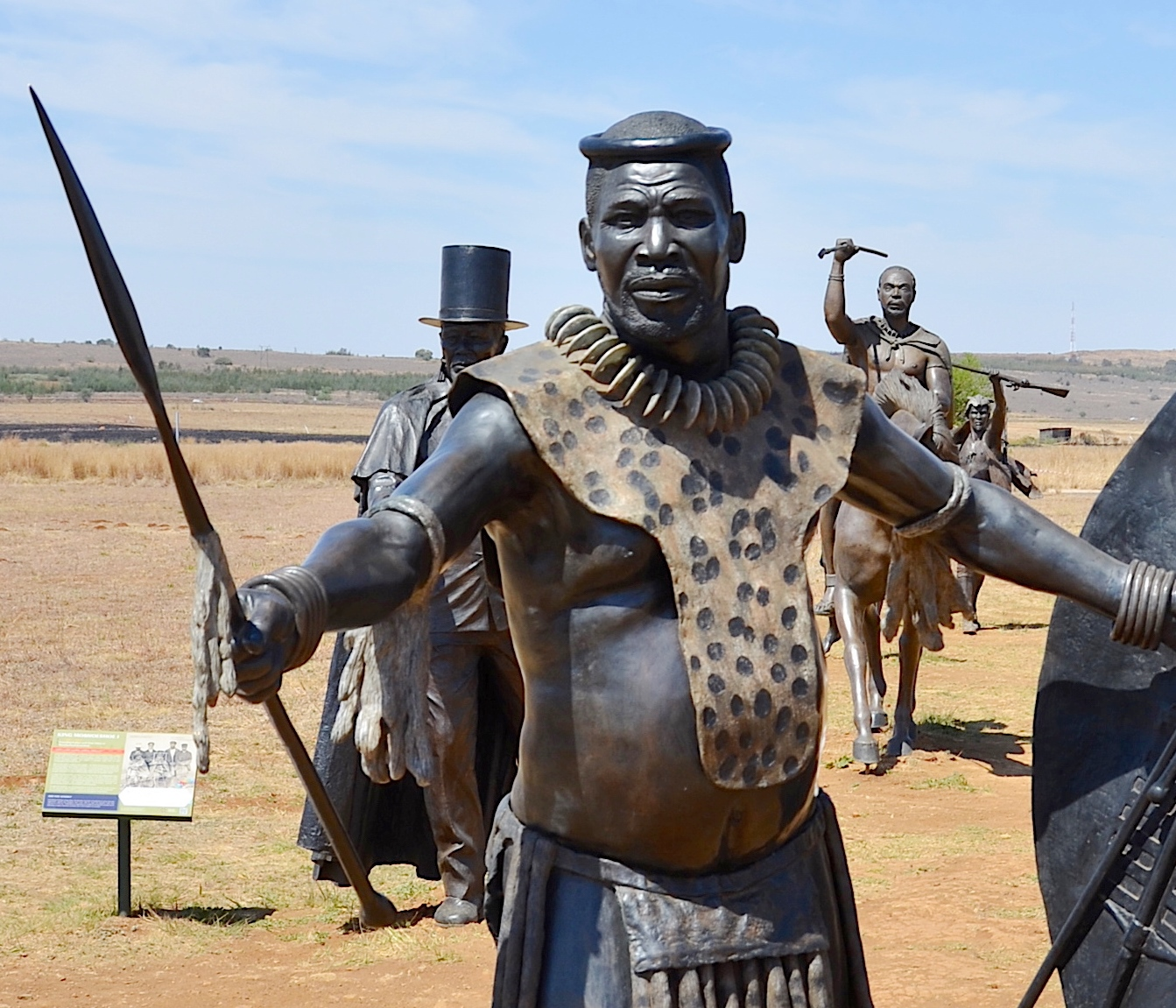
  King Dingane
- King Faku
- King Mzilikazi
- King Moshoeshoe
- Kgosi Kgamanyane Pilane
- Chief Adam Kok III
- Chief Sandile kaNgqika
- King Sekhukhune I
- Bishop John Colenso
- King Cetshwayo kaMpande
- King Langalibalele
- King Makhado Ramabulana
- Chief Dalasile
- King Nyabela
- Chief Bhambatha kaMancinza
- King Dinuzulu kaCetshwayo
- Saul Msane
- Olive Schreiner
- Hadji Ojer Ally
- Queen Labotsibeni Mdluli
- Alfred Mangena
- Harriette Colenso
- Solomon Plaatje
- Walter Rubusana
- Chief Kgalusi Leboho
- Charlotte Maxeke
- Dr Abdullah Abdurahman
- Thomas Mapikela
- Josiah Gumede
- John Dube
- Anton Lembede
- Mohandas Gandhi
- Selope Thema
- Sefako Makgatho
- Clements Kadalie
- Pixley Seme
- Ida Mntwana
- Alfred Xuma
- Cissie Gool
- Chief Albert Luthuli
- Zachariah Matthews
- Rev Zaccheus Mahabane
- Bram Fischer
- Jack Hodgson
- Steve Biko
- Duma Nokwe
- Solomon Mahlangu
- Josie Mpama
- Lilian Ngoyi
- Bertha Mkhize
- Griffiths Mxenge
- Ruth First
- Yusuf Dadoo
- Annie Silinga
- Victoria Mxenge
- Samora Machel
- Olof Palme
- Alan Paton
- Helen Joseph
- Rahima Moosa
- Chris Hani
- Joe Slovo
- Frances Baard
- Dorothy Nyembe
- Archbishop Trevor Huddleston
- Julius Nyerere
- Govan Mbeki
- Steve Tshwete
- Beyers Naude
- Ray Alexander
- Miriam Makeba
- Helen Suzman
- Bertha Gxowa
- Basil D'Oliveira
- Ruth Mompati
- Fidel Castro
- Albertina Sisulu
- Walter Sisulu
- Adelaide Tambo
- Oliver Tambo
- Nelson Mandela
- Desmond Tutu
