= Ida Mntwana =

South African women rights activist

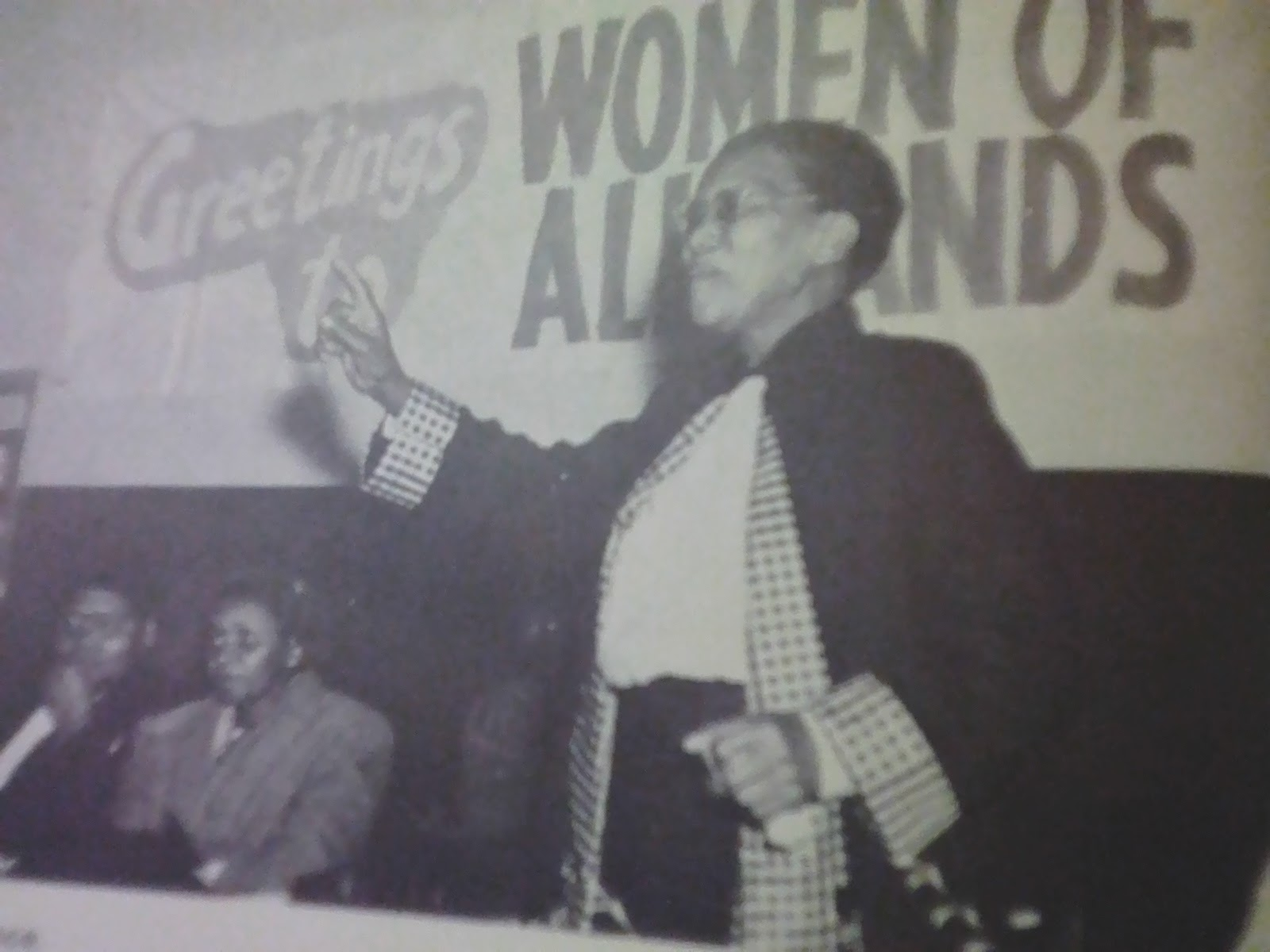
- Born: 1903
- Died: March 1960 (aged 57)
- Occupation: Activist
- Known for: First President of FEDSAW

Ida Fiyo Mntwana (5 August 1903 – March 1960) was a South African activist and dressmaker who led significant organizations promoting women's rights and opposition to apartheid.

Beginning in 1949, she led the African National Congress Women's League (ANCWL) as its first national president after succeeding Madie Hall Xuma. During the 1950s, she was elected to the ANC's (African National Congress) National Executive Committee and introduced more aggressive tactics to organize women against legislation that discriminated against the employment and mobility of women. She organized multiple large-scale protests from the Western Native Township.

Mntwana served as the Federation of South African Women's (FEDSAW) first president from 1954-1956 leading interracial initiatives to combat gender-based persecution during segregation. Her organizational skills were crucial at the 1955 Congress of the People in Kliptown, where she led freedom songs from the platform to calm the assembly and allow the passage of the Freedom Charter's provisions while delegates were surrounded by police. She and other anti-apartheid leaders were charged with subversion in the 1956-1961 Treason Trial, but they were all found not guilty.

== Early life ==
=== Family background ===
Ida Mntwana was born in King William's Town, Eastern Cape Province, South Africa on August 5, 1903. Historical sources identify her as the daughter of an African family in the area, but provide no information about her parents or siblings. However, she was raised in a setting where Xhosa society endured the limitations imposed by British colonization.

=== Education and profession ===
Ida Mntwana's political career started in 1927 when she joined the Industrial and Commercial Workers Union while working as a dressmaker. Since the union's founding in 1919, it has been the first general workers' trade union to include Black workers from all industries. She was subjected to the daily constraints of racial segregation and economic exclusion in this occupation, which was prevalent among urban Black women in early 20th-century South Africa. However, the historical documents that are currently accessible do not provide specifics about her training or admittance into the profession. Her main career outside of activism ended in the late 1940s when she transitioned from dressmaking to leadership positions in women's and anti-apartheid activities. According to biographical reports, Mntwana did not attend any official educational institutions, which is consistent with the fact that many Black South Africans of her period had restricted access to education.

== Political involvement ==
=== ANC Women's League ===
Ida Mntwana first became involved in the African National Congress (ANC) activities in 1948 when she joined the ANC Women's League (ANCWL) as a dressmaker who had previously worked in labor organizing. During this first stage, she concentrated on organizing women through campaigns to raise awareness of social and political inequalities, such as protests against discriminatory laws like pass laws and boycotts.

After Madie Hall Xuma resigned as ANCWL president in 1949, Mntwana was elected to the role, assuming national leadership within the league, and her influence grew. In contrast to her predecessor, she took a more militant approach as president, working with radicals from the ANC Youth League, of which she was a member, to increase women's involvement in anti-apartheid initiatives and turn the ANC's base into a mass movement. During this time, she organized protests, strikes, and acts of civil disobedience in places like Western Native Township, setting the stage for larger mobilizations.

Mntwana's influence reached the ANC's national structures by the early 1950s, and her election to the party's Executive Committee demonstrated her quick rise from supporting organizing to key positions of decision-making. She prioritized empirical challenges to apartheid's socioeconomic constraints over accommodationist tactics during her early ANC reign, which focused on grassroots recruitment and disobedience initiatives. Although internal discussions about strategy periodically brought to light contradictions between moderation and radicalism, these efforts positioned the ANCWL as a crucial force in elevating women's voices amid growing persecution.

=== FEDSAW leadership ===
On April 17, 1954, the Federation of South African Women (FEDSAW) was founded as a non-racial umbrella organization that brought together women from different political and ethnic groups to combat apartheid. At the foundation meeting, Ida Mntwana, a well-known member of the ANCWL, was chosen as the organization's first national president, with Ray Alexander acting as national secretary. Her choice was a reflection of her background in grassroots women's organizing and her dedication to interracial solidarity, both of which were essential components of FEWDSAW's charter, which placed a strong emphasis on equality and opposition to pass laws.

Mntwana oversaw FEDSAW's attempts to organize thousands of women for national campaigns during her presidency from 1954-1956. This included organizing delegations to the Congress of the People in June 1955, where FEDSAW helped create the Freedom Charter. Despite government persecution, she promoted coalitions amongst African, Colored, Indian, and white campaigners in order to unite urban and rural women against discriminatory legislation. Under her direction, FEDSAW grew through public protests and regional chapters, elevating the voices of women in the larger Congress Alliance.

As state crackdowns intensified, Mntwana's term came to an end in 1956. She was arrested as one of the first defendants in the Treason Trial and accused of communist treason alongside other FEDSAW executives. Even after Lilian Ngoyi took over as leader, her strategic emphasis on nonviolent mass action and organizational unity provided the foundation for FEDSAW's long-lasting influence.

== Marches ==
Ida Mntwana led the Germiston March on August 26, 1952. 11 Indian ladies, 1 colored woman (Susan Naude), and 17 African women made up the group of 29. She and the others were arrested and given a fourteen-day prison sentence in Boksburg. She was also a leader of the FEDSAW march to the Union Buildings in Pretoria on October 27, 1956. Around 2,000 women from Johannesburg participated in that march to protest pass laws for women. Participants escalated from previous passive resistance to direct confrontation by delivering memos emphasizing the laws' role in labor exploitation and family disruption. The greater Women's March on August 9, 1956 was preceded by this action, which created a national disobedience movement that included pass burnings and arrests in places like Durban and Port Elizabeth.

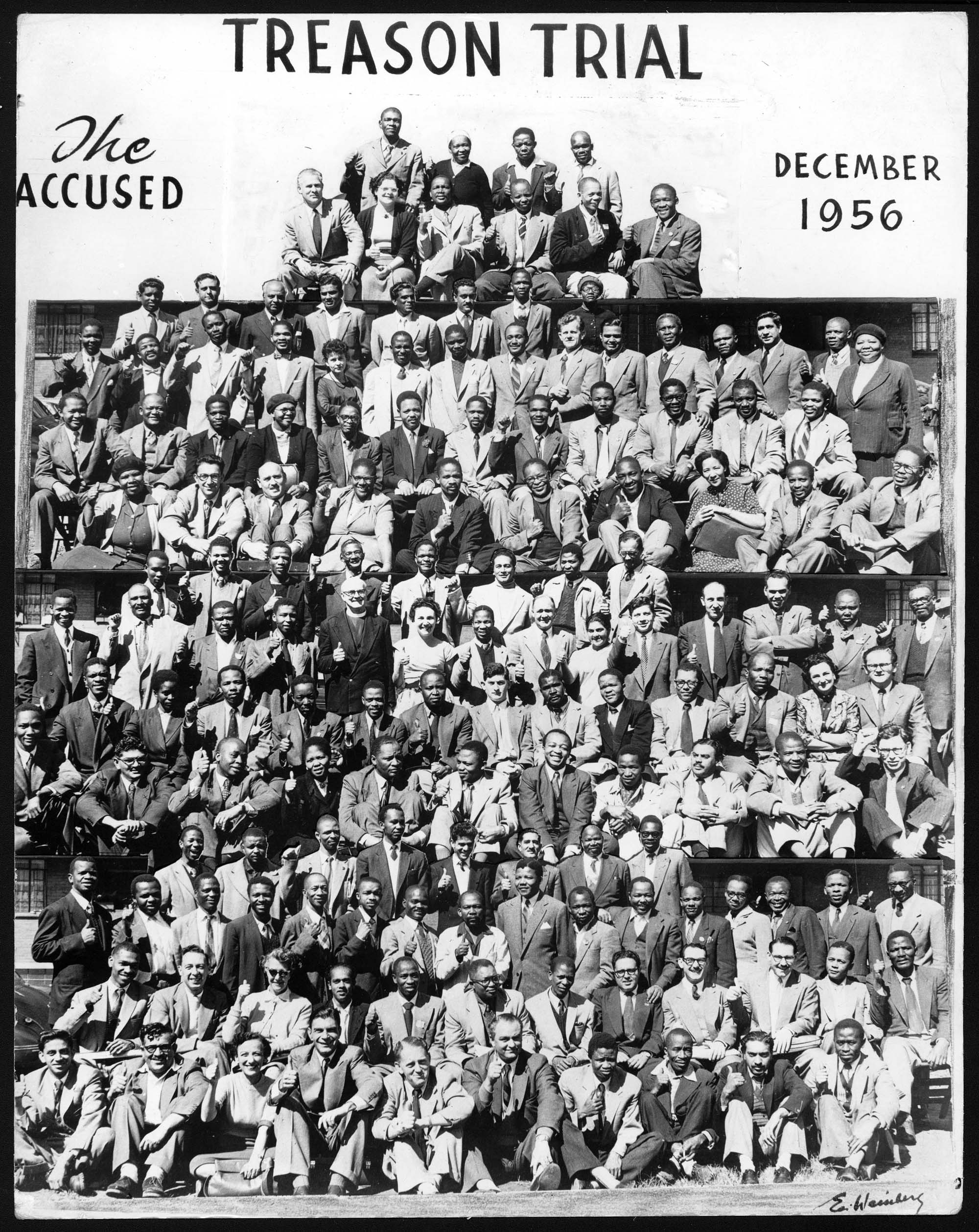
Defendants of the Treason Trial

== Later years ==
Mntwana's uncompromising dedication to the nonviolent Congress Alliance tactic against apartheid policies was demonstrated by her participating in the lengthy Treason Trial procedures, which started in December 1956 and continued sporadically until 1961 amid accusations of high treason against anti-apartheid leaders for suspected communist-inspired actions. Mntwana supported the collective defense by representing the moral and ideological resistance of women's organizations like the ANCWL and FEDSAW, despite the demands of the trial, which included protracted court appearances and legal examination.

== Death ==
Mntwana's particular health issues in the late 1950s are not well documented, but her death at age 57 during the strains of the trial raises the possibility that continued political persecution and the physical costs of activism exacerbated her health issues, signifying the termination of her active participation in official opposition initiatives.

As a show of resistance, the African National Congress arranged Mntwana's funeral, which was conducted at a cemetery close to Johannesburg's Western Native Township, despite government bans on gatherings and protests enforced under emergency measures. Leaders of the ANC Women's League, including Winnie Mandela, served as pallbearers, and in remembrance of her organizational legacy, dozens of women accompanied the casket. Although attendance was constrained by the restrictive legal environment, the event demonstrated the tenacity of women's networks in the face of increasing official crackdowns.

== Legacy ==
One of 100 bronze statues that make up the National Heritage Monument's The Long March to Freedom project features Mntwana. Sarah Lovejoy made her bronze statue. In August 2000, Mntwana was cited as "torchbearer" during Thabo Mbeki's speech in the unveiling of South Africa's Women's Monument She earned a posthumous Order for Meritorious Service in silver in 2003 in recognition of her efforts to combat discrimination and promote women's freedom.
