= Klapperkop Nature Reserve =

Nature reserve in South Africa

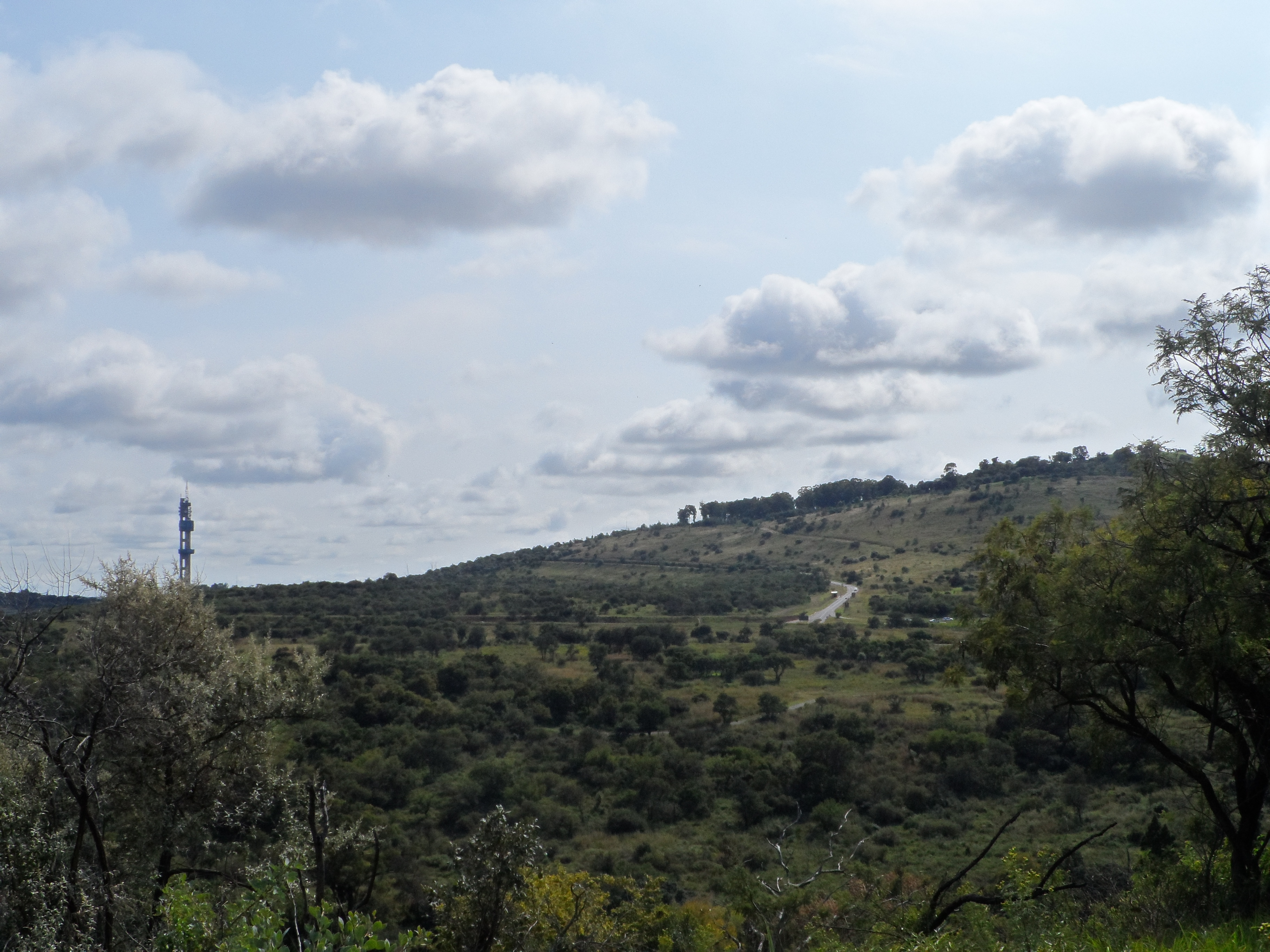
- View of western entrance road

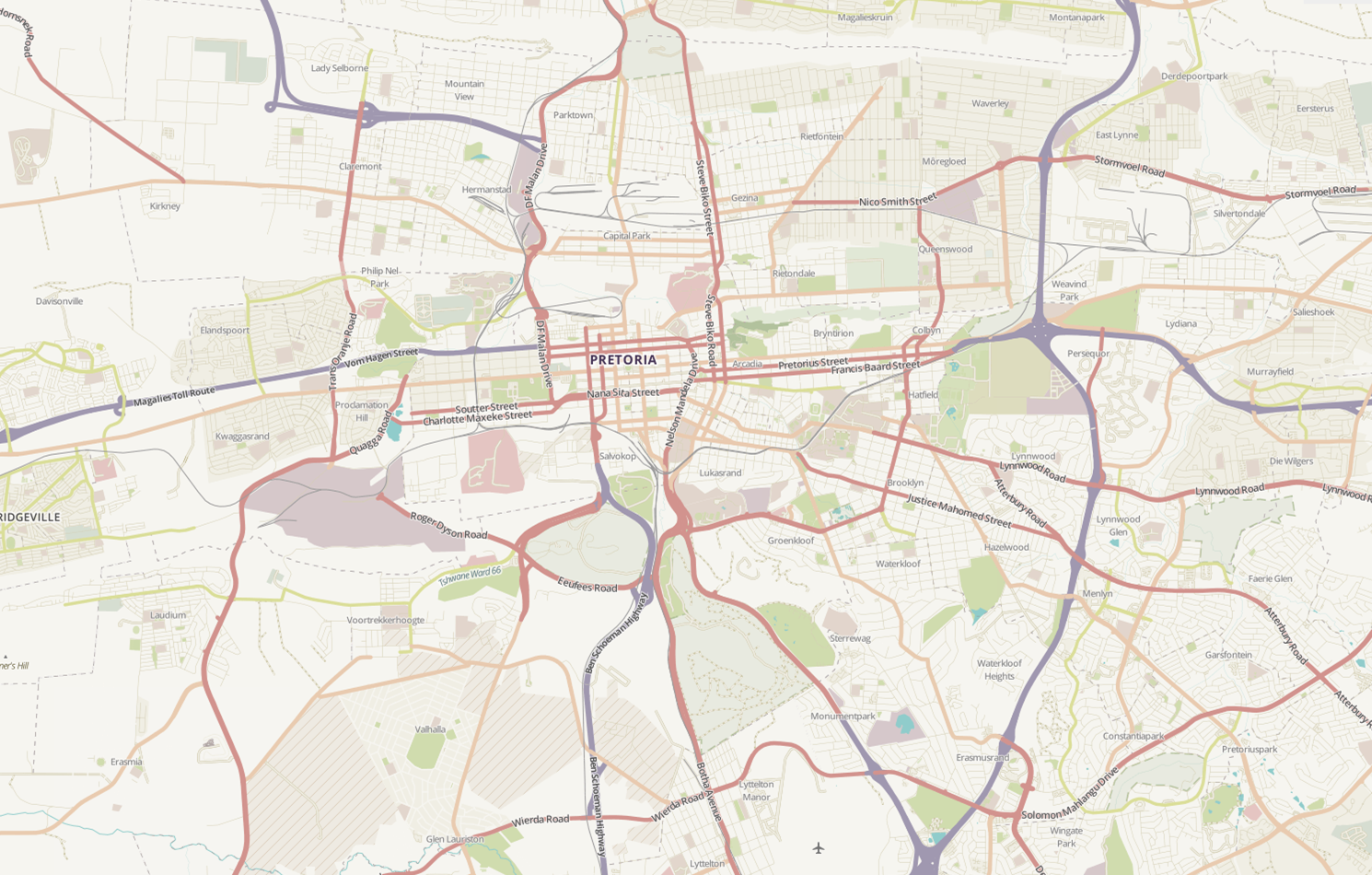
- Location within Pretoria Location within Gauteng
- Location: Tshwane, South Africa
- Nearest city: Pretoria
- Coordinates: 25°47′01″S 28°13′05″E
- Area: c. 460 ha
- Established: 1898
- Website: Klapperkop NR, City of Tshwane

Klapperkop Nature Reserve is a nature reserve of some 460 ha in Pretoria, Gauteng, which was established in 1898. It is managed by the Department of Nature Conservation. Fort Klapperkop, completed in 1897, is situated inside the reserve. The reserve is named for the prominent Klapperkop, a hill (or kopje) vegetated with klapper trees (Strychnos pungens) on its northern slopes.

== Activities ==
It has become popular with cyclists, joggers and sightseers. Self-guided hikes are permitted.

== Visiting hours and safety ==
Despite the recommended daylight visiting hours, Johann Rissik Drive was formerly accessible as a thoroughfare at any hour. This however came under review due to repeated crime incidents. Criminals posing as joggers robbed visitors during the day, and occupants of cars were attacked at view sites. As of 2018, three gangs were believed to be targeting visitors to the reserve, and 30 muggings were recorded in a fortnight. The two entrances in Johann Rissik Drive are currently closed at night.

== Location and habitat ==
It is situated near the Voortrekker Monument and Groenkloof Nature Reserves at the southern entrance to Pretoria. It is situated on a spur running west to east, and can be explored from Johann Rissik drive which connects Nelson Mandela Drive in the west to Waterkloof Ridge residential area in the east. In aggregate these reserves conserve some 1,400 ha of bankenveld vegetation which is threatened in Gauteng.

== Wildlife ==
The reserve was stocked with various game species since the late 1990s. These include zebra, blue wildebeest and red hartebeest. Small mammals include jackal, mongooses, hedgehogs, hares and porcupines. At the same time the extensive plantations of black wattle were removed, allowing the grassland vegetation to recover.

== Gallery ==
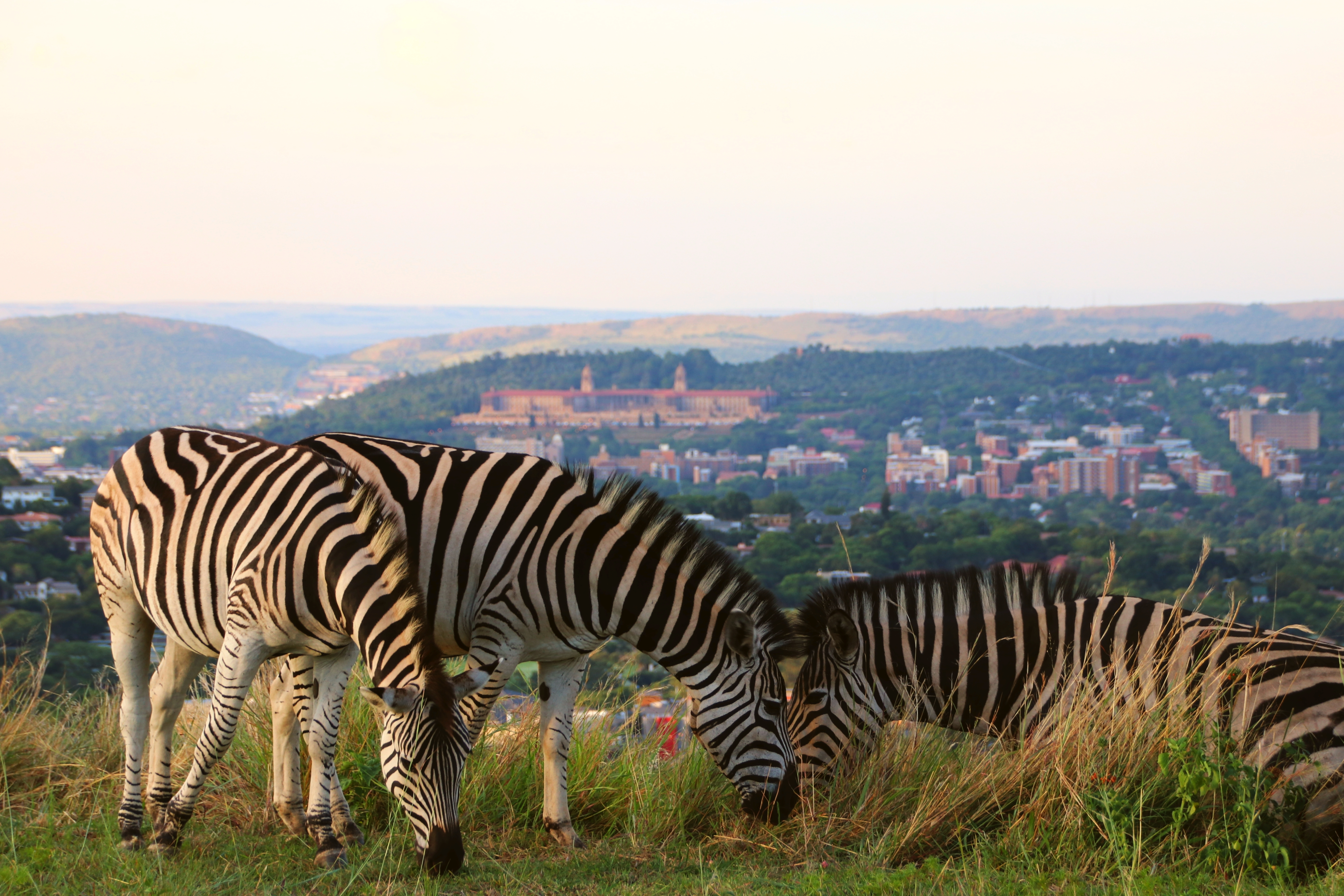
Burchell's zebras grazing at sunset

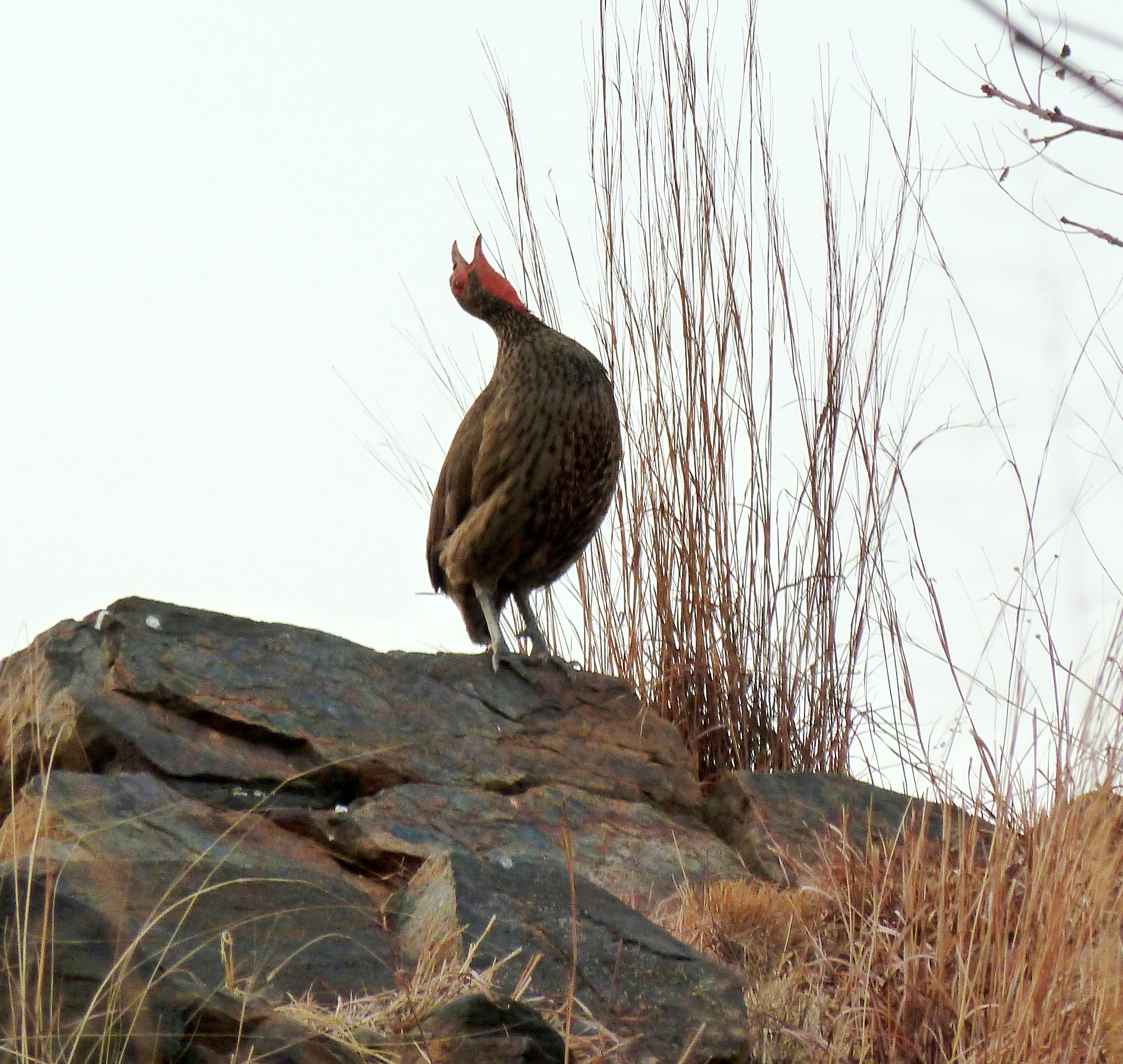
Swainson's spurfowl crowing from a hillock before sunset

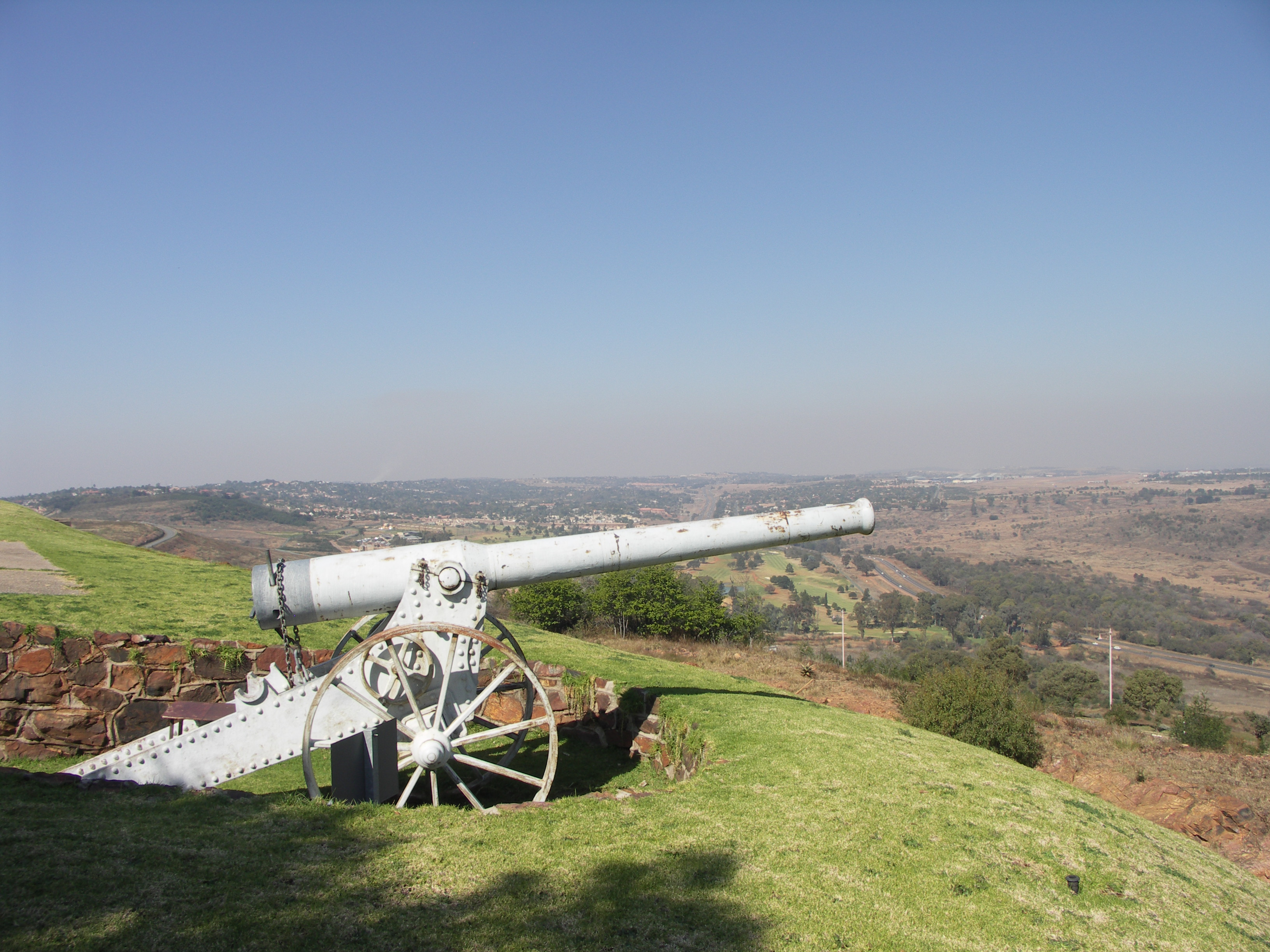
Fort Klapperkop is located inside the reserve
