= Louis van Mauritius =

South African slave who led a rebellion

Louis van Mauritius (1778–1808) was a 30-year-old slave in the Cape Colony (now South Africa). Working as a tailor, he led a slave rebellion on 27 October 1808, in which over 300 slaves participated. The rebellion failed and 47 people were put on trial. Sixteen of the rebels, including van Mauritius, were sentenced to death. All but five of the death sentences were commuted to prison terms. The death sentences of Louis van Mauritius, James Hooper, Abraham van der Kaap, and Jephta of Batavia were confirmed since they had been the ringleaders. The fifth man, Cupido of Java, had his death sentence confirmed since he had been convicted of rape.

An artwork commemorating the 200th anniversary of the rebellion was commissioned by the City of Cape Town and is on display in Church Square, near the old Slave Lodge in Cape Town.
