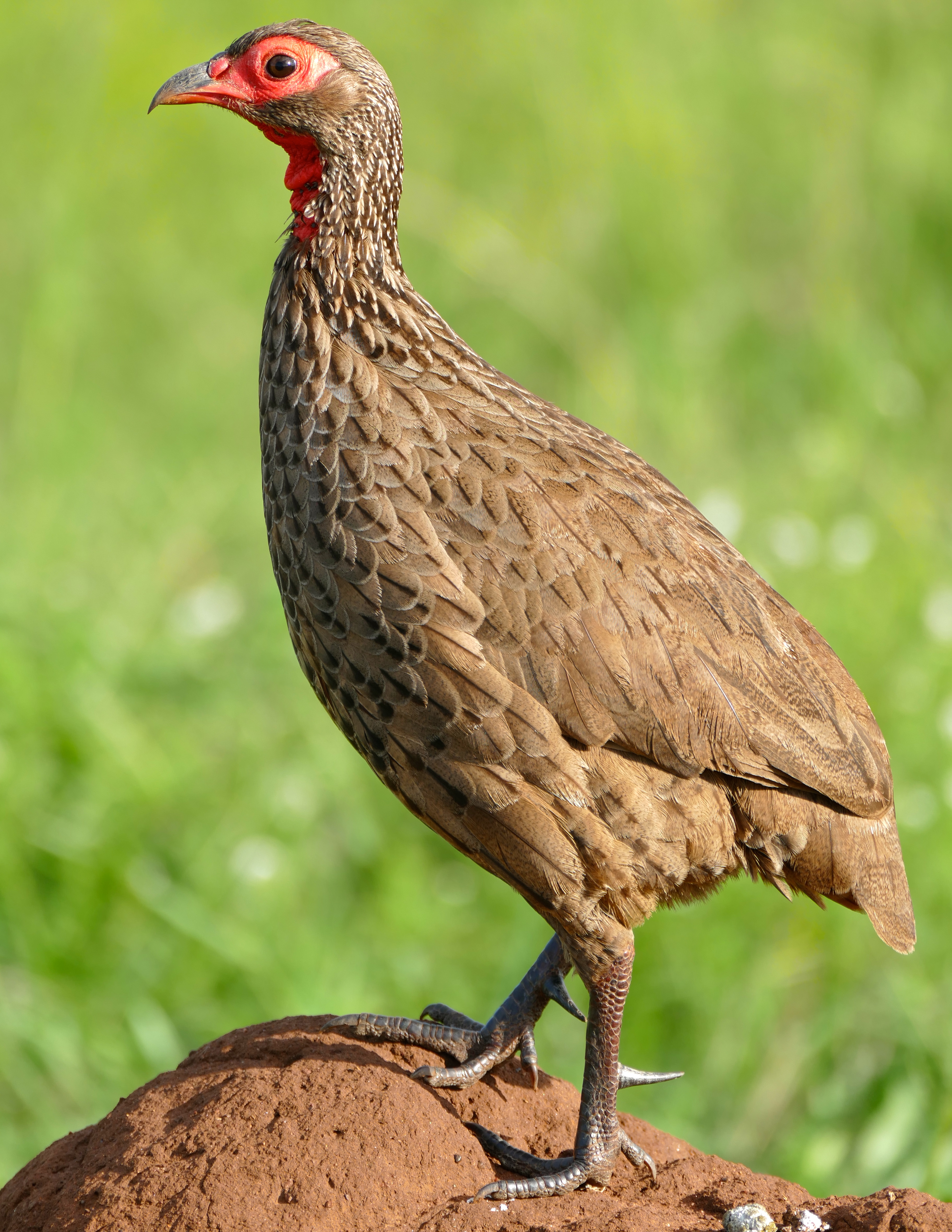
- Adult bird in Kruger National Park and evening call from Pretoria, South Africa

Conservation status
- Least Concern (IUCN 3.1)

Scientific classification
- Kingdom: Animalia
- Phylum: Chordata
- Class: Aves
- Order: Galliformes
- Family: Phasianidae
- Genus: Pternistis
- Species: P. swainsonii

Binomial name
- Pternistis swainsonii (Smith, A, 1836)
- geographic distribution

Synonyms
- Francolinus swainsonii

= Swainson's spurfowl =

Species of bird

Swainson's spurfowl or Swainson's francolin (Pternistis swainsonii) is a species of bird in the family Phasianidae which is native to southern Africa. In the Shona language in Zimbabwe, this bird is called the chikwari or horwe and is considered a delicacy by outdoor and hunting enthusiasts. Swainson's spurfowl was named after William Swainson, an English ornithologist.

== Range and habitat ==
It is found in grasslands and woodlands of Angola, Botswana, Lesotho, Malawi, Mozambique, Namibia, South Africa, Eswatini, Zambia, and Zimbabwe.

== Taxonomy ==
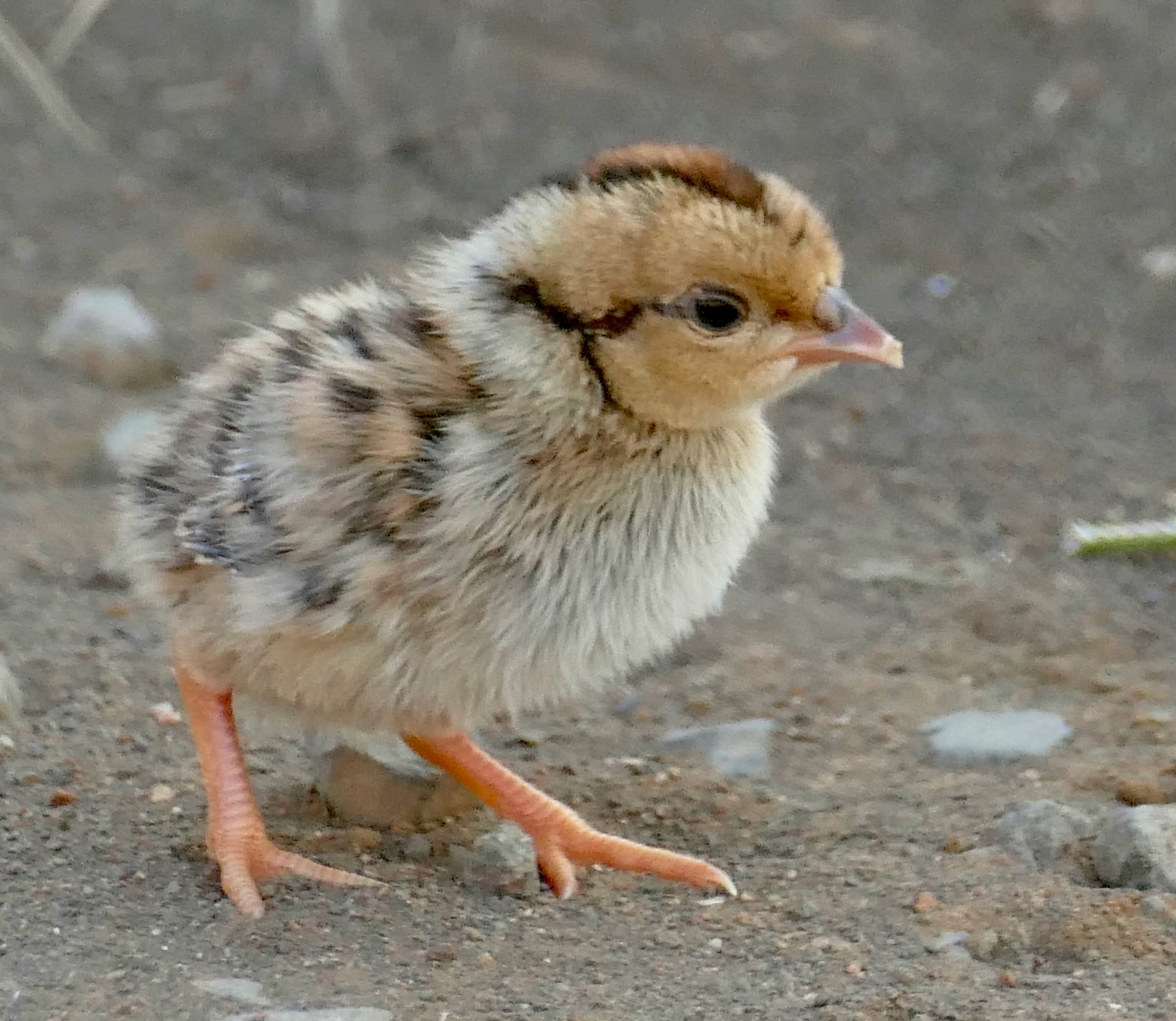
Hatchling in the Kruger Park

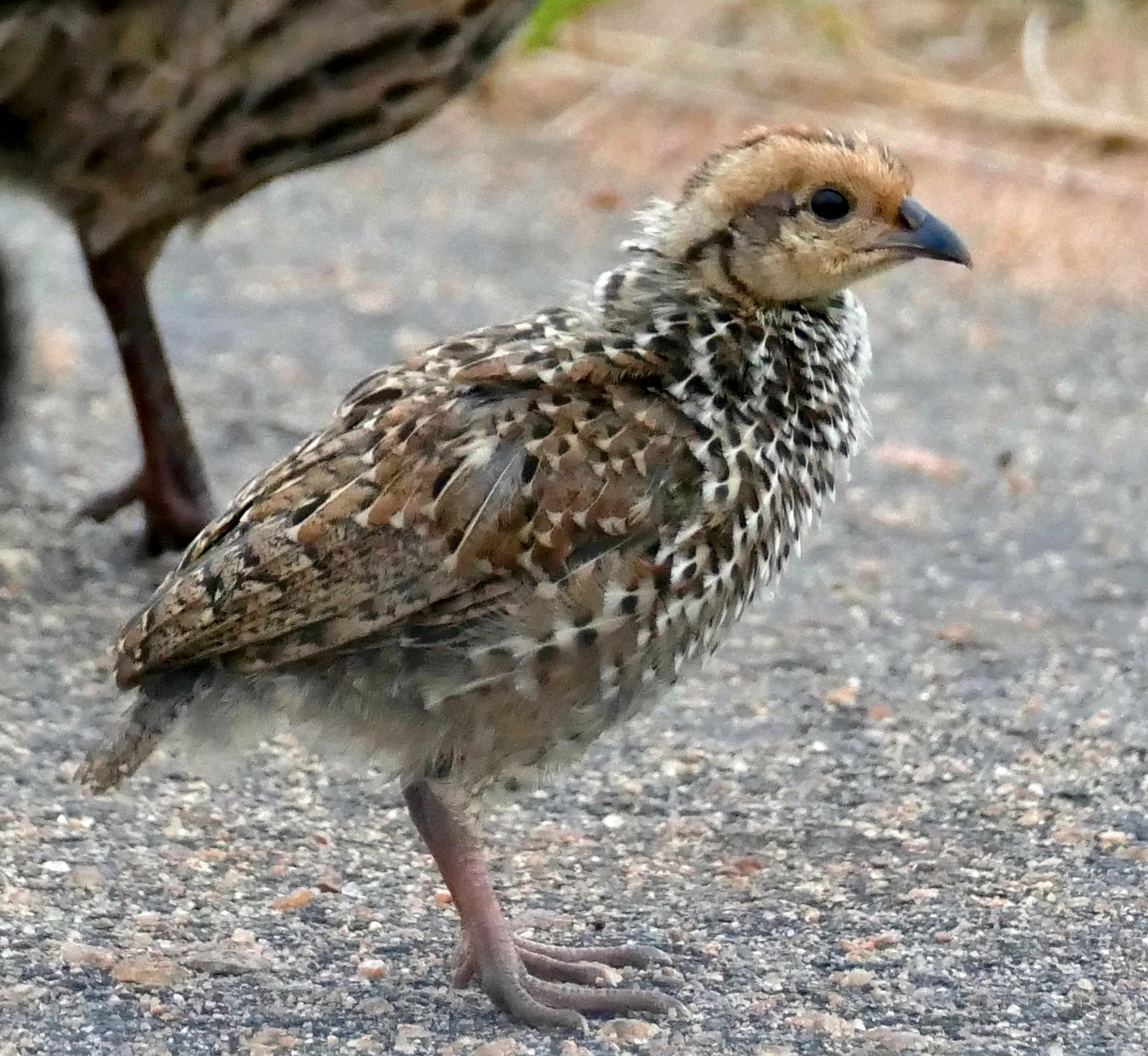
Chick in the Kruger Park

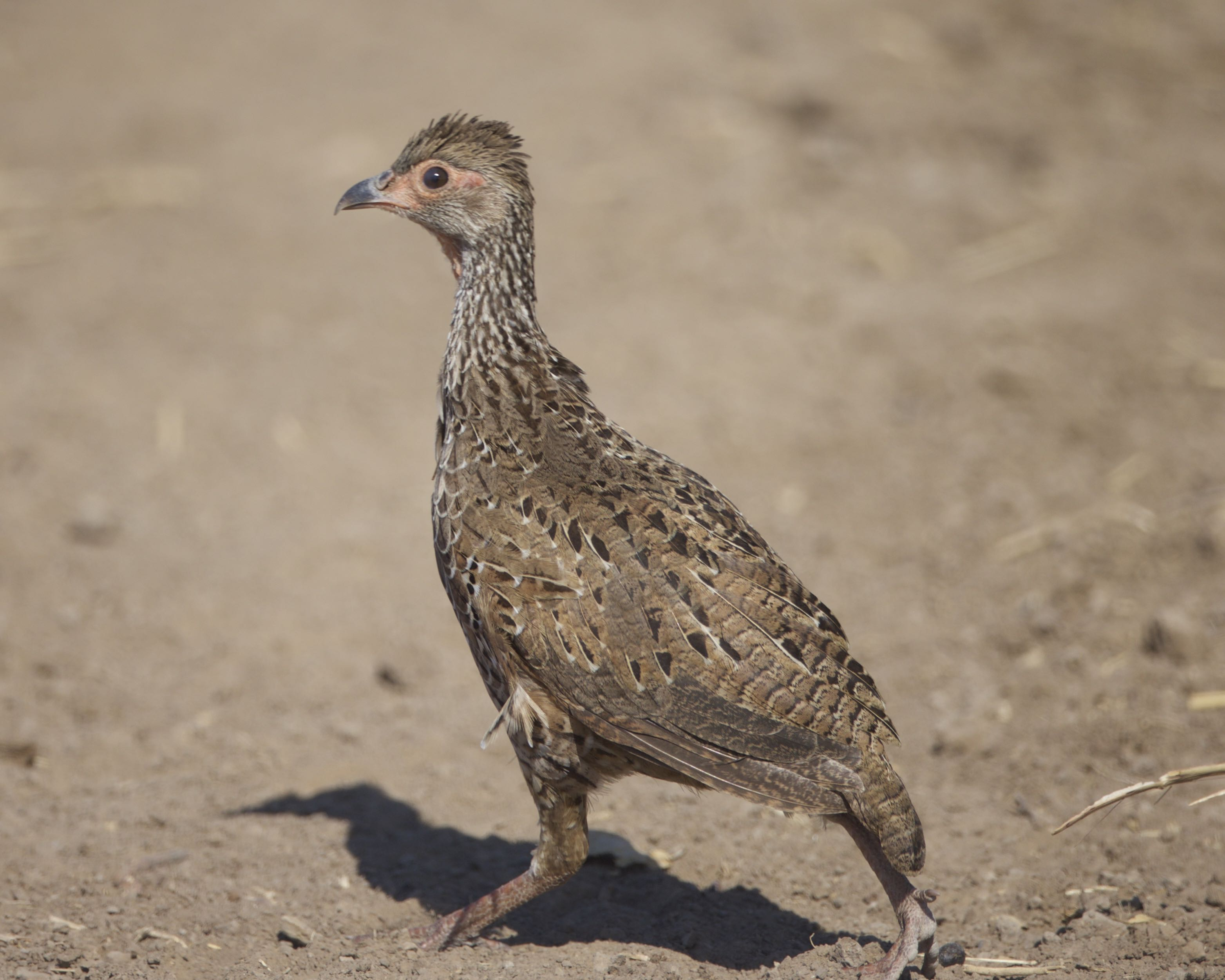
Juvenile bird in Zambia

Swainson's spurfowl was described in 1836 by the Scottish zoologist Andrew Smith and given the binomial name Perdix swainsonii. Smith noted that the spurfowl inhabited the banks of the rivers beyond Kurrichaine (Kaditshwene), the modern province of Limpopo in South Africa. The specific epithet swainsonii was chosen to honour the English naturalist William Swainson. The species is now placed in the genus Pternistis that was introduced by the German naturalist Johann Georg Wagler in 1832. Swainson's spurfowl is treated as monotypic: the proposed subspecies lundazi is not recognised.

One syntype specimen of Perdix Swainsonii Smith (Rep. Exped. Centr. Afr., 1836, p.54.), is held in the collections of National Museums Liverpool at World Museum, with accession number D1587 (male adult). The specimen was collected on the "Banks of Rivers beyond Kurrichaine", Transvaal, South Africa by Andrew Smith. The specimen was purchased at the sale of Smith's South Africa Museum (Lot 128, 6th June 1838) and came to the Liverpool national collection via the 13th Earl of Derby's collection which was bequeathed to the people of Liverpool in 1851. Another syntype, purchased from the South Africa Society, is in the Natural History Museum at Tring and there is also a syntype in National Museums Scotland.
