= Ergtoxin =

Family of toxins

Ergtoxin (CnErg1, CnErgTx1, ErgTx, ErgTx1, ɣ-KTx1.1) is a toxin from the venom of the Mexican scorpion Centruroides noxius. This toxin targets hERG (human Ether- à -go-go-Related Gene) potassium channels.

== Sources ==
The toxin is derived from the venomous gland of the Mexican scorpion Centruroides noxius,

== Chemistry ==
Structural Classification of Proteins ɣ-KTx's Class: Small proteins

  Potassium channel toxins

(triple stranded β-sheet and one to two α-helices)

ɣ-KTx1.1, ɣ-KTx1.2, ɣ-KTx1.4, ɣ-KTx1.6,ɣ-KTx3.2, ɣ-KTx3.3, ɣ-KTx4.2, ɣ-KTx4.3, ɣ-KTx4.4, ɣ-KTx4.5, ɣ-KTx4.8, ɣ-KTx4.9, ɣ-KTx4.10, ɣ-KTx4.11, ɣ-KTx4.13, ɣ-KTx5.1, ɣ-KTx1.3, ɣ-KTx1.5 ɣ-KTx3.1, ɣ-KTx3.4, ɣ-KTx4.1, ɣ-KTx4.6, ɣ-KTx4.7, ɣ-KTx5.2, ɣ-KTx4.12, ɣ-KTx1.7, ɣ-KTx1.8

Species:

Centruroides noxius

Centruroides elegans

Centruroides sculpturatus

Centruroides exilicauda

Centruroides gracilis

Centruroides limpidus

Based on primary sequence alignment, there are 27 different ɣ-KTx's, all of which belong to the larger group of scorpion short chain toxins that affect K^{+} channels (KTx). The first member of this ɣ-KTx family, Ergtoxin (ɣ-KTx1.1), is a polypeptide composed of 42 amino acid residues. It has the following one-letter amino acid code:

DRDSCVDKSRCAKYGYYQECQDCCKNAGHNGGTCMFFKCKCA.

The Ergtoxin sequence contains four disulfide bridges between Cys5-Cys23, Cys11-Cys34, Cys20-Cys39 and Cys24-Cys41 and has a molecular mass of 4730.8 ± 0.4 Da. Ergtoxin displays two clusters of amino acids, one hydrophobic and one hydrophilic. Its structure is stabilized by five hydrogen bonds, HN15-O34, HN33-O40, HN35-O38, HN38-O35, HN40-O33. All of the above data have led to the following prediction for its 3D structure. The tertiary structure of Ergtoxin is comparable to that of another toxin called OSK1, in spite of sharing only 35% sequence identity

== Target ==
Ergtoxin can decrease hERG K+ activity by 50% at a concentration of 10 nM. The binding of Ergtoxin to hERG has been suggested to be dependent on hydrophobic interactions with the channel pore, specifically with a prominently exposed hydrophobic cluster of amino acids (Tyr 14, Phe 36 and Phe 37). It has also been shown that natural oxidation of Met 35 decreases the affinity of the molecule for the hERG K^{+} channels by three orders of magnitude, suggesting that Met35 is a critical residue for either polypeptide 3D folding or interaction of the toxin with the channel.

== Mode of action ==
Ergtoxin effects are a result of the toxin binding to voltage- gated K^{+} channels containing the Kv11.1 alpha subunit encoded by ether-a-go-go-genes (hERG1, hERG2 and hERG3) in the central nervous system of humans. Two concurrent modes of action for the ɣ-KTx's have been reported: 1.) blocking channel conductance by interacting with the outer vestibule of the channel or at the extracellular surface pore domains S5-S6, and 2.) interference with channel gating through interaction with the voltage-sensing domain S1-S4.

== Toxicity ==
Ergtoxin blocks ERG-channels located in endocrine, nerve and heart cells in several species, and is more toxic than CsEKerg1.

== Treatment and therapeutic use ==
Ergtoxin may potentially have a role in treatment of patients with ovarian cancer by inhibiting the proliferation of cells and thus the progression of cancer. However, while hERG K+ channels are expressed by SK-OV-3 cancer cells, the specific mechanisms of channel function in proliferation and potential therapeutic uses for toxins targeting these channels are still not confirmed.
