= CmERG1 =

Neurotoxin

The CmERG1 toxin is a peptide composed of 42 amino acids, found in venom from the Colombian scorpion Centruroides margaritatus. It blocks human ether-a-go-go-Related gene (hERG) potassium channels, which are important for cardiac action potential repolarization.

== Source and etymology ==
CmERG1 (or γ-KTx1.10, due to it being the 10th member of the γ-KTx family) is obtained from the venomous glands of the scorpion C. margaritatus, endemic to the upper and middle area of the Cauca River (Valle del Cauca, Colombia) and the Patía river Valley (Cauca, Colombia). CmERG1 is an acronym composed of the animal species the toxin is derived from, the ion channel type it binds to, and the chronological discovery order.

Based on international classification, the systemic code of CmERG1 is γ-KTx1.10.

== Chemistry ==
CmERG1 is a 42 residue protein, with a molecular weight of 4792.88 Da and is folded by four disulfide bonds. Its primary sequence is as follows:

DRDSCVDKSRCAKYGYFQECTDCCKKYGHNGGTCMFFKCKCA.

CmERG1 is part of the γ-KTx family, which binds selectively to hERG potassium channels.

CmERG1 has a 90.5% homology with CnERG1 (or γ-KTx1.1) and except for F17 (which is a Y in CnERG1), shares the same residues involved in hERG1 binding, namely K13, Y14, Q18, Q21 M35 and F37 However, despite its similarities to other γ-KTxs, CmERG1 almost completely blocks the channel pore at higher concentrations, suggesting that it exhibits a more stable pore-blocking action on hERG1 potassium channels than other members of the γ-KTx family; which typically still allow approximately 10% of the current to pass at saturating concentrations.

== Target ==
Toxins within the γ-KTx family bind selectively to ERG potassium channels, however, CmERG1 has been suggested to have a higher affinity for hERG potassium channels due to its 100% elimination of ionic channel current.

Moreover, the blocking of potassium channels by CmERG1 is fast and reversible, resembling the action of CnERG1 on hERG1. CmERG1 has been found to have an IC50 value of 3.4 ± 0.2 nM and a slope of 1.1 ± 0.05, by fitting dose-response curves with toxin concentrations ranging from 1nM to 1 μM.

== Mode of action ==
Although the difference in the mode of action of CmERG1 from other γ-KTx toxins has not yet been demonstrated beyond speculations from potential changes in binding affinities, the general action of γ-KTx toxins can be viewed under Ergtoxin.

== Toxicity ==
Although the toxicity of purified CmERG1 has not been reported, the toxicity of the venom of C. margaritatus has been investigated, of which CmERG1 is a key, distinguishable ion channel toxin. The toxicity was shown to be different for two populations of the species dependent on their geographical location, and the LD50 was demonstrated to be 42.83 and 59.9 mg/kg for the populations located in the Patia Valley and the Cauca Valley, respectively.

== Therapeutic use ==
It has been shown that hERG channels play a role in cell proliferation, survival and progression in cancers of various organs. Efforts have been made to investigate whether γ-KTxs could be a target for the treatment of ovarian cancer, by inhibiting the proliferation of cells and therefore the development of cancer. Nonetheless, the precise mechanisms underlying hERG channel proliferation in ovarian cancer cells are not yet confirmed.
