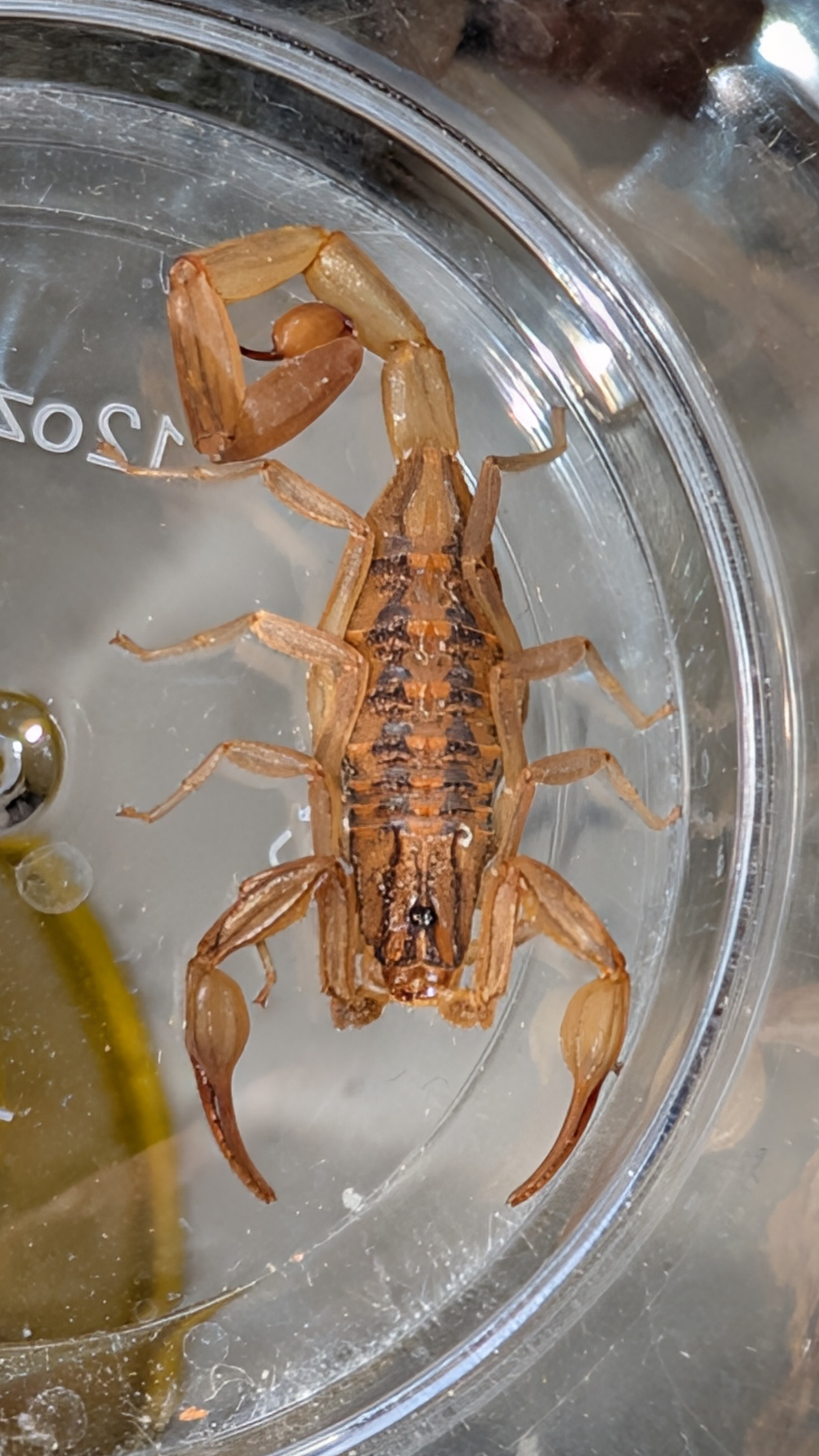

Scientific classification
- Kingdom: Animalia
- Phylum: Arthropoda
- Subphylum: Chelicerata
- Class: Arachnida
- Order: Scorpiones
- Family: Buthidae
- Genus: Centruroides
- Species: C. limpidus

Binomial name
- Centruroides limpidus Karsch, 1879
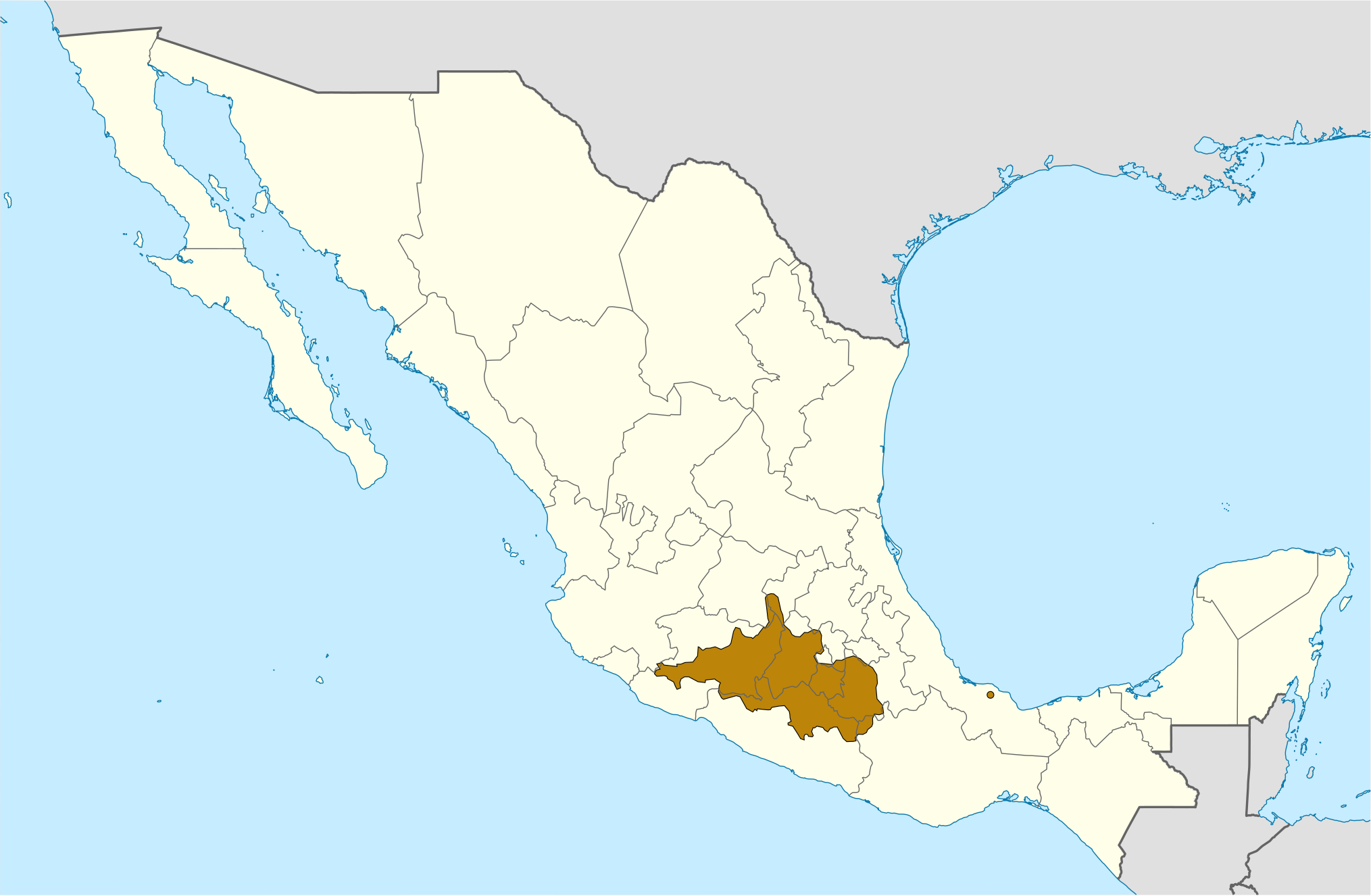

= Centruroides limpidus =

Species of scorpion

Centruroides limpidus, the Morelos scorpion, is a scorpion in the Buthidae family. It is one of the most venomous scorpions in Mexico.

== Description ==
The Morelos scorpion is part of the "striped" group within the bark scorpion genus. It's a medium sized scorpion with a yellow to brown color and has two stripes running down its body (mesosoma), which can be up to 7 centimeters long. Males have between 22 and 26 pectinal teeth, while females have between 20 and 23. Males are also have a thinner stature while the females have a broader mesosoma.

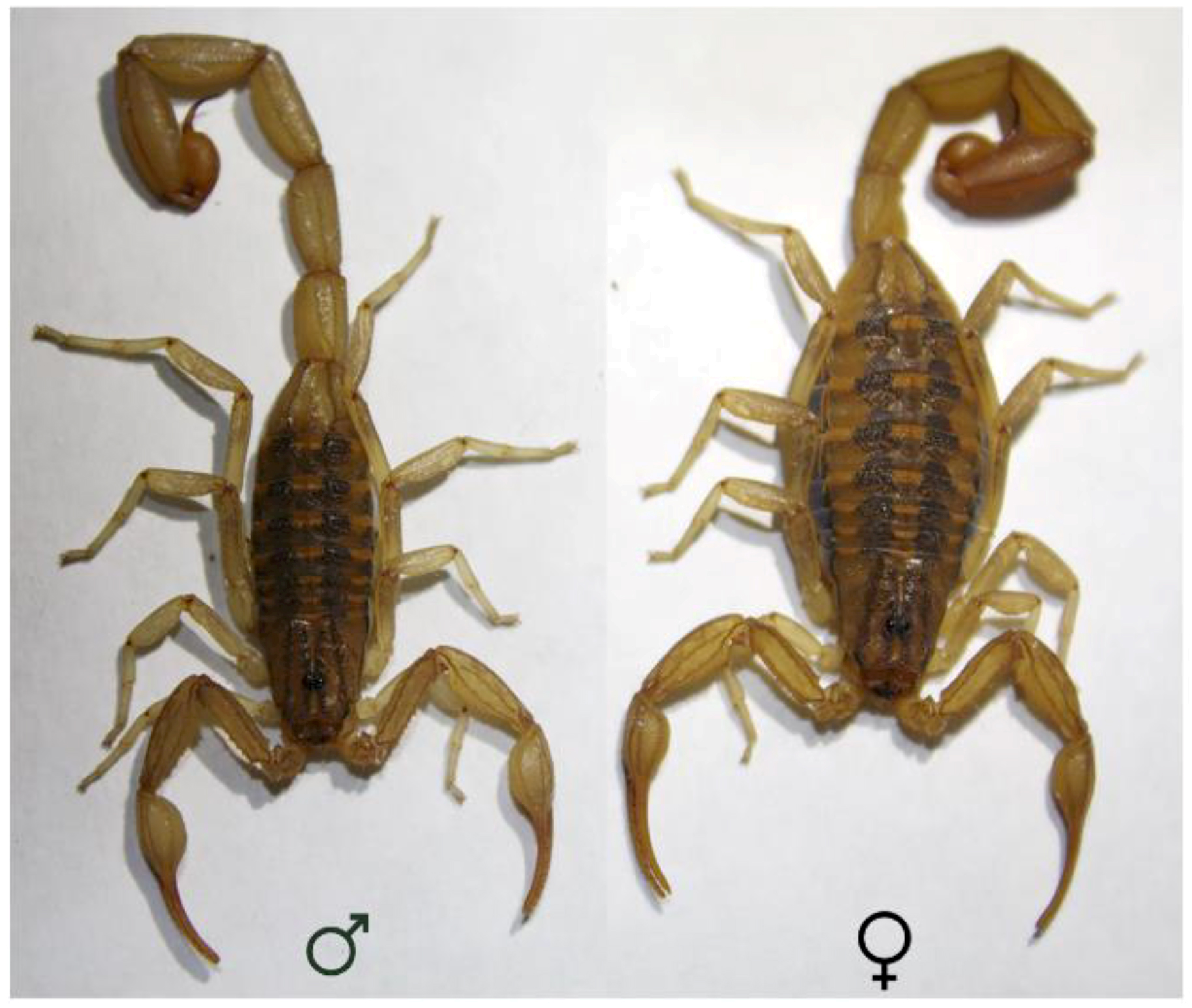

Striped bark scorpions can be hard to distinguish from one another. C. limpidus is distinguished from the visually similar C. infamatus by the four distinct stripes running the length of its head (cephalothorax). Further, the pectinal plate of C. limpidus is more squarish with a dimple whereas the on C. infamatus it is more rectangular and without a dimple.

C. limpidus can also be distinguished from C. tecomanus by the small subaculear tooth on the bulb of its stinger (aculeus). Although C. limpidus is visually similar to C. tecomanus, phylogenetic research has shown that the two are genetically distinct.

=== Etymology ===
The species name limpidus was given by German arachnologist Ferdinand Karsch and means "clear" or "transparent" in Latin. The genus name Centruroides comes from the Greek words kentron, meaning "point" or "sting," and oura, meaning "tail," and is in reference to the subaculear tooth characteristic of the genus.

== Ecology and behavior ==
Centruroides limpidus is primarily found in warm, dry habitats across central Mexico, often in close proximity with humans. In their natural habitat, C. limpidus shelter under rocks, in cracks in the ground, and under loose bark. These locations are also their refuge when the weather gets too hot or too cold.

=== Distribution ===
Centruroides limpidus is endemic to Mexico and can be found in Guanajuato, Guerrero, México, Mexico City, Michoacán, Morelos, Oaxaca, Puebla, Querétaro, Tlaxcala, and Veracruz.

== Diet ==
Centruroides limpidus primarily eats invertebrates.

== Reproduction ==
Like all scorpions, Centruroides limpidus gives birth to live young (viviparous) and can reproduce year round. It is common for the females to have multiple broods per year. Broods can be between 20 and 50 per birth.

== Toxicology ==
Centruroides limpidus is a medically significant scorpion.
