= Centruroides arctimanus =

Scientific classification
- Domain: Eukaryota
- Kingdom: Animalia
- Phylum: Arthropoda
- Subphylum: Chelicerata
- Class: Arachnida
- Order: Scorpiones
- Family: Buthidae
- Genus: Centruroides
- Species: C. arctimanus

Binomial name
- Centruroides arctimanus (Armas, 1976)

Species of scorpion

Centruroides arctimanus is a species of scorpion in the family Buthidae. They dwell in arid coastal areas and islands, from desert steppes to dry coastal forests. The scorpion meet under rocks and fallen trees, and less often under bark. The length of adult males is 30–55 mm and females is 30–40 mm. The entire scorpion is yellow with dark spots of various shapes; on the mesosome and pedipalps, there are usually three longitudinal lines, the cephalothorax, chelicera, legs, and the bottom of the metasoma. The tonality of dark spots in various individuals can vary. In captivity, the species can live up to 2–3 years.
