= Centruroides farri =

Scientific classification
- Domain: Eukaryota
- Kingdom: Animalia
- Phylum: Arthropoda
- Subphylum: Chelicerata
- Class: Arachnida
- Order: Scorpiones
- Family: Buthidae
- Genus: Centruroides
- Species: C. farri

Binomial name
- Centruroides farri (Armas, 1976)

Species of scorpion

Centruroides farri is a species of scorpion in the family Buthidae.
