= Centruroides alayoni =

Scientific classification
- Domain: Eukaryota
- Kingdom: Animalia
- Phylum: Arthropoda
- Subphylum: Chelicerata
- Class: Arachnida
- Order: Scorpiones
- Family: Buthidae
- Genus: Centruroides
- Species: C. alayoni

Binomial name
- Centruroides alayoni (Armas, 1999)

Species of scorpion

Centruroides alayoni is a species of scorpion in the family Buthidae.

== Description ==
Centruroides alayoni is a moderate-sized scorpion, with a typical length of 7 centimetres (2.8 in). Its sandy dull brown colour matches the surrounding environment, giving it camouflage protection. Its pedipalps are small relative to its size, indicating that it instead uses its stinger to subdue its prey. It has a potent venom, capable of killing a dog in a single sting, if not a human.
