= Centruroides hoffmanni =

Scientific classification
- Kingdom: Animalia
- Phylum: Arthropoda
- Subphylum: Chelicerata
- Class: Arachnida
- Order: Scorpiones
- Family: Buthidae
- Genus: Centruroides
- Species: C. hoffmanni

Binomial name
- Centruroides hoffmanni (Armas, 1996)

Species of scorpion

Centruroides hoffmanni is a species of scorpion in the family Buthidae. The species can be found in the states of Chiapas and Oaxaca, Mexico. The specific name is taken from the Spanish name of the municipality from which the holotype originates. Hoffmanni can be distinguished by its unique telson and subaculear tubercle shaping. This species is yellow overall with a brown marbling on the carapace. It was originally compared with Centruroides thorelli, but may actually be more closely related to C. infamatus.
