= Centruroides luceorum =

Scientific classification
- Kingdom: Animalia
- Phylum: Arthropoda
- Subphylum: Chelicerata
- Class: Arachnida
- Order: Scorpiones
- Family: Buthidae
- Genus: Centruroides
- Species: C. luceorum

Binomial name
- Centruroides luceorum Armas, 1999

Species of scorpion

Centruroides luceorum is a species of scorpion in the family Buthidae. Centruroides luceorum is native to Central America, sightings of the scorpion have been recorded in Florida (USA), Cuba, Panama, Guatemala, Honduras, Colombia, Venezuela and El Salvador.
