= CssII =

Toxin derived from scorpion venom

Centruroides suffusus suffusus β-toxin II
SCOP classification
- Class: Small proteins
- Fold: Knottins (small inhibitors, toxins, lectins)
- Superfamily: Scorpion toxin-like
- Family: Long-chain scorpion toxins
- Protein: CssII
- Species: Centruroides suffusus suffusus
- UniProt: P08900

Centruroides suffusus suffusus toxin II (CssII) is a scorpion β-toxin from the venom of the scorpion Centruroides suffusus suffusus. CssII primarily affects voltage-gated sodium channels by causing a hyperpolarizing shift of voltage dependence, a reduction in peak transient current, and the occurrence of resurgent currents.

== Sources ==
Centruroides suffusus suffusus is a Mexican scorpion from the genus Centruroides belonging to the family Buthidae. C. suffusus suffusus has at least seven different β-toxins, of which CssII is considered the major toxin in the venom affecting mammals. The single gene for CssII has been identified, and cloned using E. coli, resulting in recombinant CssII.

== Chemistry ==
CssII is a single chain miniprotein, consisting of 66 amino acids:

Lys-Glu-Gly-Tyr-Leu-Val-Ser-Lys-Ser-Thr-Gly-Cys-Lys-Tyr-Glu-Cys-Leu-Lys-Leu-Gly-Asp-Asn-Asp-Tyr-Cys-Leu-Arg-Glu-Cys-Lys-Gln-Gln-Tyr-Gly-Lys-Ser-Ser-Gly-Gly-Tyr-Cys-Tyr-Ala-Phe-Ala-Cys-Trp-Cys-Thr-His-Leu-Tyr-Glu-Gln-Ala-Val-Val-Trp-Pro-Leu-Pro-Asn-Lys-Thr-Cys-Asn

It has four disulfide bridges and its scaffold is formed by a single α-helix, and a three-stranded β-sheet structure. Typical for Css β-toxins, no methionine and isoleucine amino acids occur in the miniprotein. CssII’s characteristics include the replacement of proline in position 59 with tyrosine, differentiating it from all other α- and β-toxins. Moreover, glutamine (position 32) and histidine (position 57) replace lysine and glycine residues respectively, differentiating CssII from all other β-toxins. The protein is amidated at the C-terminal end. CssII has been successfully produced in E.coli, resulting in a recombinant variant of CssII. rCssII is not amidated at the C-terminal, resulting in a slightly lower weight. Recombinant CssII was shown to exhibit similar toxicity as native CssII. However, His tagged CssII (HisrCssII) was shown to be less toxic to mice

== Target ==
CssII targets voltage-gated sodium channels, and has the highest affinity for Nav1.6 channels. CssII is thought to bind to a receptor site only accessible when the sodium channel is in its open state. Within this site Css toxin is hypothesized to bind to the residues of the IIS3-S4 loop, as well as the extracellular IIS4 end. Nav1.6 channels are primarily expressed in the central nervous system, as well as the heart and glia cells.

== Mode of action ==
As CssII is a β-toxin, it binds to site 4 on the sodium channel, thus primarily affecting the voltage sensor domain of the channel. It is thought that CssII binding to the voltage sensor domain is dependent on a conformational change of the sodium channel. The binding to site 4 induces a negative shift in voltage dependence, resulting in the aberrant opening of sodium channels. In addition, CssII reduces the peak transient current of the Nav1.6 channels, and causes the occurrence of resurgent currents in cells that otherwise would not exhibit this behavior. These effects might arise from different channel binding sites for CssII, as the effects on the resurgent current occur earlier than the left shift of activation, and the transient peak current reduction. However, these additional binding sites have not yet been defined. Also, CssII might indirectly affects the reuptake of GABA. This interaction is thought to be due to a change in membrane potential which inhibits sodium dependent reuptake of GABA.

== Toxicity ==
The LD50 in mice is 25 μg/kg for subcutaneous injections, and .60 μg/kg for intracerebroventricular injections. Bark scorpion venom is generally considered neurotoxic, and stings can be fatal. Buthidae stings are highly prevalent, especially in Mexico, with more than 200,000 stings annually.

== Treatment ==
C. suffusus suffusus can be treated by antivenom, such as Alacramyn. A non-toxic recombinant variant of CssII, that is able to displace native CssII, facilitates the production of specific antibodies that could protect against the C. suffusus suffusus sting.
