= Cll2 =

Toxin found in scorpion venom

Beta-toxin Cll2 (Cll2)

Identifiers
- Organism: Centruroides limpidus limpidus
- Symbol: N/A
- UniProt: 6876
Search for
- Structures: Swiss-model
- Domains: InterPro

Beta-toxin Cll2, shortened to Cll2, is a toxin in the venom of the Mexican scorpion species Centruroides limpidus limpidus. The toxin belongs to the β-class family of sodium channel-inhibiting scorpion toxins. It affects voltage-dependent activation, conductance and resurgent currents of voltage gated sodium channels by binding to site 4.

== Etymology and Source ==
Cll2 is named after the venom produced by the species Centruroides limpidus limpidus, a Mexican scorpion. Cll1 and Cll2 are both derived from this venom. The Centruroides limpidus limpidus species is a member of the only genus that represents a life hazard to humans in Mexico, and is mainly found in the state of Morelos.

== Chemistry ==
Cll2 belongs to the beta-type of sodium channel-inhibiting scorpion toxins. The Cll venom consists of six fractions, of which only Cll2 is lethal, amounting to ~42% of the venom. Cll2 consists of thirteen sub-fractions, of which sub-fraction 9 is the largest. The molecular weight of Cll2 is about 7600 Da. The primary structure of the Cll2 toxin (toxin II.9) is:

KEGYLVNHST	GCKYECFKLG	DNDYCLRECK	QQYGKGAGGY	CYAFGCWCNH	LYEQAVWPL	PKKTCN

== Target ==
Like other scorpion beta toxins (beta-ScTxs), Cll2 targets voltage-gated sodium channels (VGSCs). It specifically binds to and alters the Na_{v}1.6 channel, as well as, but to a lesser extent, other Nav isoforms. It binds to the extracellular end of the ISS4 (loop between the third and fourth segment) voltage sensor and locks it in the activated outward position. This binding location is commonly referred to as VGSC site 4.

== Mode of action ==
Cll2 binding to the ISS4 shifts the voltage dependence of activation to more negative values. In addition, Cll2 shows a blocking effect on the peak transient current and it can increase the resurgent current in the Na_{v} 1.6 isoform. The toxin can induce a resurgent current in Na_{v}1.1 and to a lesser extent in the Na_{v}1.2 and Na_{v}1.4 isoforms.

Cll2 has slight differences compared to Cll1 in its mode of action. Cll2 caused a current reduction in Na_{v}1.6 and to a lesser extent in Na_{v} 1.1, Na_{v} 1.4 and Na_{v} 1.5. Cll1, on the other hand, influences the channels Na_{v} 1.1 to Na_{v} 1.6 all in an equal way.

== Toxicity ==
The LD_{50} for Cll is 3.30 mg/kg. The Cll venom consists of six components, of which only Cll2 is lethal. Cll 2 consists of thirteen sub-fractions, of which sub-fraction 9-13 are toxic. Sub-fraction 13 is only toxic to crustaceans (sweet water shrimps).

== Treatment ==
The single chain variable antibody fragment (scFv) ER-5 was recently created by mutating earlier used scFVs which were used against other Mexican scorpion toxins. This scFv ER-5 was found to have a neutralizing effect on both Cll1 and Cll2.
