= NTX =

NTX may refer to:

- NTX (group), a South Korean boy group
- Ntx (trigraph)
- N-terminal telopeptide, a biomarker used to measure the rate of bone turnover
- Nereistoxin, a natural product toxin
- Nitazoxanide, an antimicrobial drug
- North Texas
- Noxiustoxin, a scorpion toxin
- Raden Sadjad Airport (IATA: NTX), Natuna Island
- Somra language (ISO 639:ntx), spoken in Burma
