= Hongotoxin =

Scorpion toxin

Hongotoxin (HgTX) is an ion channel toxin, which blocks Shaker-type (K_{v}1) K^{+} channels. The toxin is derived from the venom of Centruroides limbatus, a Central American scorpion found meanly in Costa Rica, Honduras and Panama.

== Chemistry ==
Hongotoxin belongs to the short scorpion toxin superfamily. Potassium channel inhibitor family. Alpha-KTx 2 subfamily.

There are five subtypes known of the hongotoxin peptide. HgTX_{1} is 39 amino acids long and shows an overall amino acid sequence homology of 89% to margatoxin (MgTX).

== Target ==
Hongotoxin (HgTX) targets are Shaker-type (K_{v}1) K^{+} channels.

HgTX_{1} shows high affinity with K_{v}1.1, K_{v}1.2, K_{v}1.3 voltage-gated potassium channels, but much lower affinity with K_{v}1.6 (see table 1 and 2).

HgTX_{2}, HgTX_{3}, HgTX_{4} and HgTX_{5} are potent selective inhibitors of Kv1 voltage-gated potassium channels (By similarity).

table 1		IC_{50}		
	K_{v}1.1	K_{v}1.2	K_{v}1.3	K_{v}1.6
HgTX_{1}	31	170	86	6,000
MgTx	144	675	230	ND

ND, not determined. All measurements in pM

table 2		K_{i}		
	K_{v}1.1	K_{v}1.2	K_{v}1.3	K_{v}1.6
HgTX_{1}	0.08	0.09	0.24	8.7
MgTx	0.52	0.21	0.31	9.4

All measurements in pM

== Mode of action ==
The mode of action is not yet known.
