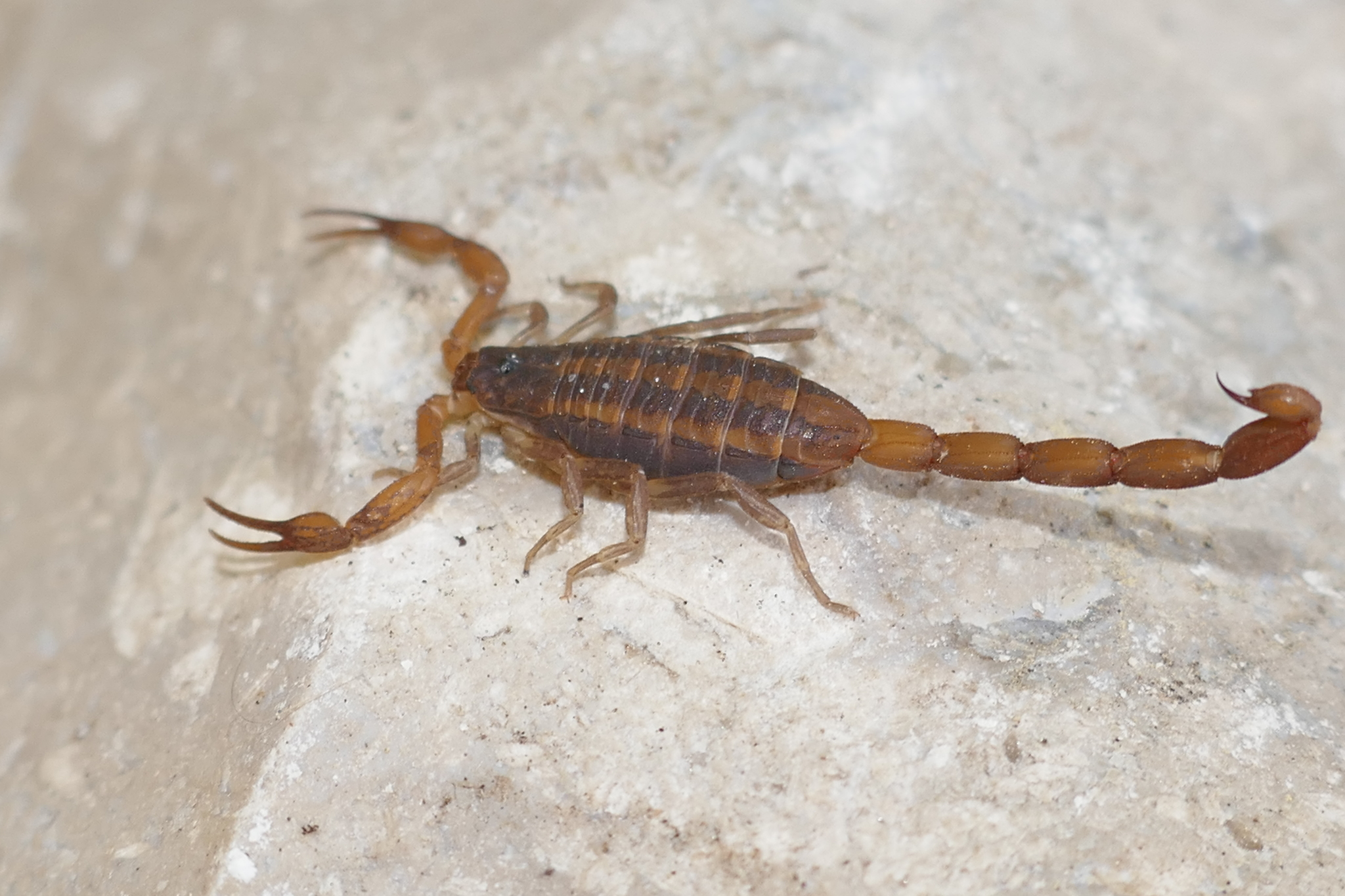

Scientific classification
- Kingdom: Animalia
- Phylum: Arthropoda
- Subphylum: Chelicerata
- Class: Arachnida
- Order: Scorpiones
- Family: Buthidae
- Genus: Centruroides
- Species: C. hentzi

Binomial name
- Centruroides hentzi (Banks, 1900)

= Centruroides hentzi =

Species of scorpion

Centruroides hentzi, the Hentz striped scorpion, is a species of bark scorpion in the family Buthidae. They are native to the southeastern United States including the states of Florida, southwestern Alabama, and in the coastal plain of Southern Georgia including surrounding barrier islands. C. hentzi is present in other states such as North Carolina and South Carolina due to accidental human importations.

In Florida, C. hentzi is sympatric with two other species of Centruroides: the Florida bark scorpion (C. gracilis) and the Guiana striped scorpion (C. guianensis).

== Description ==
The color of the carapace is a uniformly light mottled brown with lines that spread out anteriorly and laterally from a yellow median stripe. The chelicerae and legs are marbled with brown reticulation while the underside of the legs are unmarked and pale.

This species of scorpion also exhibits sexual dimorphism. Males have smaller and more slender bodies with long metasomal segments while females tend to be larger with short, rounded metasomal segments. Males tend to measure around 37 mm with 18 pectinal teeth while females measure around 38.9 mm with 17 pectinal teeth.

== Habitat ==
Centruroides hentzi are often found living under logs, stones, tree snags, and litter on the ground. They can also be found under bark on standing dead trees up to 20 feet off of the ground or under the bark at the base of live Pinus elliottii and Pinus palustris. This scorpion is a common invader of households and other constructed environments.

== Diet ==
Centruroides hentzi feeds on insects such as cockroaches, termites, and crickets.

== Predators ==
Predators of the scorpion include the federally endangered Picoides borealis and the non-native Osteopilus septentrionalis. The first observed documentation of predation on a species of scorpion by an assassin bug was reported with Centruroides hentzi and Microtomus purcis.

== Venom ==
Centruroides hentzi has evolved to use their venom primarily for defense or predation. Between C. hentzi populations, there has been a recorded significant variation in their venom with a larger significance among populations geographically separated. Significant differences in venom composition of females and males between all populations has also been recorded, suggesting venom genes may be sex-specific in C. hentzi. Venom regeneration in C. hentzi takes at least 14 days.

Stings to humans are painful and may cause discomfort but do not have long lasting effects or severe medical consequences.
