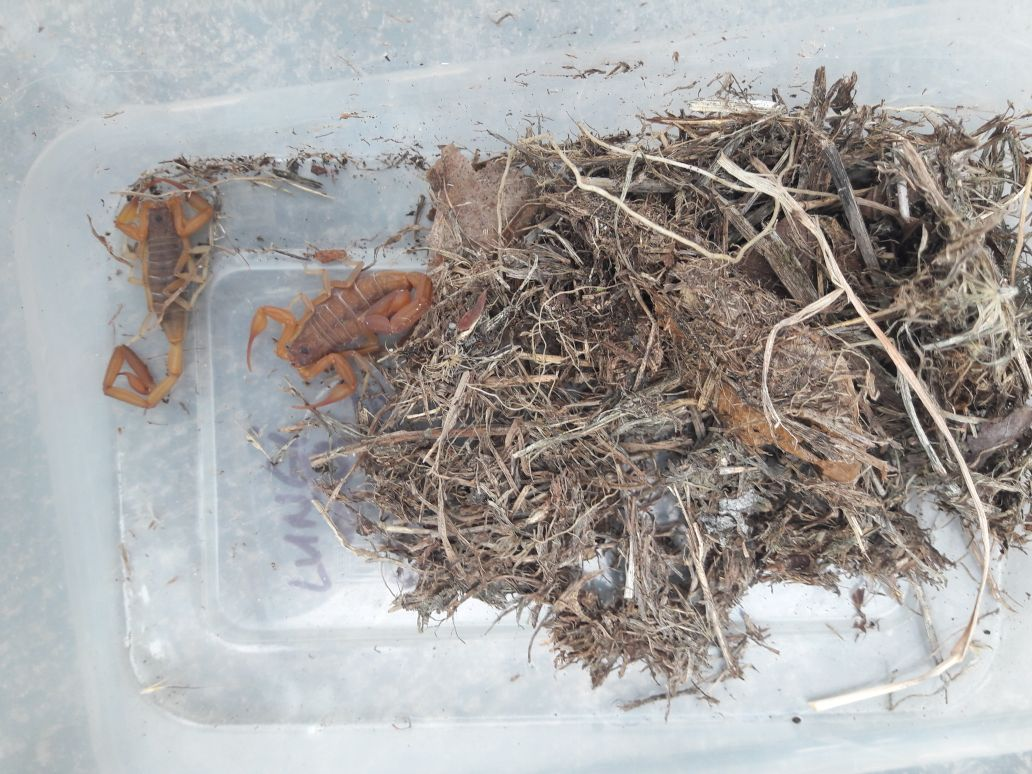

Scientific classification
- Kingdom: Animalia
- Phylum: Arthropoda
- Subphylum: Chelicerata
- Class: Arachnida
- Order: Scorpiones
- Family: Buthidae
- Genus: Centruroides
- Species: C. barbudensis

Binomial name
- Centruroides barbudensis Pocock, 1898

= Centruroides barbudensis =

Species of scorpion

Centruroides barbudensis is a species of scorpion in the family Buthidae.

It possesses excitatory neurotoxins that act on sodium and potassium channels. Toxic catecholamine-release can cause adrenergic cardiac effects.

== Distribution ==
This species is endemic to the Lesser Antilles. It is found in Sombrero, Anguilla, Saba, Sint Eustatius, Saint-Martin, Saint-Barthélemy, Antigua, Barbuda, Guadeloupe and Martinique
