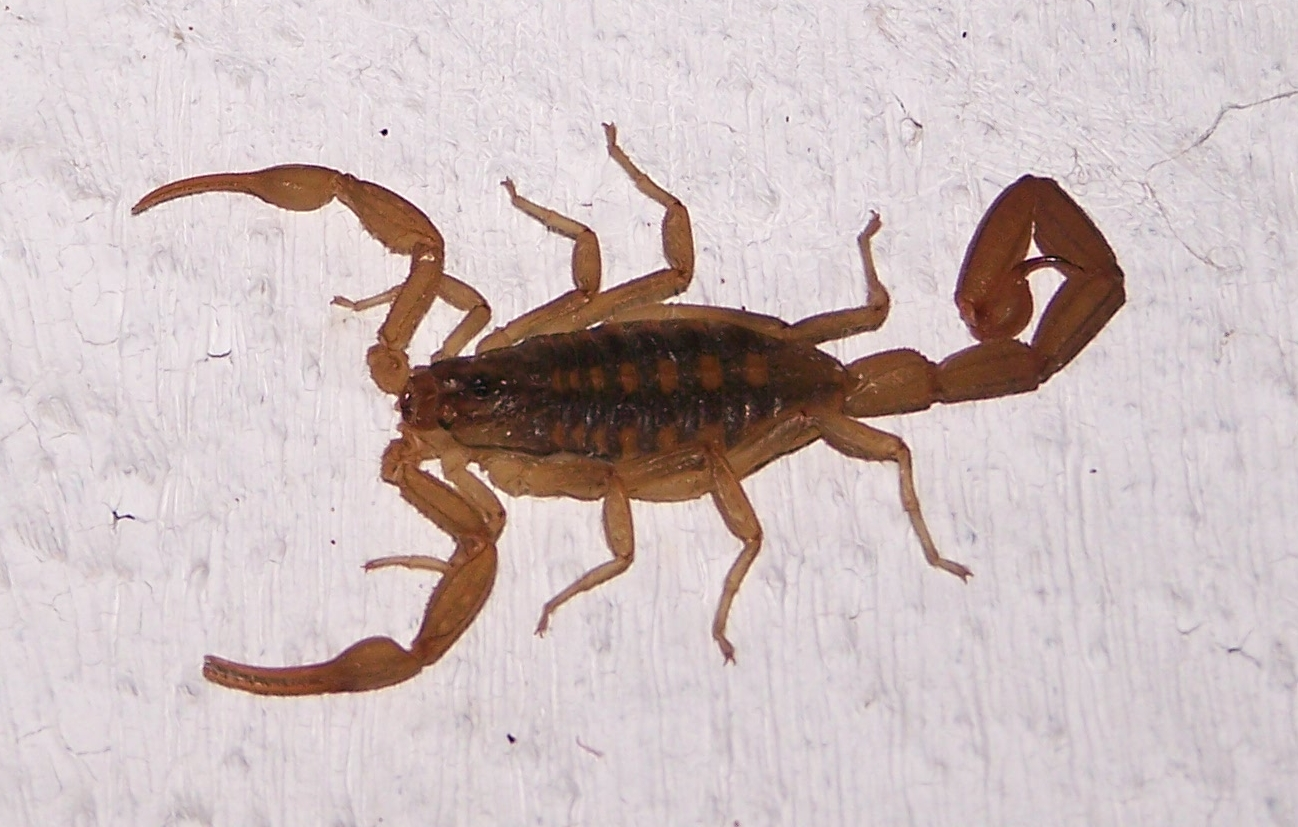

Scientific classification
- Domain: Eukaryota
- Kingdom: Animalia
- Phylum: Arthropoda
- Subphylum: Chelicerata
- Class: Arachnida
- Order: Scorpiones
- Family: Buthidae
- Genus: Centruroides
- Species: C. suffusus

Binomial name
- Centruroides suffusus (Pocock, 1902)

= Centruroides suffusus =

Species of scorpion

Centruroides suffusus, sometimes referred to as the Durango Scorpion or the Mexican scorpion, is a species of scorpion in the family Buthidae.

Centruroides suffusus is the most predominant and venomous species of scorpions in the city of Durango, Mexico. Because of this, their venom, such as CssII, is used for multiple research purposes. The process of obtaining their venom is called scorpion milking, and in Durango, Mexico, milking this scorpion's venom via electrical stimulation is the preferred method.
