= Beta-mammal toxin Cn2 =

Primary toxin in the venom of the Centruroides noxius scorpion

Cn2 toxin

Identifiers
- Organism: Centruroides noxius
- Symbol: ?
- PDB: 1CN2
- UniProt: P01495
Search for
- Structures: Swiss-model
- Domains: InterPro

Beta-mammal toxin Cn2, also known as Cn2 toxin, is a single chain β-scorpion neurotoxic peptide and the primary toxin in the venom of the Centruroides noxius Hoffmann scorpion. The toxin specifically targets mammalian Na_{v}1.6 voltage-gated sodium channels (VGSC).

== Etymology and source ==
Cn2 is a neurotoxin named after and derived from the Centruroides noxius scorpion, which originates from and is endemic in the state of Nayarit, Western Mexico. This scorpion produces a venom in which the Cn2 toxin is the most abundant component; it comprises approximately 6.8% of the scorpion venom. Cn2 toxin is one of the most noxious peptides against mammals. Cn2 was initially purified and sequenced under the name of toxin II.9.2.2.

== Chemistry ==
Scorpion toxins affecting the gating mechanisms of sodium channels are classically divided in two major classes: α- and β-scorpion toxins. However, many functional variations of these peptides have been demonstrated, with almost 10 different toxin subgroups that can be separately listed. Cn2 is generally categorized as a β-scorpion toxin composed of a single chain polypeptide consisting of 66 amino acids,

The Cn2 toxin comprises a triple-stranded antiparallel β-sheet, a short α-helix, and four disulfide bridges. Two of these disulfide bridges contribute to maintaining the relative position of one of the β-sheet and α-helix. The third disulfide bridge binds the long loop between the first β-sheet and α-helix to the C-terminus, while the fourth binds this loop to the third β-sheet. The Cn2 peptide contains many aromatic residues: seven tyrosine residues, two tryptophan residues and one phenylalanine residue. These residues form two hydrophobic patches, a hydrophobic core, two positive patches, and a negative patch in the protein, which have been extensively described.

== Target ==
Cn2 specifically targets the mammalian voltage-gated sodium channel (VGSC) Na_{v}1.6.

== Mode of action ==
It is likely that Cn2 binds most strongly to the extracellular loop between the S3 and S4 segments when the channel is in depolarized state. CssIV, a β-toxin that shares 57 out of 66 amino acid residues with the Cn2 toxin according to NMR analysis, mainly binds to the extracellular loop between the S3 and S4 segments within the second domain of the target voltage-gated sodium channel. The activation curve of the channel shifts to more hyperpolarized potentials upon binding of the neurotoxin. Thus, only when a depolarizing pulse is applied before Cn2 administration, the current threshold of the target channels shifts from -30 mV to -60 mV in control versus 140 nM Cn2, respectively. An explanation for this phenomenon is that the Cn2 toxin ‘traps’ the voltage sensor in activated position when it binds the extracellular loop in activated position, as has been hypothesized for β-toxins in general. The Cn2 toxin also produces a resurgent current and a reduction in peak inward current in the Na_{v}1.6 channel. All these changes seem to increase the excitability of the neurons. However, in Purkinje cells Cn2 can induce an inactivation block in a stimulation paradigm that in control conditions induced regular firing.

== Toxicity and treatment ==
=== Toxicity ===
Cn2 toxin is highly toxic to mammals with a reported LD_{50} of 0.25-0.32 μg/20g mouse.

=== Treatment ===
Single-chain variable fragments (scFvs) have been used to recognize and neutralize Cn2 from Centruroides noxius venom. Specifically, scFv RU1 and LR have shown to complement each other, showing a better neutralization capacity when administered simultaneously. These two scFvs have affinities in the picomolar range and remove most scorpion toxin poisoning symptoms. When administered as treatment for the Cn2 toxin, survival percentages range from 90-100%
