= Microtominae =

Scientific classification
- Kingdom: Animalia
- Phylum: Arthropoda
- Clade: Pancrustacea
- Class: Insecta
- Order: Hemiptera
- Suborder: Heteroptera
- Family: Reduviidae
- Subfamily: Microtominae; Schumacher, 1924

Subfamily of true bugs

Microtominae is a subfamily of assassin bugs in the family Reduviidae. There are at least 2 genera and about 19 described species in Microtominae.

== Genera ==
These two genera belong to the subfamily Microtominae:

- Homalocoris Perty, 1833
- Microtomus Illiger, 1807
