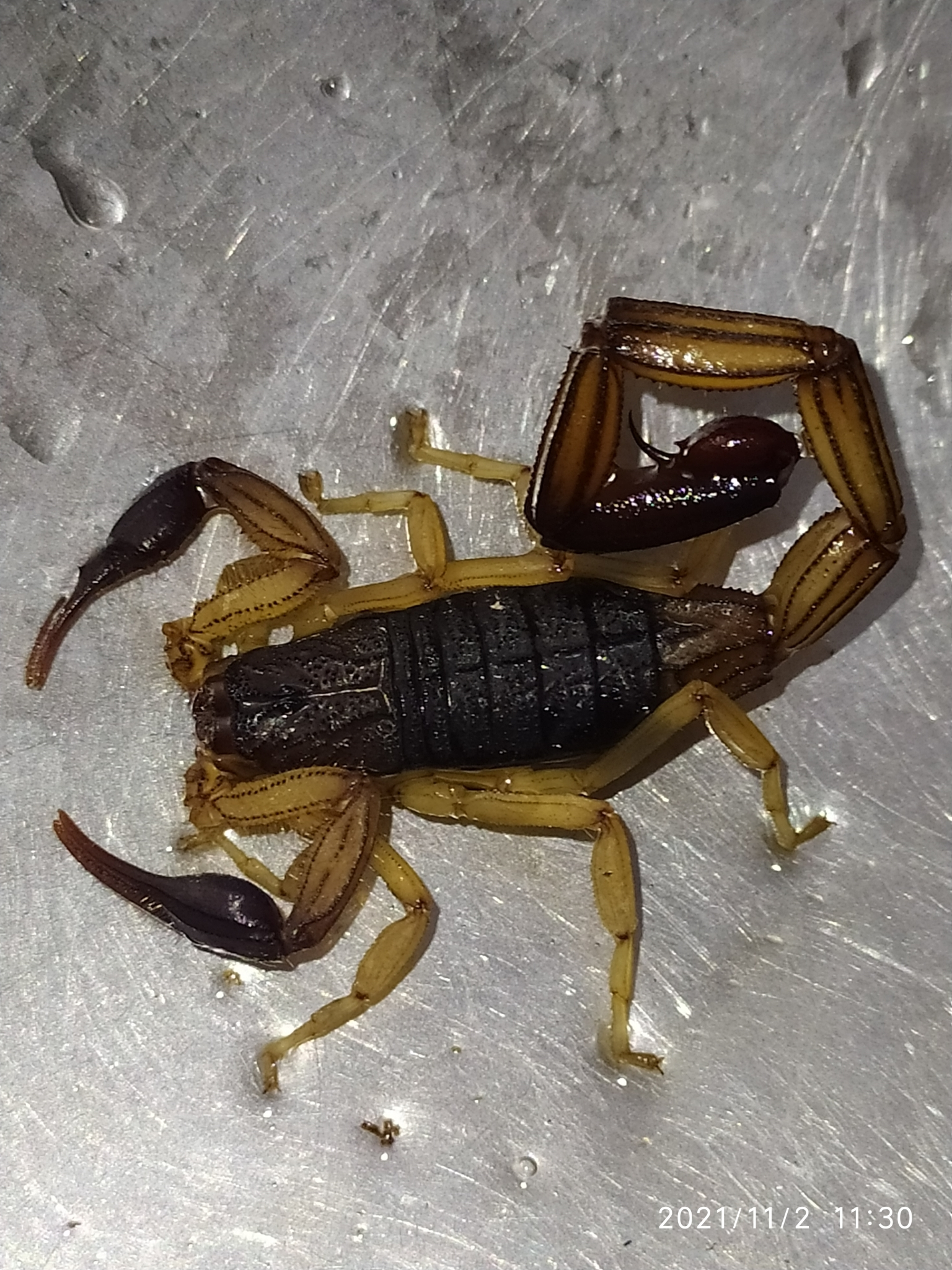

Scientific classification
- Kingdom: Animalia
- Phylum: Arthropoda
- Subphylum: Chelicerata
- Class: Arachnida
- Order: Scorpiones
- Family: Buthidae
- Genus: Centruroides
- Species: C. edwardsii

Binomial name
- Centruroides edwardsii (Gervais, 1843)

Synonyms
- Scorpio (Atreus) edwardsii Gervais, 1843; Scorpio (Atreus) degeerii Gervais, 1844; Tityus ducalis C.L. Koch, 1844; Centrurus gambiensis Karsch, 1873; Centruroides margaritatus septentrionalis Hoffmann, 1932; Rhopalurus danieli Prado et Rios-Patiño, 1940; Centruroides danieli Mello-Leitã, 1945; Centruroides gracilis Flórez, 1990

= Centruroides edwardsii =

Species of scorpion

Centruroides edwardsii is a species of scorpion in the genus Centruroides found from Mexico to Colombia.

== Description ==
Centruroides edwardsii is a relatively large species of scorpion, with adults reaching between 6.0 cm and 10.5 cm in length. Most of the body and the pedipalps are reddish brown while the legs are yellow. Males are larger than females.

== Distribution and habitat ==
Centruroides edwardsii occurs throughout Central America from northwestern Mexico to central Colombia. It is found in diverse habitats, including tropical dry forest, desert, and rainforest, and occurs from sea-level to 1,728 metres (5,669 ft). C. edwardsii does well in human-modified landscapes and is frequently encountered in urban environments and human dwellings. Introduced populations occur in Cuba and Senegal.

== Ecology ==
Scorpions in the genus Centruroides primarily prey upon insects, but C. edwardsii has occasionally been documenting consuming small vertebrates including the snake Tantilla armillata and anole lizards.

== Venom ==
The venom of C. edwardsii has hemolytic activity and has been demonstrated to cause paralysis in both arthropods and small vertebrates. Due to its frequent co-occurrence with humans, C. edwardsii frequently stings people in some regions. It's venom may be dangerous to children under 15.
