= Noxiustoxin =

Toxin from the venom of the scorpion Centruroides noxius

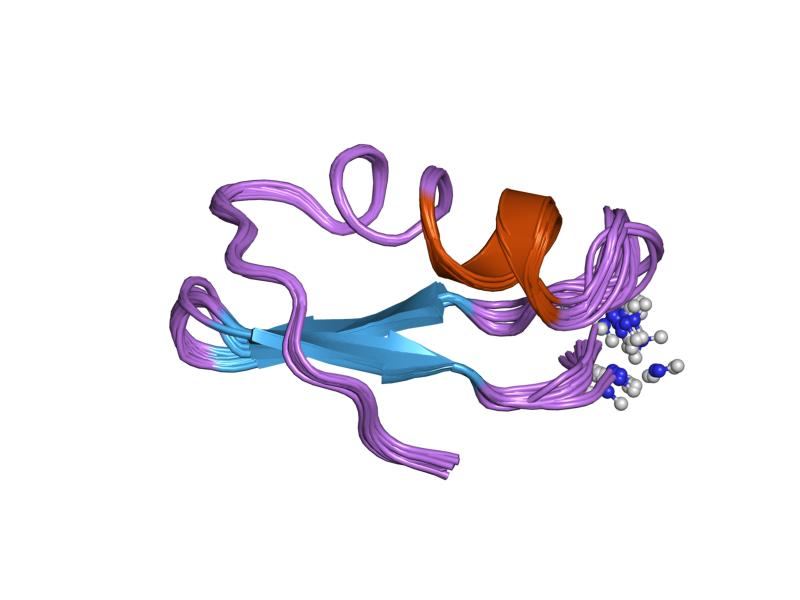
3D molecular structure of noxiustoxin.

Noxiustoxin (NTX) is a toxin from the venom of the Mexican scorpion Centruroides noxius Hoffmann which block voltage-dependent potassium channels and calcium-activated potassium channels.

Synonyms	NTx; NXT; NXT-1; Toxin II.11; Potassium channel toxin alpha-KTx 2.1.
Organism	Centruroides noxius Hoffmann (Mexican scorpion)
CAS Number	85205-49-8 (143074-44-6)
Protein Data Bank	1SXM
UniProt ID	P08815
Molar Mass	4195.06
Chemical Formula	C_{174}H_{286}N_{52}O_{54}S_{7}
Amino Acid Sequence	TIINVKCTSPKQCSKPCKELYGSSAGAKCMNGKCKCYNN-NH2 (Cys7-Cys29, Cys13-Cys34, Cys17-Cys36)

== Sources ==
NTX was first purified from homogenized crude venom extract of the Mexican scorpion Centruroides noxius Hoffmann, found in the Mexican state of Nayarit. NTX accounts for only about 1% of the scorpion venom. NTX is one of the best-studied toxic peptides from scorpion venoms. It was the second purified toxin obtained from the genus Centruroides after neurotoxin II and the first short peptide from scorpion venom to be reported in the literature. The name for noxiustoxin was first proposed in 1982, before which it was known as toxin II-11

== Chemistry ==
NTX is a peptide consisting of 39 amino acid residues. It has a molar mass of 4195.06 and the following primary amino acid sequence: TIINVKCTSPKQCSKPCKELYGSSAGAKCMNGKCKCYNN-NH2. The sequence of NTX contains no histidine, arginine, tryptophan, or phenylalanine. NTX has three disulfide bridges (Cys7-Cys29, Cys13-Cys34, Cys17-Cys36) and contains an amidated C-terminus. NTX is similar in sequence to the margatoxin (79% identity), the kaliotoxin (51% identity), the charybdotoxin (49% identity), and the iberiotoxin (38% identity). The three-dimensional solution structure of NTX has been solved by nuclear magnetic resonance (NMR).

== Target ==
NTX blocks the pore of several types of voltage-gated K^{+} channels by reversibly binding to the channel receptor site. Furthermore, it affects calcium-activated potassium channels of skeletal muscles. In the squid axon, NTX was found to have relatively low binding affinity with their target site on the channel protein (KD = 300nM).

== Mode of action ==
NTX associates reversibly with K^{+} channels and thus decreases K+ permeability in brain synaptosomes. The location of the active site of NTX is not completely known yet. However, it is believed to be located close to the N-Terminal portion of the toxin as administration of synthetic-nonapeptide NTX_{1-9}, which corresponds to the N-Terminal sequences of NTX, leads to symptoms of intoxication that are very similar to native NTX, while a second synthetic active fragment, corresponding to the C-Terminal of NTX, did not lead to symptoms of intoxication.

Furthermore, the mode of action of NTX is thought to be concentration dependent. K+ currents are found to be blocked by NTX at concentrations lower than 1.5 μM in a voltage-independent manner and above 1.5 μM in a voltage-dependent manner. The blocking of K+ channels by NTX is never complete, which indicates that NTX is either not able to fully block a channel or that not all channels have a receptor site for NTX.

== Toxicity ==
LD_{50} of the venom is 0.26 μg/g in albino mice after intraperitoneal injection. Intoxication symptoms of mice include hyperexcitability, lacrimation, convulsions, salivation, dyspnea, and eventually death by respiratory paralysis.

== Treatment ==
Although the venom of Centruroides noxius Hoffmann is the most toxic of all the Mexican scorpions, it is less medically important, because Centruroides noxius does not cohabitate with humans

== Medical significance ==
It is suggested that due to structural similarity between toxins, a vaccine against Centruroides noxius could be efficient against other, more dangerous, Centruroides species that cause more public health problems.
