= Microtomus luctuosus =

Scientific classification
- Kingdom: Animalia
- Phylum: Arthropoda
- Clade: Pancrustacea
- Class: Insecta
- Order: Hemiptera
- Suborder: Heteroptera
- Family: Reduviidae
- Genus: Microtomus
- Species: M. luctuosus

Binomial name
- Microtomus luctuosus (Stål, 1854)

Species of true bug

Microtomus luctuosus is a species of assassin bug in the family Reduviidae. It is found in Central America, South America and North America.
