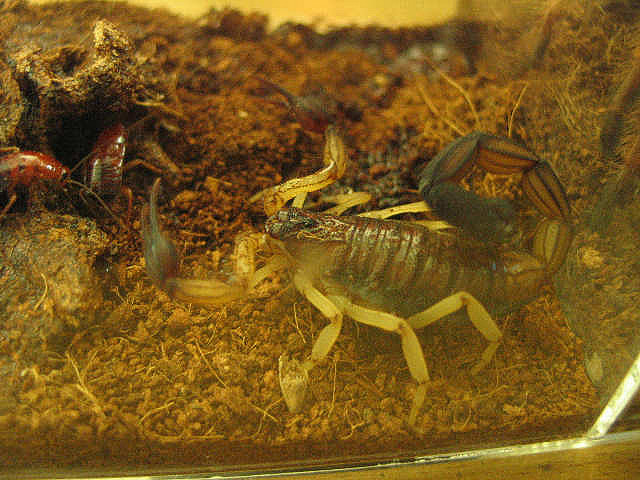
- Centruroides bicolor in captivity

Scientific classification
- Domain: Eukaryota
- Kingdom: Animalia
- Phylum: Arthropoda
- Subphylum: Chelicerata
- Class: Arachnida
- Order: Scorpiones
- Family: Buthidae
- Genus: Centruroides
- Species: C. bicolor

Binomial name
- Centruroides bicolor Pocock, 1898

= Centruroides bicolor =

Species of scorpion

Centruroides bicolor is a species of bark scorpion from Central America. Its specific name "bicolor" is from the Latin meaning "two colored" and refers to the markings of this species.

== Range ==
This species is concentrated on the southern Pacific coast of Costa Rica and Panama.

== Habitat ==
Within its range, C. bicolor can be found the forest understory, where it can be found among the vegetation. It is also known to frequent houses and other building where shelter and food are abundant. It has been recorded from sea level to 1,670 meters (5,480 feet).

== Description ==
Centruroides bicolor is a relatively large scorpion and grows up to 120 mm in length. It has a very showy coloration. Most of its body is yellowish in color, except for its blackish pincers, final tail segments, cephalothorax and part of the abdomen. It has been described as "very beautiful scorpion"

== Venom ==
The venom contains excitatory toxins that release catecholamines, causing adrenergic cardiac effects. An antivenom was developed by Mexican company Bioclon.

== Captivity ==
Though one expert guesses that "this species is probably not kept in captivity by hobbyists", this species is indeed bred and kept as a pet.

== Reproduction ==
Prior to mating, members of this species engage in a courtship dance that can last for several minutes and sometimes an entire day or more. As part of this ritual the scorpions repeatedly raise and cross their tails, push and pull at one another, and then separate. Eventually, after a series of contractions, the male produces an off-white spermatophore, which contains sperm and hardens on contact with air. After this packet of sperm is introduced to the female's genital opening she becomes aggressive towards her mate and sometimes devours him in an episode of sexual cannibalism.

Gestation for this species takes 60 – 90 days. After being born, immature individuals instinctively climb up to the back of the mother and stay there until their first molt. Females have been observed carrying over fifty of their young in this manner.

== Similar species ==
Centruroides bicolor belongs to the Gracilis species group. All of the species in this group are characterized by their long, narrow pedipalps and overall relatively large size. C. limbatus closely resembles C. bicolor but these two species can be discerned from each other by the color of the pincers as well as more subtle characteristics.

== Bibliography ==
- Viquez, Carlos, Escorpiones de Costa Rica, ISBN 9968-702-21-8
