= Centruroides nigrescens =

Scientific classification
- Kingdom: Animalia
- Phylum: Arthropoda
- Subphylum: Chelicerata
- Class: Arachnida
- Order: Scorpiones
- Family: Buthidae
- Genus: Centruroides
- Species: C. nigrescens

Binomial name
- Centruroides nigrescens Pocock, 1898

Species of scorpion

Centruroides nigrescens is a species of scorpion in the family Buthidae. It is native to Mexico.

== Distribution and habitat ==
Centruroides nigrescens is endemic to Mexico. It is primarily found across states such as Guerrero and Michoacán.

Young Centruroides nigrescens can tolerate dry conditions well, however adults tend to thrive in more humid environments.
