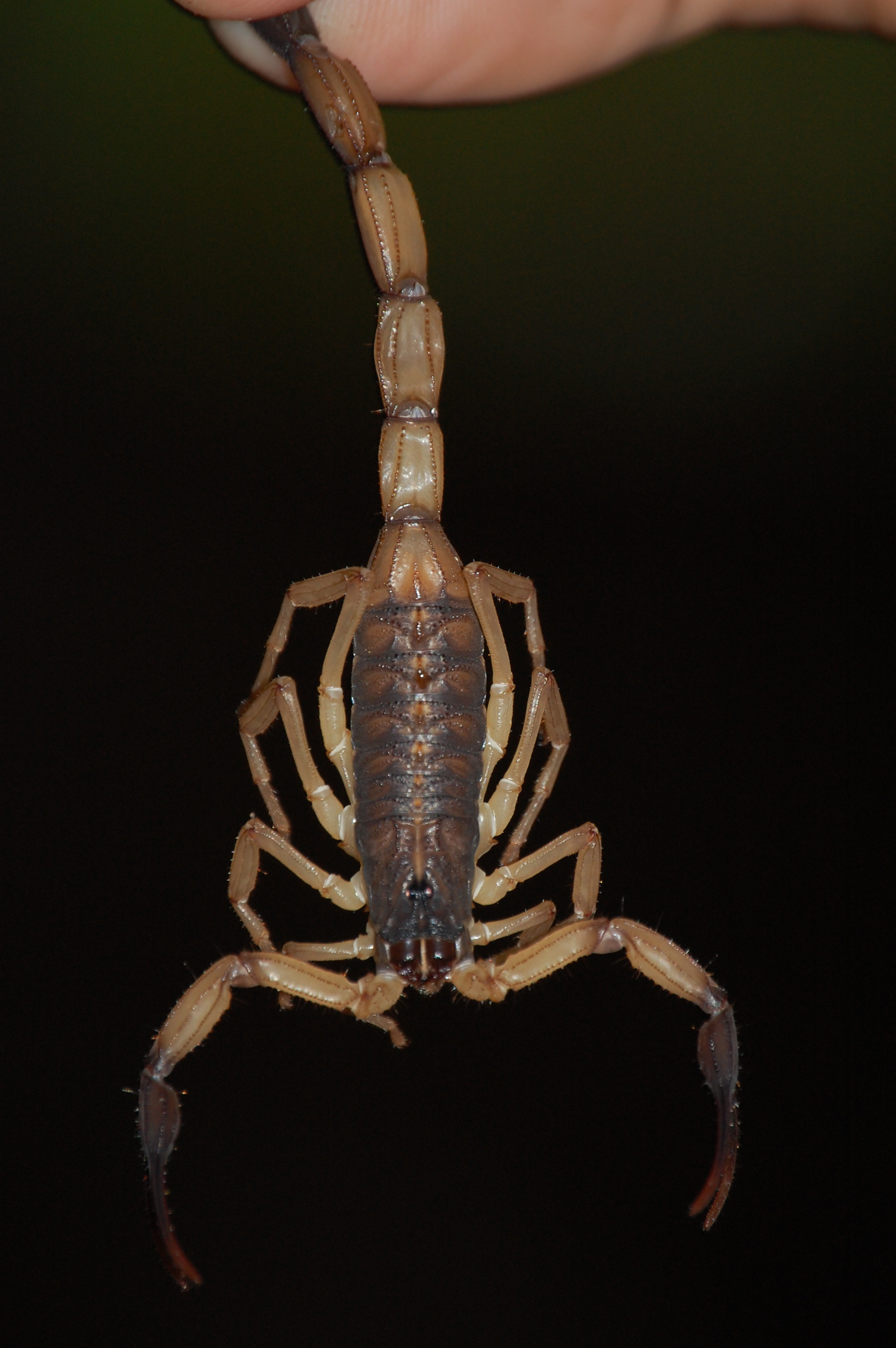
- Centruroides limbatus in the Osa Peninsula, Costa Rica

Scientific classification
- Domain: Eukaryota
- Kingdom: Animalia
- Phylum: Arthropoda
- Subphylum: Chelicerata
- Class: Arachnida
- Order: Scorpiones
- Family: Buthidae
- Genus: Centruroides
- Species: C. limbatus

Binomial name
- Centruroides limbatus (Pocock, 1898)

= Centruroides limbatus =

Species of scorpion

Centruroides limbatus is a species of bark scorpion from Central America. Its specific name "limbatus," is from the Latin meaning "black-edged," and refers to the darkly colored markings of this species.

== Range ==
This species can be found in Costa Rica, but can also be found in Nicaragua and Panama. Websites indicate Honduras but no apparent published reports. In at least one case, this species is responsible for an emergency room visit in the United States (see below), but it is not indicated if the scorpion in question was a member of an introduced population or came from an isolated release (e.g. a lone individual introduced accidentally or a pet kept in captivity).

== Habitat ==
Within its range, C. limbatus is a common predator in the vegetation of the forest understory, where it can be found among the vegetation. It is also known to frequent houses and other building where shelter and food are abundant. C. limbatus is a diurnal species that spends night hiding in cracks and crevices. It has been recorded from sea level to 1400 meters.

== Description ==
Centruroides limbatus is a relatively large scorpion and grows up to 110 mm in length. It is a polymorphic species that comes in a wide range of colors. Typically they have yellowish bodies with a contrasting blackish color on chelicera, the fingers of the pedipalps, the fifth segment of the tail, and the cephalothorax. Some individuals are paler over all, and some other individuals are darker overall and display a bluish-black color. Numerous chromatic variations can be found between these two extremes.

== Venom ==
A researcher associated with the Smithsonian Institution assures that "this species is not considered dangerous to humans" but warns that nonetheless that they "are venomous and being stung by one is no picnic." According to another researcher's firsthand account of being stung while trying to capture a subadult specimen near Tortuguero, Costa Rica:

There was immediate pain, as if being penetrated by a thorn much larger than the actual sting. The site of the sting felt tight and as if it was burning, although there was little visible inflimation [sic]. After approximately an hour, the pain had subsided to the point where I was more aware of a sensation of tingling like when you stick your tongue on a 9V battery. After an additional half hour, the pain and tingling had subsided to the point where my thumb felt like it had a sealed paper cut on it -- where moving my thumb felt odd but keeping it still was without much sensation. Several hours later, this too had subsided and I felt nothing. At no point did I experience any systemic effects, nor did the symptoms extend beyond the initial sting site -- not even as far as my first joint on my thumb.

In an unusual case reported by the Loma Linda University School of Medicine, a 67-year-old woman presented to a community emergency department in Orange County, California after being envenomed by a scorpion identified as a member of this species. Her reaction seems more serious than that implied in the above assessments and may be due to anaphylactic shock. According to a report:

She developed local pain and systemic symptoms, including parasthesias, flushing, hypertension, and wheezing...Severe systemic signs of envenomation by Centruroides sp. may include respiratory difficulty, somatic neuromuscular dysfunction, and cranial nerve dysfunction. Patients stung by dangerous scorpions may require airway support, extended observation, antivenom, and avoidance of respiratory depressive medications.

The report also notes "Scorpions have been reported to be accidentally transported to areas where they are not indigenous, and patients may present anywhere with envenomation by dangerous scorpion species." A case of scorpion sting to the palm of the hand of a scuba diver occurred while trying on a wetsuit on the Osa Peninsula. Symptoms reported include localized pain for several hours with severity decreasing after the first hour. Localized tingling sensation was reported as well. Treatment several hours after envenomation with Therapik, a toxin-denaturing device utilizing heat, resulted in complete resolution of symptoms. (Feb 19,2016)

== Similar species ==
C. limbatus belongs to the gracilis species group. All of the species in this group are characterised by their long, narrow pedipalps and overall, relatively large size. C. bicolor closely resembles C. limbatus but these two species can be discerned from each other by the color of the pincers as well as more subtle characteristics.

== Captivity ==
Although a source at the Norwegian University of Science and Technology guesses that "this species is probably not kept in captivity by hobbyists" this species is indeed bred in captivity.

== See also ==
- Hongotoxin

== Original publication ==
- Pocock, 1898 : Descriptions of some new Scorpions from Central and South America. Annals and Magazine of Natural History, ser. 7, vol. 1, p. 384-394 (texte intégral).

== Bibliography ==
- Viquez, Carlos, Escorpiones de Costa Rica, ISBN 9968-702-21-8
