= Centruroides nigrimanus =

Scientific classification
- Domain: Eukaryota
- Kingdom: Animalia
- Phylum: Arthropoda
- Subphylum: Chelicerata
- Class: Arachnida
- Order: Scorpiones
- Family: Buthidae
- Genus: Centruroides
- Species: C. nigrimanus

Binomial name
- Centruroides nigrimanus Pocock, 1898

Species of scorpion

Centruroides nigrimanus is a species of scorpion in the family Buthidae. This species is endemic of Mexico (type from Oaxaca). It occurs in the Mexican states of Chiapas, Oaxaca and Guerrero. [Pocock 1998 indicated a juvenile specimen from Honduras might be this species, but this has never been substantiated, and unlikely]

== Original publication ==
- Pocock, 1898 : Descriptions of some new Scorpions from Central and South America. Annals and Magazine of Natural History, ser. 7, vol. 1, p. 384-394 (texte intégral).
