= Centruroides noxius =

Scientific classification
- Domain: Eukaryota
- Kingdom: Animalia
- Phylum: Arthropoda
- Subphylum: Chelicerata
- Class: Arachnida
- Order: Scorpiones
- Family: Buthidae
- Genus: Centruroides
- Species: C. noxius

Binomial name
- Centruroides noxius Wood, 1863

Species of arachnid

Centruroides noxius is a species of scorpion native to Mexico.

== Description and behavior ==
This species grows from 3.5 to 5 cm in length, its body is dark in color, usually black or brown, and its legs and pedipalps are generally light, this species does not have a specific color pattern since it can be found with other colors. Since most scorpions are nocturnal, they usually hide in litter and debris, or in loose barks of trees and bushes, it is mostly terrestrial, but it has also been reported to rise on rough surfaces.

== Distribution and habitat ==
This species is native to Mexico, in the states of Nayarit, but also in Jalisco and Sinaloa. it is also found in other Latin American countries, such as Chile, but it is not known how it got there. It is mainly found in dry arid places, areas of limited vegetation, in sandy and rocky soil and sometimes in human dwellings, it has been reported close to sea level, with 500 m elevation.

== Reproduction ==
Mating lasts about 10 minutes, with the male controlling the female with his tweezers to avoid being bitten by her, they reach sexual maturity between 8–11 months of age, reproduction is ovoviviparous, with a gestation period of 4–5 months, the female of the aluz between 30 and 60 pups. the puppies become independent at two or three weeks of age, as they can be eaten by the mother.

== Diet ==
It feeds mainly on small invertebrates, such as crickets, spiders and beetles. juveniles usually feed on micro-crickets and small flies.

== Venom ==
It is one of the most venomous scorpions in Mexico and one of the most dangerous in Latin America, it has highly lethal neurotoxins for mammals, which attacks the sodium and potassium channels, the venom changes the functioning of nerves and muscles, to the point of the respiratory system and the heart stop working. This species has a median lethal dose of 5 micrograms for 20-gram mouse. Two peptide toxins have been identified in the venom: noxiustoxin, which targets voltage-gated calcium channels and calcium-activated potassium channels, and Cn2 toxin, which targets the mammalian voltage-gated sodium channel (VGSC) Nav1.6.
