= Centruroides baergi =

Scientific classification
- Domain: Eukaryota
- Kingdom: Animalia
- Phylum: Arthropoda
- Subphylum: Chelicerata
- Class: Arachnida
- Order: Scorpiones
- Family: Buthidae
- Genus: Centruroides
- Species: C. baergi

Binomial name
- Centruroides baergi Hoffman, 1932

Species of scorpion

Centruroides baergi is a species of scorpion in the family Buthidae. They are commonly found in highlands and are almost exclusively found in the states of Oaxaca and southern Puebla, Mexico. C. baergi is the most abundant scorpion of the genus in the state of Oaxaca, making up a third of Centruroides reported between 2008 and 2014.

== Venom ==
The three main toxins that make up the venom of C. baergi are beta toxins. These toxins modify the activation threshold of sodium channels, making the channels more likely to open when normally they would not. Since sodium channels are widely found in the peripheral nervous system, their opening can lead to severe autonomic dysfunction. The two most harmful of these toxins can not be neutralized by the currently available antibodies, likely due to the venom not being deemed medically important.

Some of the symptoms of a sting include intense pain, salivation, vomiting, breathing difficulties, tightness in the chest, muscle stiffness, tingling and sweating.
