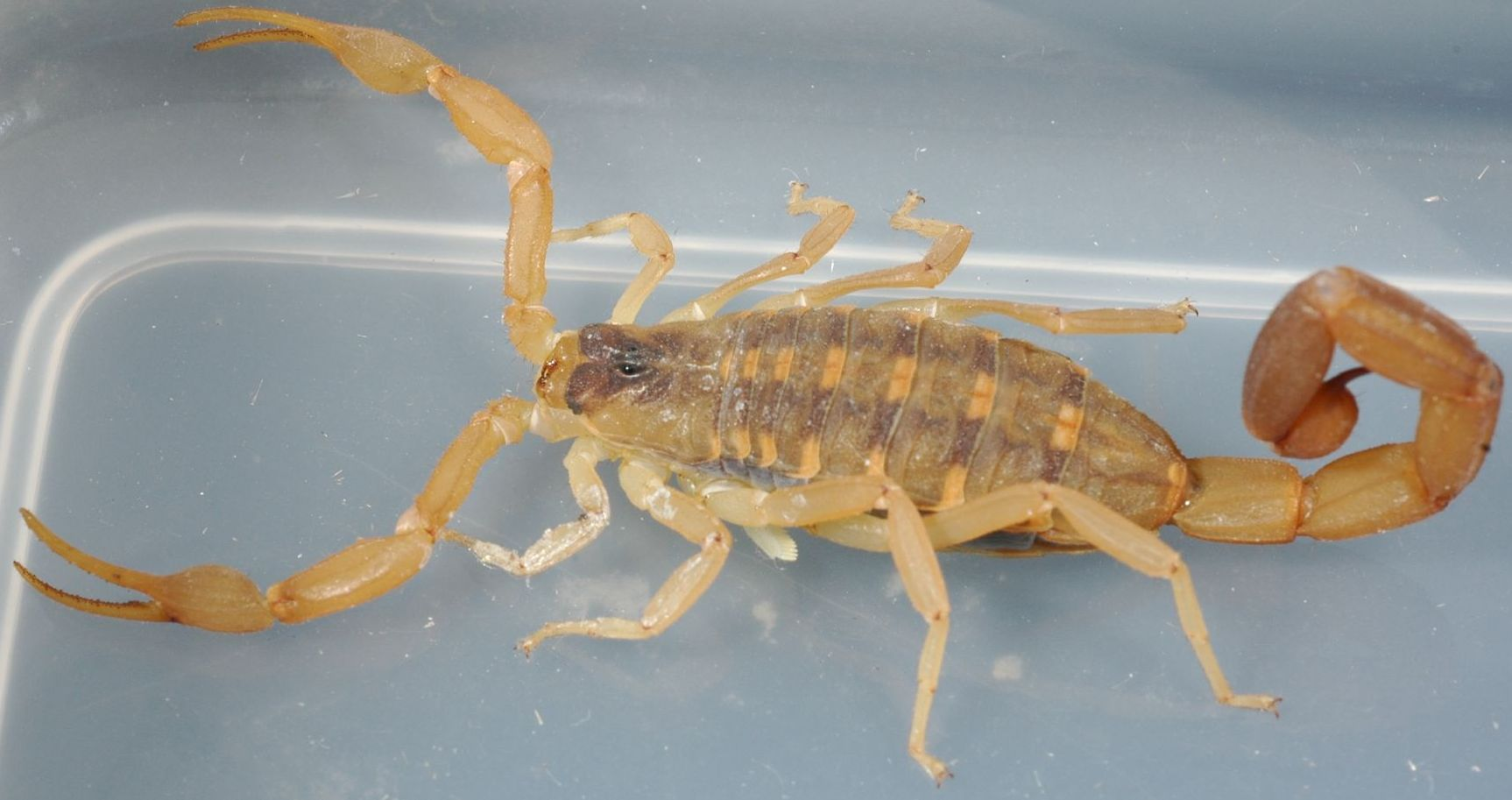

Scientific classification
- Kingdom: Animalia
- Phylum: Arthropoda
- Subphylum: Chelicerata
- Class: Arachnida
- Order: Scorpiones
- Family: Buthidae
- Genus: Centruroides
- Species: C. vittatus

Binomial name
- Centruroides vittatus (Say, 1821)

= Striped bark scorpion =

Species of scorpion

The striped bark scorpion (Centruroides vittatus) or Texas bark scorpion is an extremely common scorpion found throughout the midsection of the United States and northern Mexico. It is perhaps the most frequently encountered scorpion in the U.S.

== Appearance ==
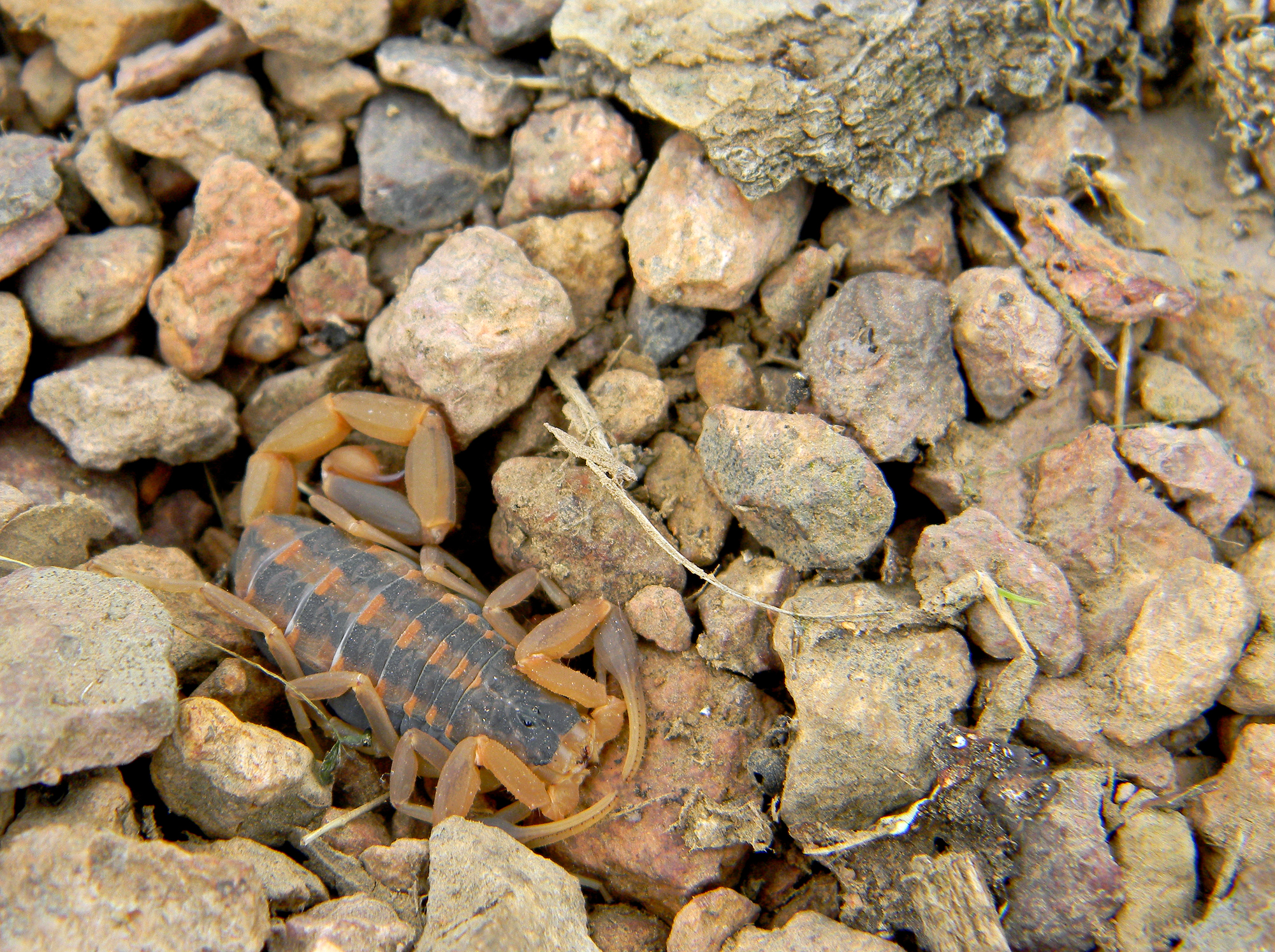
A striped scorpion hiding among rocks at Taum Sauk Mountain State Park

A medium-sized scorpion that is rarely longer than 70 mm (up to around 2 3/4 in), the striped bark scorpion is a uniform pale-yellow scorpion that can be identified by two dark, longitudinal stripes on its carapace, with a dark triangle above the ocular tubercle. Minor variations on this theme occur, however; specimens that are lighter-colored and lack the characteristic stripes have been described as separate species in the past. Their color suits their environment well, providing them with a natural camouflage from predators as well as prey. Males have a pectinal tooth count of 21–30, while females have 20–27.

== Distribution and habitat ==
The natural geographic distribution of C. vittatus is formed by several adjoining South-Central US states and northern Mexico. Beginning in the northern Mexico Border States, Chihuahua, Coahuila, Nuevo León, and Tamaulipas, C. vittatus’s range extends northward through Texas, Oklahoma, and Kansas, to reach as far north as Thayer County, Nebraska. The area also extends eastward from the Sangre de Cristo Mountains and Rio Grande in New Mexico and south Colorado to the Missouri and Mississippi Rivers in Missouri and Louisiana. In Colorado, the established range extends partially up Colorado Springs, generally halting around the northern area of the city, with annual blacklight hunts in the late summer around the Cheyenne Mountain area. In all, the range includes the following states: Arkansas, Colorado, Kansas, Illinois, Louisiana, Mississippi, Missouri, Nebraska, New Mexico, Oklahoma, Florida, Georgia, and Texas.

Reports have also found C. vittatus in locations inconsistent with the aforementioned natural geographic distribution. Populations seem to be found only in particular cities outside its natural distribution, so it is thought likely that human activity has introduced C. vittatus to these areas. They include locations in Iowa (Harrison County), Kentucky (Marshall and Calloway Counties), Louisiana (East Baton Rouge Parish and Orleans Parish), Mississippi (Lamar, Pike, and Rankin Counties), Missouri (Clark County), North Carolina (Dare, Nash, and Wake Counties), and Tennessee (Rutherford and Shelby Counties). Additional sightings have occurred in Arizona (Maricopa County), California (Contra Costa County), and Colorado (Boulder County).

A wide geographic distribution allows C. vittatus to occupy desert, deciduous and coniferous forest, and temperate grassland [biomes], where they can be found in crevices under rock and surface debris, vegetation, old rural structures like sheds and barns, and houses during the day. At night, this species emerges from its daytime home and can be found on the open ground or in vegetation, like microphyllous desertic brushwood or other classifications.

Centruroides implies this species is a semi-arboreal one, the striped bark scorpion spends a substantial amount of its time on the ground; and can be found under rock and surface debris, within vegetation, and in weathered rural structures such as old sheds and barns during the day. The terrestrial preferences of this species carry into the night hours, when the scorpion emerges from its temporary shelter at or after sunset to forage for potential prey. Juveniles, however, spend a substantial amount of time in vegetation, likely to avoid predation to which they are more vulnerable. C. vittatus has a very dynamic diet which includes insects, smaller arachnids, and juveniles of the same species. It is preyed on by birds, reptiles, some mammals, and larger arachnids.

Unlike most species of scorpion, C. vittatus is social, presenting it with more opportunities to mate and compete for mates. Consequently, the process of reproduction is both intricate and extensive. Males begin by engaging behavior to establish dominance to mate. They engage in a showdown that highlights tail-waving and shifting until one male backs down. Once one male has established he is the one to mate, he engages the female in the first “step” of courtship, called the promenade a deux (PAD). During this step, the smaller male maneuvers the female to a spot where he can deposit the spermatophore, a small capsule containing the male's sperm, for reception. This step determines whether the female will assume the male's spermatophore, as the male must hold the female long enough to coax her over the spermatophore. Larger males tend to have more success at maneuvering the female than smaller ones. If the male has successfully maneuvered her, the male and female move onto join together and rub chelicera in the “kiss” stage, where the female takes up the spermatophore. The female then allows about 8 months for gestation, whereupon she has live offspring which spend the time for at least one molt on the protection of her back.

== Human significance ==
Thousands of people are stung yearly by C. vittatus while barefoot or accidentally making contact with the scorpion in houses and other man-made structures. While a sting from C. vittatus is very rarely deadly, it is painful and causes localized swelling. Neurotoxins in the venom can also cause paresthesia and muscle spasms, while more severe cases have resulted in a more intense hypersensitive reaction, characterized by symptoms such as angioedema, abdominal cramping, chest tightness, flushing, lightheadedness, a large localized reaction, nausea and vomiting, syncope, shortness of breath, urticaria, wheezing, and in the most severe cases, anaphylactic shock. C. vittatus venom contains the toxin CvlV4, which has been shown to target and decrease the inactivation of NA+ channels located in the Dorsal root ganglia of Nociceptors (sensory neurons that detect pain), resulting in a prolonged activation of action potentials. C. vittatus venom is composed of multiple proteins that serve as allergens to the human body. SDS-PAGE and IgE immunoblots reveal that nine of these proteins elicit an IgE-mediated immune response, which is known to be consistent with a hypersensitive reaction. In addition, Api-Zym and radial diffusion assays show that C. vittatus venom contains the enzymes alkaline phosphatase, esterase, esterase lipase, acid phosphatase, and phospholipase A.

While a C. vittatus sting is not typically deadly, and signs such as swelling can be treated using an ice pack, several other species from the genus Centruroides can have a deadly sting and medical attention should be sought immediately.

== See also ==
- Arizona bark scorpion
