= Centruroides fulvipes =

Scientific classification
- Domain: Eukaryota
- Kingdom: Animalia
- Phylum: Arthropoda
- Subphylum: Chelicerata
- Class: Arachnida
- Order: Scorpiones
- Family: Buthidae
- Genus: Centruroides
- Species: C. fulvipes

Binomial name
- Centruroides fulvipes Pocock, 1898

Species of scorpion

Centruroides fulvipes is a species of scorpion in the family Buthidae. It is native to Mexico.
