= Centruroides jaragua =

Scientific classification
- Domain: Eukaryota
- Kingdom: Animalia
- Phylum: Arthropoda
- Subphylum: Chelicerata
- Class: Arachnida
- Order: Scorpiones
- Family: Buthidae
- Genus: Centruroides
- Species: C. jaragua

Binomial name
- Centruroides jaragua Armas, 1999

Species of scorpion

Centruroides jaragua is a species of scorpion in the family Buthidae. It is native to the Dominican Republic.

== Distribution and habitat ==
C. jaragua is known from Pedernales Province in the Dominican Republic, including Beata Island, with much of its range falling within the boundaries of Jaragua National Park. On Beata Island, juveniles were collected in semi-xerophytic forest on calcareous rock.

== Description ==
C. jaragua is a medium sized scorpion, measuring 35–50 mm (1.4–2.0 in) long, and mostly yellow in colour with brown markings.
