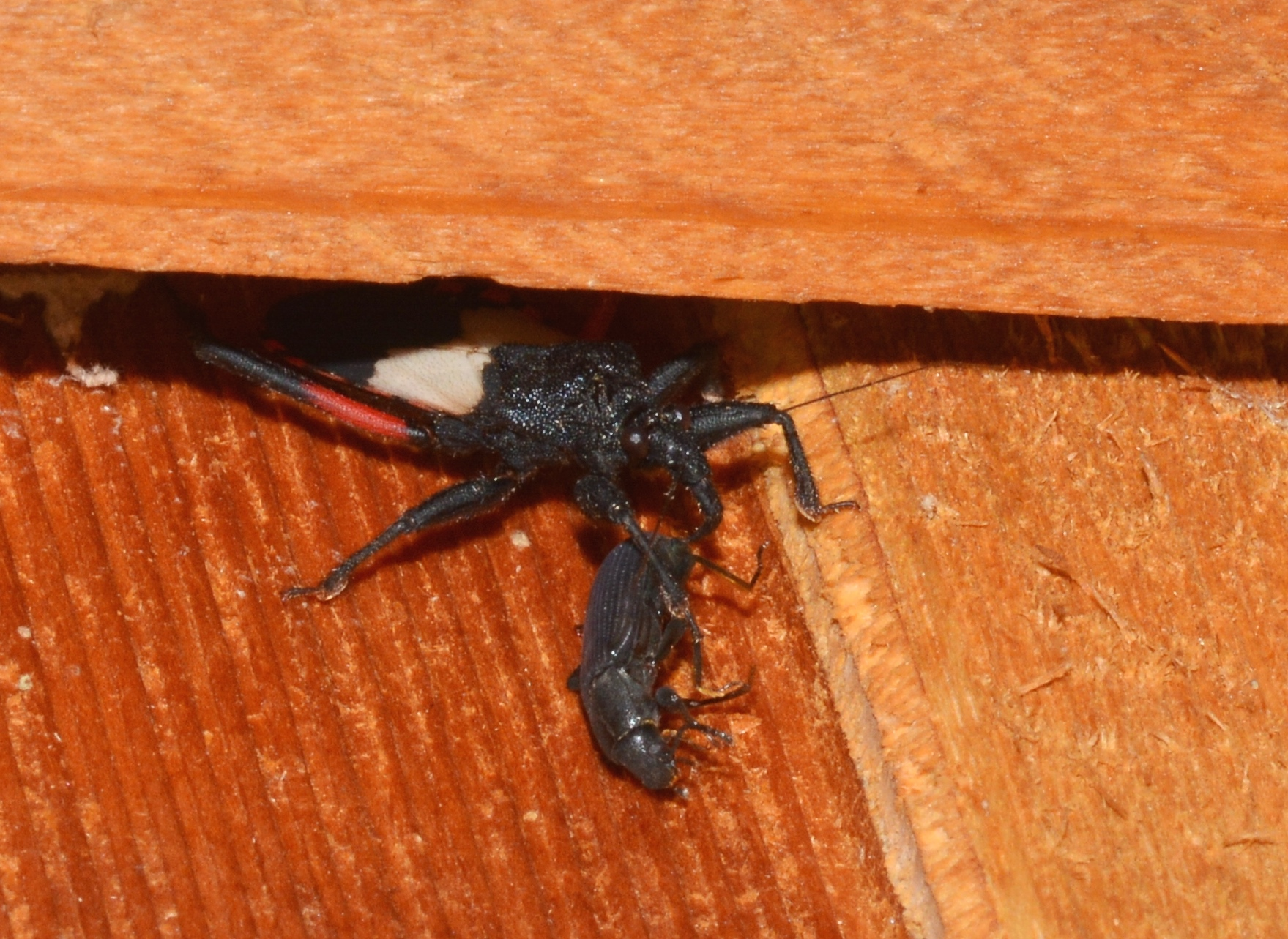
- Microtomus purcis

Scientific classification
- Kingdom: Animalia
- Phylum: Arthropoda
- Clade: Pancrustacea
- Class: Insecta
- Order: Hemiptera
- Suborder: Heteroptera
- Family: Reduviidae
- Subfamily: Microtominae
- Genus: Microtomus; Illiger, 1807

= Microtomus =

Genus of true bugs

Microtomus is a genus of assassin bugs in the family Reduviidae. There are about 10 described species in Microtomus.

== Species ==
These 10 species belong to the genus Microtomus:

- Microtomus conspicillaris (Drury, 1782)
- Microtomus gayi (Spinola, 1852)
- Microtomus kuntzeni Stichel, 1926
- Microtomus luctuosus (Stål, 1854)
- Microtomus lunifer (Berg, 1900)
- Microtomus maculatus Stichel, 1926
- Microtomus pessoai Lent & Suárez, 1956
- Microtomus pintoi Lima, 1935
- Microtomus purcis (Drury, 1782)
- Microtomus tibialis Stichel, 1926
