= Centruroides elegans =

Scientific classification
- Domain: Eukaryota
- Kingdom: Animalia
- Phylum: Arthropoda
- Subphylum: Chelicerata
- Class: Arachnida
- Order: Scorpiones
- Family: Buthidae
- Genus: Centruroides
- Species: C. elegans

Binomial name
- Centruroides elegans (Thorell, 1876)

Subspecies
- Centruroides elegans edentulus Werner, 1940; Centruroides elegans elegans; Centruroides elegans guanensis Franganillo, 1932; Centruroides elegans insularis Pocock, 1903; Centruroides elegans limpidus; Centruroides elegans meisei Hoffmann, 1933

Synonyms
- Centrurus elegans Thorell, 1876

Species of scorpion

Centruroides elegans is a scorpion species in the genus Centruroides found in Mexico.
