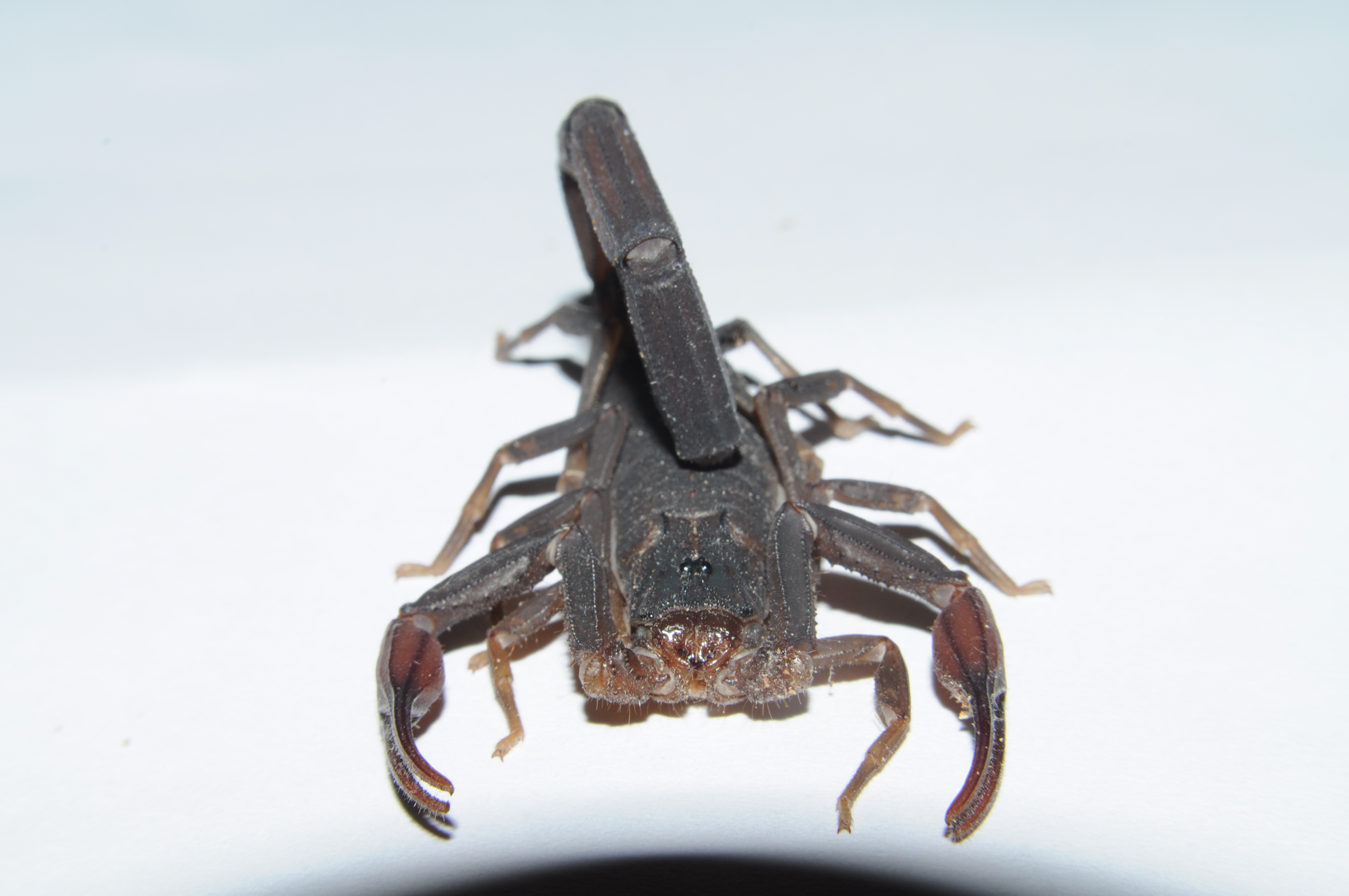

Scientific classification
- Kingdom: Animalia
- Phylum: Arthropoda
- Subphylum: Chelicerata
- Class: Arachnida
- Order: Scorpiones
- Family: Buthidae
- Genus: Centruroides
- Species: C. gracilis

Binomial name
- Centruroides gracilis (Latreille, 1804)

= Centruroides gracilis =

Species of scorpion

Centruroides gracilis is a species of scorpion in the family Buthidae, the bark scorpions. Its common names include Florida bark scorpion, brown bark scorpion, red bark scorpion, slender brown scorpion, and slender red scorpion. In Cuba it is known as alacran prieto ("dusky scorpion") and alacran azul ("blue scorpion"). Contrary to one of its common names, it is not actually native to Florida in the United States. It is native to northern parts of the middle Americas, including Mexico, Guatemala, Belize, and Honduras. It is present in other parts as an introduced species, including Cuba, Panama, Colombia, Ecuador, Jamaica, and Florida in the United States. It is also introduced in parts of Africa, including Cameroon and Gabon, as well as the island of Tenerife (Canary Islands.)

In Florida, it is sympatric with two native Centruroides species, the Hentz striped scorpion (C. hentzi) and the Guiana striped scorpion (C. guianensis). This species is sometimes kept as a pet.

== Description ==
The female of the species reaches up to 10 centimeters in length, while the male can exceed 15 centimeters. It is variable in color, sometimes with individuals of different colors occurring in one population, or even one litter. It may be reddish, black with reddish chelae, dark brown with yellowish legs and red chelae, or dark brown with reddish and black tail sections.

== Life cycle ==
The female gives birth to a litter of 25 to 35 young, with litters of 91 recorded. The juveniles ride on the female's back and undergo their first molt at eight days of age. A study of captive scorpions revealed the length of their life cycle. The juveniles progress through instar stages, sometimes dying of complications with the molting process. The female reaches maturity in roughly 300 days, after seven instars, but the males mature at different rates. Some reach sexual maturity in the sixth instar, at about 235 days of age, while some are not mature until the seventh instar, around 281 days old. At mating, the male engages in courtship behavior and produces a spermatophore. Females can reproduce via parthenogenesis, as well. In the laboratory the males had an average life span of about 33 months, while the females lived about 38 months.

== Diet ==
This scorpion feeds on insects such as roaches. Captive scorpions can be fed termites or crickets.

== Habitat ==
The scorpion lives under rocks and tree bark. When given the opportunity it will live in the walls of houses and under rubbish piles in yards.

== Predators ==
Predators of the scorpion include tarantulas, such as Tliltocatl vagans. The tarantula may kill the scorpion, even if the scorpion attacks first.

== Venom ==
The scorpion is venomous, but much less toxic than others of its genus. Its venom is neurotoxic and cardiotoxic, causing the release of catecholamines. Local effects from the sting can include pain, redness, itching, and swelling. The venom can produce cardiac effects such as arrhythmia, pulmonary edema, tachycardia or bradycardia, and hyper- or hypotension. Other possible symptoms include nausea, vomiting, sweating, diarrhea, shock, convulsions, coma, and potentially death.
