= Margatoxin =

Scorpion short toxin
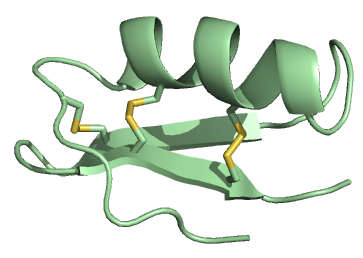
- Margatoxin. Disulphide bonds are highlighted. PDB 1mtx

Identifiers
- Symbol: Toxin_2
- Pfam: PF00451
- Pfam clan: CL0054
- InterPro: IPR001947
- PROSITE: PDOC00875
Available protein structures:
- PDB: IPR001947 PF00451 (ECOD; PDBsum)
- AlphaFold: IPR001947; PF00451

Margatoxin (MgTX) is a peptide that selectively inhibits Kv1.3 voltage-dependent potassium channels. It is found in the venom of Centruroides margaritatus, also known as the Central American Bark Scorpion. Margatoxin was first discovered in 1993. It was purified from scorpion venom and its amino acid sequence was determined.

== Structure ==
Margatoxin is a peptide of 39 amino acids with a molecular weight of 4185 Dalton. The primary amino acid sequence of margatoxin is as follows:

Thr-Ile-Ile-Asn-Val-Lys-Cys-Thr-Ser-Pro-Lys-Gln-Cys-Leu-Pro-Pro-Cys-Lys-Ala-Gln-Phe-Gly-Gln-Ser-Ala-Gly-Ala-Lys-Cys-Met-Asn-Gly-Lys-Cys-Lys-Cys-Tyr-Pro-His

Or, when translated to one-letter sequence,

TIINVKCTSPKQCLPPCKAQFGQSAGAKCMNGKCKCYPH.

There are disulfide bridges between Cys7-Cys29, Cys13-Cys34 and Cys17-Cys36.
Margatoxin is classified as a "scorpion short toxin" by Pfam, showing sequence homology with other potassium channel blockers, such as charybdotoxin (44%), kaliotoxin (54%), iberiotoxin (41%) and noxiustoxin (79%), which are also derived from scorpion venom.

== Synthesis ==
Margatoxin is a peptide originally purified from the venom of the scorpion Centrutoides margaritatus (Central American Bark Scorpion). Scorpion toxins are specific and have a high affinity for their targets, and this makes them good tools to characterize various receptor proteins involved in ion channel functioning. Because only low amounts of natural toxins can be isolated from scorpion venoms, a chemical synthesis approach has been utilised to produce sufficient protein for research. This approach is not only produces enough material to study the effects on potassium channels but ensures purity as toxin isolated from the scorpion venom risks contamination by other active compounds.

Margatoxin can be chemically synthesized using the solid phase synthesis technique. The compound gained by this technique was compared with the natural, purified margatoxin. Both compounds had the same physical and biological properties. The chemically synthesized margatoxin is now used to study the role of Kv1.3 channels.

== Mechanism of action ==
Margatoxin blocks potassium channels Kv1.1 Kv1.2 en Kv1.3. Kv1.2 channel regulates neurotransmitter release associated with heart rate, insulin secretion, neuronal excitability, epithelial electrolyte transport, smooth muscle contraction, immunological response and cell volume. Kv1.3 channels are expressed in T and B lymphocytes. Margatoxin irreversibly inhibits the proliferation of human T-cells in a concentration of 20 μM. At lower concentrations, this inhibition is reversible.

=== Influence on cardiovascular function ===
Margatoxin significantly reduces outward currents of Kv1.3 channels and depolarized resting membrane potential. It increases the time necessary to conduct action potentials in the cell in response to a stimulus. Acetylcholine (ACh) plays a key role in activation of nicotinic and muscarinic ACh-receptors. Margatoxin influences nicotinic ACh-receptor agonist-induced norepinephrine release. Upon activation of muscarinic ACh receptors with bethanechol, margatoxin-sensitive current was suppressed. Therefore, it was concluded that Kv1.3 affects the function of postganglionic sympathetic neurons, so one could suggest that Kv1.3 influences sympathetic control of cardiovascular function.

=== Immune system suppression ===
Kv1.3-channels can be found in various cells, including T-lymphocytes and macrophages. To activate an immune response a T-lymphocyte has to come into contact with a macrophage. The macrophage can then produce cytokines, such as IL-1, IL-6, and TNF-α. Cytokines are cell signaling molecules that can enhance the immune response. Kv1.3-channels are important for the activation of T-lymphocytes, and thus for the activation of macrophages. The disturbance of the function of Kv1.3-channels, for example due to inhibition of these channels, will lower the cytokines production and lymphocyte proliferation in vitro. This would lead to immune response suppression in vivo.

Kv channels are regulated during proliferation and regulation of macrophages and their activity is important during cell responses. In contrast to leukocytes which have monomeric Kv1.3 channels, macrophages have heterotetrameric Kv1.3/Kv1.5 channels. These heterotetramers plays a role in regulating the membrane potential of macrophages on different stages of macrophage activation by lymphocytes. Potassium channels are involved in leukocyte activation by calcium. The possible different conformations of these Kv1.3 and 1.5 complexes can affect the immune response. Margatoxin inhibits Kv1.3 channels, so no heterodimers can be formed. The effect of margatoxin is similar to the effect of DEX. DEX diminishes amount of K1.3 channels by binding to GC receptor, which leads to downregulating of expression of K1.3 channels. Both margatoxin and DEX lead to immune suppression.

=== Effects on ion channels in lymphocytes ===
Ion channels play a key role in lymphocyte signal transduction. Potassium channels are required for the activation of T-cells. Pharmacological inhibition of potassium channels can be useful in the treatment of immune diseases. The membrane potential exerts powerful effects on the lymphocyte activation. The resting potential results primarily from a potassium-diffusion potential contributed by potassium channels. Margatoxin depolarizes resting human T cells. Pharmacological studies suggest that functional potassium channels are required in the activation of T- and B-cells. KV channel blockers inhibit activation, gene expression, killing by cytotoxic T cells and NK cells, lymphokine secretion and proliferation. Margatoxin blocks mitogen-induced proliferation, the mixed lymphocyte response and the secretion of Interleukin-2 and interferon-gamma (IFN-γ). This provides the strongest available evidence for a role of KV channels in mitogenesis.

== Toxicity ==
Margatoxin can have several different effects on the body:

- May cause skin irritation
- May be harmful if absorbed through the skin
- May cause eye irritation
- May be harmful if inhaled
- Material may be irritating to mucous membranes and upper respiratory tract
- May be harmful if swallowed
- Prolonged or repeated exposure may cause allergic reactions in certain sensitive individuals
- May be fatal if enters bloodstream

The chronic effects target the heart, nerves, lungs, skeleton and muscles.

The median lethal dose (LD50) of margatoxin is 59.9 mg/kg, so Centruroides margaritatus stings are not dangerous to humans except as a result of possible anaphylactic responses. They do cause pain, local swelling, and tingling for 3–4 hours, but no intervention beyond symptomatic relief should be necessary.

== Effects on animals ==
Margatoxin leads to the depolarization of human and pig cells in vitro. By blocking 99% of the KV1.3-channels, margatoxin inhibits the proliferation response of T-cells in mini-swine. Furthermore, it suppresses a B-cell response to allogenic immunization and inhibits the delayed-type hypersensitivity reaction to tuberculin. In pigs, the protein's half-life is two hours. When the peptide is continuously infused, it leads to diarrhea and hypersalivation. However, no major toxic effects are observed in animals. In contrast to when the plasma concentration of margatoxin is higher than 10nM, the transient hyperactivity occurs in pigs. It might be an effect of Kv1.1 and Kv1.2 channels in the brain.

== Efficacy and side effects ==
Kv1.3 is already linked with proliferation of lymphocytes, vascular smooth cells, oligodendrocytes and cancer cells. Recent studies have shown that there is therapeutical potential for Kv1.3-blockers such as Margatoxin.

In a minipig treatment a study with margatoxin has been conducted. An eight-day treatment led to a prolonged immune suppression that lasted three to four weeks after termination of dosing. Thymic atrophy (reduced thymus) was observed. Especially the cells in the cortical region had decreased in number

== Medicinal significance ==
Neointimal Hyperplasia is the movement and proliferation of smooth muscle cells into the luminal area of a blood vessel. This generates a new inner structure that can block blood flow. This is commonly seen to cause failure of interventional clinical procedures that include placement of stents and bypass grafts.

Due to changes in potassium channel type the vascular smooth muscle cells switch from the contractile to proliferating phenotype. It is suggested that Kv1.3 is important in proliferating vascular smooth muscle cells. Inhibitors of such channels suppress vascular smooth muscle proliferation, stenosis following injury, and neointimal hyperplasia. Studies shows that margatoxin is a high potency inhibitor of vascular cell migration, with an IC50 (half maximal inhibitory concentration) of 85 pM. In this study, a negative effect was also found. There have been vasoconstrictor effects observed in some arteries, but elevated blood pressure has not appeared as a significant concern.
