= Cll1 =

Scorpion protein

Toxin Cll1 is a toxin from the venom of the Mexican scorpion Centruroides limpidus limpidus, which changes the activation threshold of sodium channels by binding to neurotoxin binding site 4, resulting in increased excitability.

Chemical structure of Cll1

== Etymology and source ==
The toxin Cll1 is named after its producing species, Centruroides limpidus limpidus. Along with Cll1, multiple toxins are excreted in its venom.

== Chemistry ==
Cll1 is a long chain neuropeptide belonging to the scorpion toxin superfamily. Cll1 is classified as a member of the beta-toxin subfamily. The global secondary structure of Cll1 is similar to that of other scorpion beta-toxins, including the alpha-helix, triple stranded antiparallel beta-sheet, and the four disulfide bridges. The higher affinity for crustacean rather than mammalian sodium channels has been attributed to the presence of Trp18, a hydrophobic amino acid at the surface of Cll1.

== Target ==
Cll1 targets, like the classical scorpion beta-toxin, the voltage-gated sodium channels (Na_{v}). Beta-toxins bind to the extracellular end of the voltage sensor S4 at the loop between the 3rd and 4th segment of the second domain. By binding it alters the voltage dependent opening of the channel.

== Mode of action ==
Cll1 influences three intrinsic properties of the targeted sodium channel:

=== Voltage dependent activation ===
Cll1 binds to transmembrane segment S4 of the voltage gated sodium channels. Its binding shifts the activation threshold of the sodium channel towards more negative membrane potentials. Seven different isoforms of the voltage gated sodium channels (Na_{v}1.1-Na_{v}1.7) have been studied in the presence of Cll1. In almost all of these seven isoforms, Cll1 affects voltage dependent activation. It has only a minor effect on the Na_{v}1.1-1.4 and Na_{v}1.7 channels, but a much larger effect on isoform Na_{v}1.6.

=== Peak current ===
Cll1 causes a reduction of the peak current when bound to the voltage activated sodium channels. This effect was present in all but one of the seven tested isoforms (Na_{v}1.1-Na_{v}1.6). The only isoform that showed no reduction in peak current was Na_{v}1.7.

=== Resurgent current ===
Cll1 can induce resurgent currents. This effect has also been demonstrated for other beta-scorpion toxins. The resurgent current is strongest in Na_{v}1.6, but it is also present to a much lesser extent in other isoforms of the voltage activated sodium channels.

== Toxicity and treatment ==
The LD_{50} of the Cll1 toxin in mice is 85 μg/kg. A possible treatment for an intoxication by Cll1 toxin is the use of single chain variable fragments (scFv). Other possible treatments find their origin in traditional Mexican medicine. Several herbs used in traditional Mexican medicine have been proven to be effective in treating an intoxication from the whole venom from C. limpidus limpidus in mice, including Bouvardia ternifolia.
