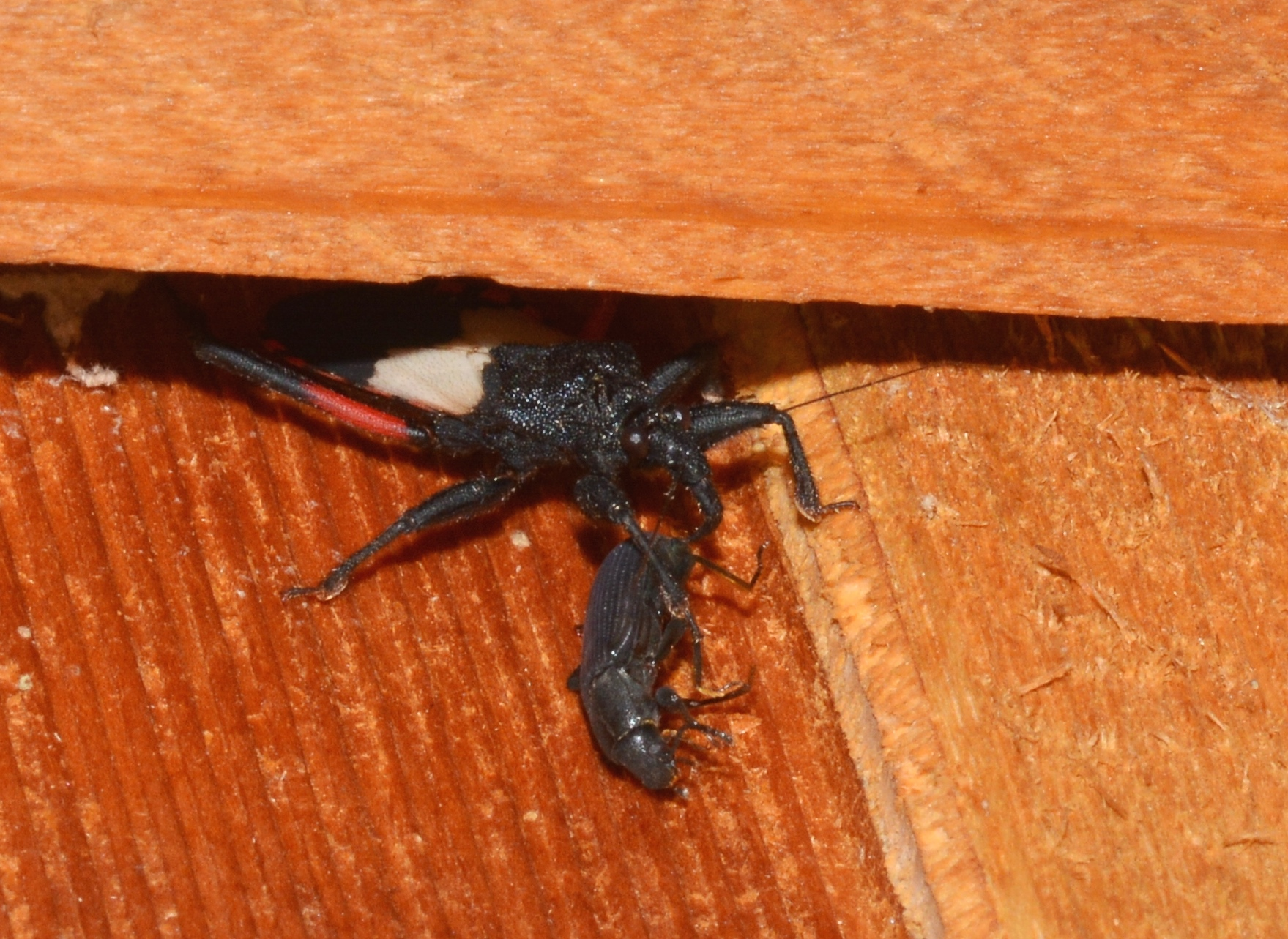

Scientific classification
- Kingdom: Animalia
- Phylum: Arthropoda
- Class: Insecta
- Order: Hemiptera
- Suborder: Heteroptera
- Family: Reduviidae
- Genus: Microtomus
- Species: M. purcis

Binomial name
- Microtomus purcis (Drury, 1782)

Synonyms
- Cimex purcis Drury, 1782

= Microtomus purcis =

Species of true bug

Microtomus purcis is a species of assassin bug in the family Reduviidae. It is found in North America.
