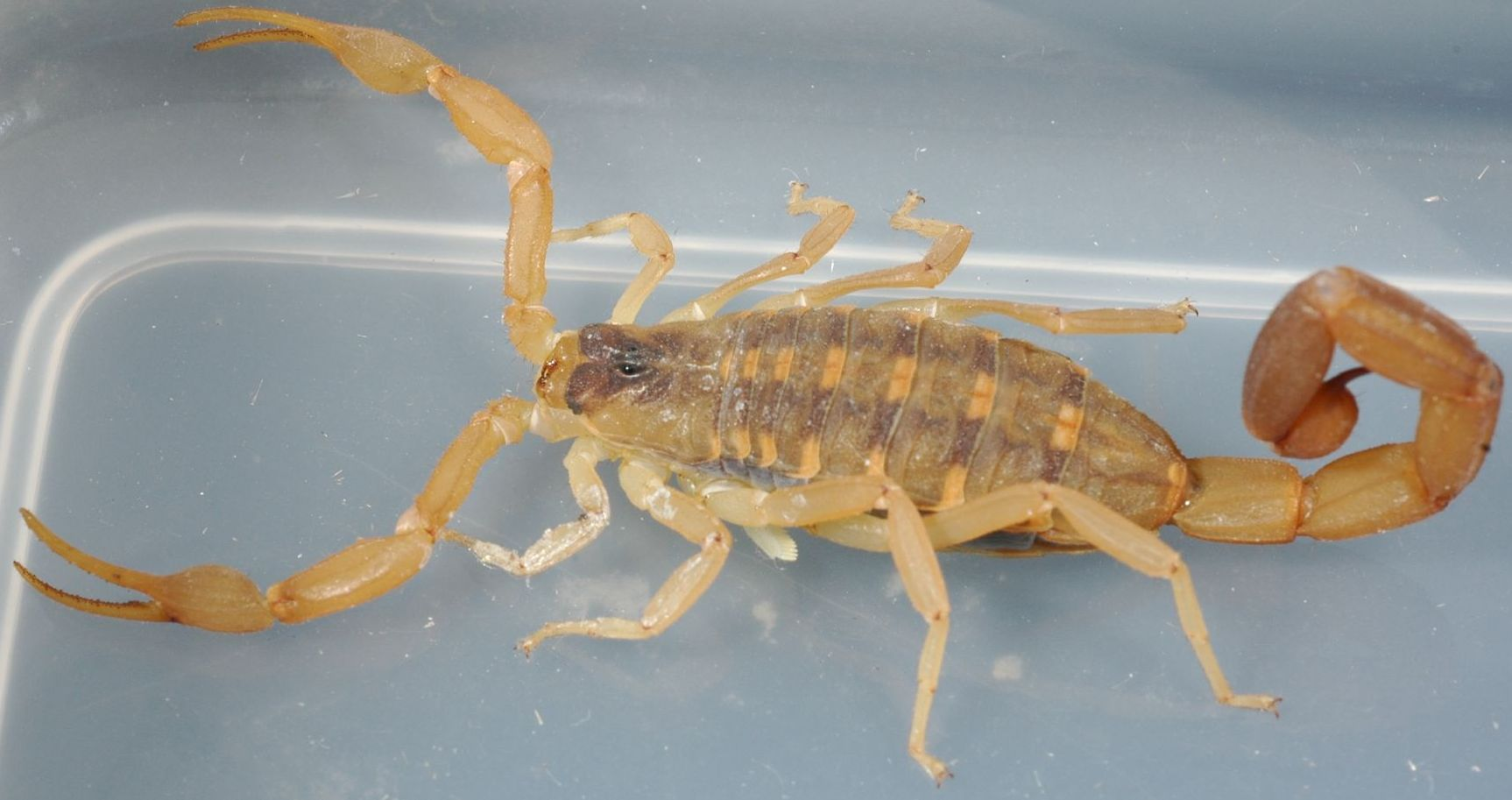
- Striped bark scorpion (Centruroides vittatus)

Scientific classification
- Kingdom: Animalia
- Phylum: Arthropoda
- Subphylum: Chelicerata
- Class: Arachnida
- Order: Scorpiones
- Family: Buthidae
- Genus: Centruroides; Marx, 1890

Diversity
- About 100 species

= Centruroides =

Centruroides Temporal range: Neogene–present

Genus of scorpions

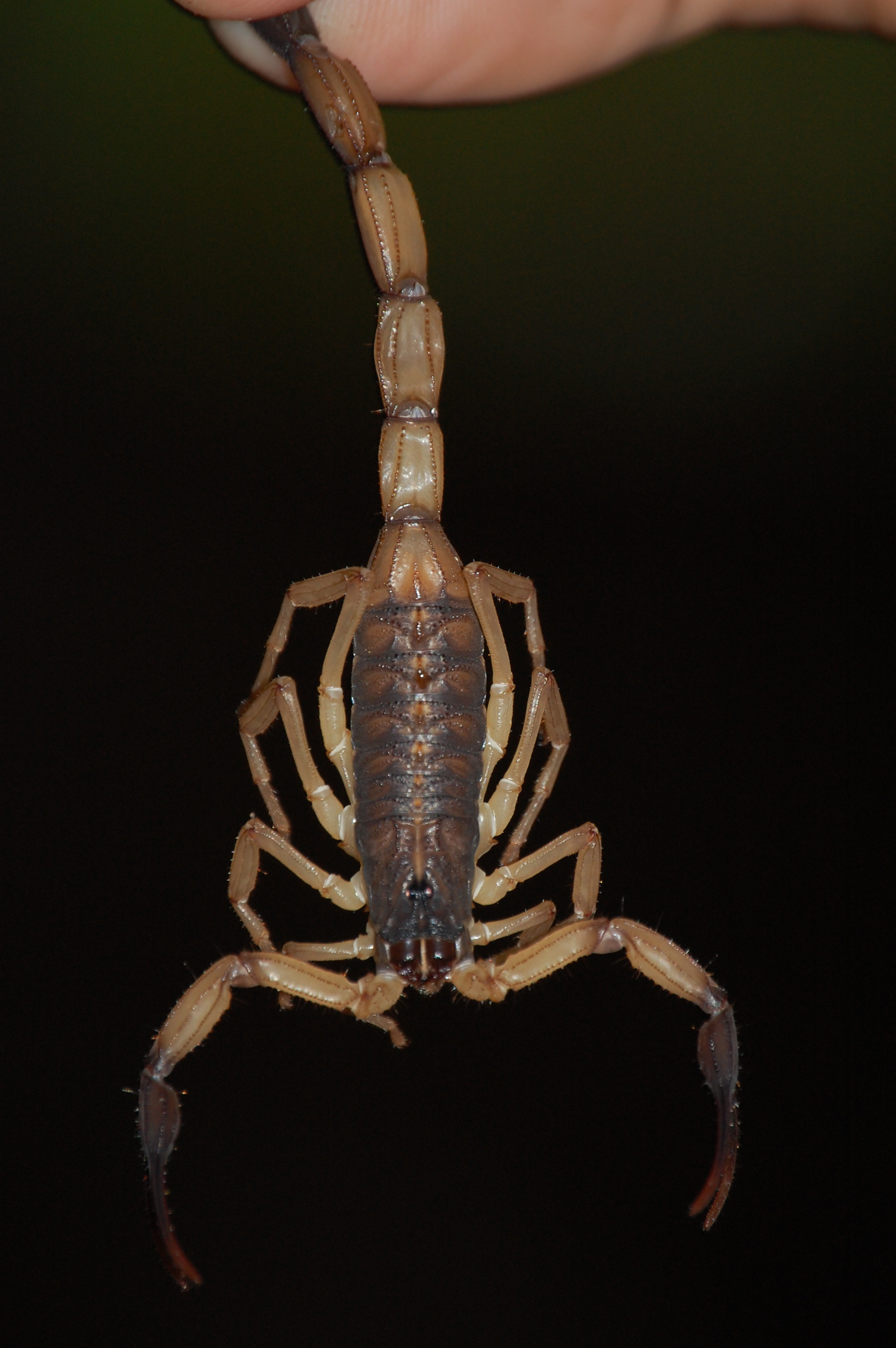
Centruroides limbatus from the Osa Peninsula, Costa Rica

Centruroides is a genus of scorpions of the family Buthidae. Several North American species are known by the common vernacular name bark scorpion. Numerous species are extensively found throughout the southern United States, Mexico, Central America, the Antilles and northern South America. Some are known for their interesting patterning or large size (among Buthidae); most if not all fluoresce strongly under ultraviolet illumination, except after moulting. They contain several highly venomous species, and fatalities are known to occur. The venom of the Mexican scorpion Centruroides limpidus limpidus contains the neurotoxins Cll1 and Cll2.

== Taxonomy ==
The number of species accepted as valid may vary, depending on the authority. The genus is highly speciose, containing at least 100 species:

- Centruroides alayoni Armas, 1999
- Centruroides altagraciae Teruel, de Armas & Kovarik, 2015
- Centruroides anchorellus Armas, 1976
- Centruroides arctimanus Armas, 1976
- Centruroides baergi Hoffmann, 1932
- Centruroides balsasensis Ponce & Francke, 2004
- Centruroides bani Armas & Marcano Fondeur, 1987
- Centruroides baracoae Armas, 1976
- Centruroides barbudensis (Pocock, 1898)
- Centruroides berstoni Goodman, Prendini, Francke & Esposito, 2021
- Centruroides bertholdii (Thorell, 1876)
- Centruroides bicolor (Pocock, 1898)
- Centruroides bonito Quijano-Ravell, Teruel & Ponce-Saavedra, 2016
- Centruroides caral Armas & Trujillo, 2013
- Centruroides caribbeanus Teruel & Myers, 2017
- Centruroides chamela Ponce-Saavedra & Francke, 2011
- Centruroides chamulaensis Hoffmann, 1932
- Centruroides catemacoensis Goodman, Prendini, Francke & Esposito, 2021
- Centruroides chanae Goodman, Prendini, Francke & Esposito, 2021
- Centruroides chiapanensis Hoffmann, 1932
- Centruroides concordia Armas & Teruel, 2021
- Centruroides cuauhmapan Goodman, Prendini, Francke & Esposito, 2021
- Centruroides edwardsii (Gervais, 1843)
- Centruroides elegans (Thorell, 1876)
- Centruroides exilicauda (Wood, 1863)
- Centruroides exilimanus Teruel & Stockwell, 2002
- Centruroides exsul (Meise, 1933)
- Centruroides fallassisimus Armas & Trujillo, 2010
- Centruroides farri Armas, 1976
- Centruroides flavopictus (Pocock, 1898)
- Centruroides franckei Santibanez-Lopez & Contreras-Felix, 2013
- Centruroides fulvipes (Pocock, 1898)
- Centruroides galano Teruel, 2001
- Centruroides gracilis (Latreille, 1804)
- Centruroides granosus (Thorell, 1876)
- Centruroides griseus (C. L. Koch, 1844)
- Centruroides guanensis Franganillo, 1930
- Centruroides hamadryas Goodman, Prendini, Francke & Esposito, 2021
- Centruroides hentzi (Banks, 1900)
- Centruroides hirsuticauda Teruel, 2011
- Centruroides hirsutipalpus Ponce-Saavedra & Francke, 2009
- Centruroides hoffmanni Armas, 1996
- Centruroides huichol Teruel, Ponce-Saavedra & Quijano-Ravell, 2015
- Centruroides infamatus (C. L. Koch, 1844)
- Centruroides insulanus (Thorell, 1876)
- Centruroides ixil Trujillo & Armas, 2016
- Centruroides jaragua Armas, 1999
- Centruroides jorgeorum Santiago-Blay, 2009
- Centruroides koesteri Kraepelin, 1912
- Centruroides lauriadnae Ponce-Saavedra & Francke, 2019
- Centruroides limbatus (Pocock, 1898)
- Centruroides limpidus (Karsch, 1879)
- Centruroides luceorum Armas, 1999
- Centruroides lucidus Teruel, Armas & Kovarik, 2015
- Centruroides marcanoi Armas, 1981
- Centruroides margaritatus (Gervais, 1841)
- Centruroides mascota Ponce-Saavedra & Francke, 2011
- Centruroides meisei Hoffmann, 1939
- Centruroides melanodactylus Teruel, 2001
- Centruroides navarroi Teruel, 2001
- Centruroides nigrescens (Pocock, 1898)
- Centruroides nigrimanus (Pocock, 1898)
- Centruroides nigropunctatus Teruel, 2006
- Centruroides nigrovariatus (Pocock, 1898)
- Centruroides nitidus (Thorell, 1876)
- Centruroides noxius Hoffmann, 1932
- Centruroides ochraceus (Pocock, 1898)
- Centruroides orizaba Armas & Martin-Frias, 2003
- Centruroides ornatus Pocock, 1902
- Centruroides pallidiceps Pocock, 1902
- Centruroides panamensis Arias & Esposito, 2014
- Centruroides platnicki Armas, 1981
- Centruroides pococki Sissom & Francke, 1983
- Centruroides polito Teruel, 2007
- Centruroides poncei Teruel, Kovarik, Baldazo-Monsivais & Hoferek, 2015
- Centruroides possanii Gonzalez-Santillan, Galan-Sanchez & Valdez-Velazquez, 2019
- Centruroides rileyi Sissom, 1995
- Centruroides robertoi Armas, 1976
- Centruroides rodolfoi Santibanez-Lopez & Contreras-Felix, 2013
- "Centruroides rommeli" Ponce-Saavedra, Linares-Guillen, Quijano-Ravell & Chassin-Noria, 2025
- Centruroides romeroi Quijano-Ravell, De Armas, Francke & Ponce-Saavedra, 2019
- Centruroides ruana Quijano-Ravell & Ponce-Saavedra, 2016
- Centruroides sanandres Armas, Sarmiento & Florez, 2012
- Centruroides sasae Santiago-Blay, 2009
- Centruroides schmidti Sissom, 1995
- Centruroides sculpturatus Ewing, 1928
- Centruroides serrano Santibanez-Lopez & Ponce-Saavedra, 2009
- Centruroides simplex (Thorell, 1876)
- Centruroides sissomi Armas, 1996
- Centruroides spectatus Teruel, 2006
- Centruroides stockwelli Teruel, 2001
- Centruroides suffusus (Pocock, 1902)
- Centruroides tapachulaensis Hoffmann, 1932
- Centruroides tecomanus Hoffmann, 1932
- Centruroides tenuis Thorell, 1876
- Centruroides testaceus (DeGeer, 1778)
- Centruroides thorellii (Kraepelin, 1891)
- Centruroides tuxtla Armas, 1999
- Centruroides underwoodi Armas, 1976
- Centruroides villegasi Baldazo-Monsivaiz, Ponce-Saavedra & Flores-Moreno, 2013
- Centruroides vittatus (Say, 1821)
- Centruroides yucatanensis Goodman, Prendini, Francke & Esposito, 2021
