= Arma people =

Moroccan-descended ethnic group of Mali

Arma
Total population
- c. 20,000 (1986, last report)

Regions with significant populations
- Middle Niger River Valley (Mali and Niger)

Languages
- Songhay languages, French

Religion
- Sunni Islam

Related ethnic groups
- Songhai, Mandé, Moroccan

The Arma people are an ethnic group of the middle Niger River valley, descended from Moroccan invaders of the 16th century. The name, applied by other groups, derives from the word ar-rumah (Arabic: الرماة) 'fusiliers'.

The Arma ethnicity is distinct from (but sometimes confused with) the 3.6 million Zarma people of western Niger, who predate the Moroccan invasion and speak the Zarma language, also a member of the Songhay languages.

As of 1986, there were some 20,000 self-identified Arma in Mali, mostly around Timbuktu, the middle Niger bend and the Inner Niger Delta.

== Songhai expedition ==
The 1590 expedition sent to conquer the Songhai Empire trade routes by the Saadi dynasty of Morocco was made up of four thousand Moroccan, Morisco refugees and European renegades. They were armed with European-style arquebuses. After the destruction of the Songhai Empire in 1591, the Moroccans settled into Djenné, Gao, Timbuktu and the larger towns of the Niger River bend. Never able to exert control outside their large fortifications, within a decade the expedition's leaders were abandoned by Morocco. In cities like Timbuktu, the men of the 1591 expedition intermarried with the Songhai, became small scale independent rulers, and some of their descendants came to be identified as minor dynasties of their own right. By the end of the 17th century, Bambara, Tuareg, Fula, and other forces came to control empires and city-states in the region, leaving the Arma as a mere ethnicity.

== See also ==
- Judar Pasha – commander of the Moroccan military expedition of the 1590s
- Battle of Tondibi – culmination of the Moroccan expedition, destroying the Songhai Empire in 1591
- Pashalik of Timbuktu – territory governed by the Arma on behalf of Morocco
