= Voltage-gated sodium channel =

Family of transport proteins

Voltage-gated sodium channels (VGSCs), also known as voltage-dependent sodium channels (VDSCs), are a group of voltage-gated ion channels found in the membrane of excitable cells (e.g., muscle, glial cells, neurons, etc.) with a permeability to the sodium ion Na^{+}. They are the main channels involved in action potential of excitable cells.

== Structure ==
Diagram of a voltage-sensitive sodium channel α-subunit. G – glycosylation, P – phosphorylation, S – ion selectivity, I – inactivation. Positive (+) charges in S4 are important for transmembrane voltage sensing.

Sodium channels consist of large alpha subunits that associate with accessory proteins, such as beta subunits. An alpha subunit forms the core of the channel and is functional on its own. When the alpha subunit protein is expressed by a cell, it is able to form a pore in the cell membrane that conducts Na^{+} in a voltage-dependent way, even if beta subunits or other known modulating proteins are not expressed. When accessory proteins assemble with α subunits, the resulting complex can display altered voltage dependence and cellular localization.

The alpha subunit consists of four repeat domains, labelled I through IV, each containing six membrane-spanning segments, labelled S1 through S6. The highly conserved S4 segment acts as the channel's voltage sensor. The voltage sensitivity of this channel is due to positive amino acids located at every third position. When stimulated by a change in transmembrane voltage, this segment moves toward the extracellular side of the cell membrane, allowing the channel to become permeable to ions. The ions are conducted through the central pore cavity, which consists of two main regions. The more external (i.e., more extracellular) portion of the pore is formed by the "P-loops" (the region between S5 and S6) of the four domains. This region is the most narrow part of the pore and is responsible for its ion selectivity. The inner portion (i.e., more cytoplasmic) of the pore is the pore gate and is formed by the combined S5 and S6 segments of the four domains. The pore domain also features lateral tunnels or fenestrations that run perpendicular to the pore axis. These fenestrations that connect the central cavity to the membrane are proposed to be important for drug accessibility.

In mammalian sodium channels, the region linking domains III and IV is also important for channel function. This DIII-IV linker is responsible for wedging the pore gate shut after channel opening, inactivating it.

High-resolution cryo-electron microscopy (cryo-EM) structures of several Eukaryotic voltage gated sodium channels are available and provides valuable insights into the molecular mechanisms of ion channel function and in some cases modulation by toxins.

=== Gating ===
Voltage-gated Na^{+} channels have three main conformational states: closed, open and inactivated. Forward/back transitions between these states are correspondingly referred to as activation/deactivation (between open and closed, respectively), inactivation/reactivation (between inactivated and open, respectively), and recovery from inactivation/closed-state inactivation (between inactivated and closed, respectively). Closed and inactivated states are ion impermeable.

Before an action potential occurs, the axonal membrane is at its normal resting potential, about −70 mV in most human neurons, and Na^{+} channels are in their deactivated state, blocked on the extracellular side by their activation gates. In response to an increase of the membrane potential to about −55 mV (in this case, caused by an action potential), the activation gates open, allowing positively charged Na^{+} ions to flow into the neuron through the channels, and causing the voltage across the neuronal membrane to increase to +30 mV in human neurons. Because the voltage across the membrane is initially negative, as its voltage increases to and past zero (from −70 mV at rest to a maximum of +30 mV), it is said to depolarize. This increase in voltage constitutes the rising phase of an action potential.

Action Potential	Membrane Potential	Target Potential	Gate's Target State	Neuron's Target State
Resting	−70 mV	−55 mV	Deactivated → Activated	Polarized
Rising	−55 mV	0 mV	Activated	Polarized → Depolarized
Rising	0 mV	+30 mV	Activated → Inactivated	Depolarized
Falling	+30 mV	0 mV	Inactivated	Depolarized → Repolarized
Falling	0 mV	−70 mV	Inactivated	Repolarized
Undershot	−70 mV	−75 mV	Inactivated → Deactivated	Repolarized → Hyperpolarized
Rebounding	−75 mV	−70 mV	Deactivated	Hyperpolarized → Polarized

At the peak of the action potential, when enough Na^{+} has entered the neuron and the membrane's potential has become high enough, the Na^{+} channels inactivate themselves by closing their inactivation gates. The inactivation gate can be thought of as a "plug" tethered to domains III and IV of the channel's intracellular alpha subunit. Closure of the inactivation gate causes Na^{+} flow through the channel to stop, which in turn causes the membrane potential to stop rising. The closing of the inactivation gate creates a refractory period within each individual Na^{+} channel. This refractory period eliminates the possibility of an action potential moving in the opposite direction back towards the soma. With its inactivation gate closed, the channel is said to be inactivated. With the Na^{+} channel no longer contributing to the membrane potential, the potential decreases back to its resting potential as the neuron repolarizes and subsequently hyperpolarizes itself, and this constitutes the falling phase of an action potential. The refractory period of each channel is therefore vital in propagating the action potential unidirectionally down an axon for proper communication between neurons.

When the membrane's voltage becomes low enough, the inactivation gate reopens and the activation gate closes in a process called deinactivation. With the activation gate closed and the inactivation gate open, the Na^{+} channel is once again in its deactivated state, and is ready to participate in another action potential.

When any kind of ion channel does not inactivate itself, it is said to be persistently (or tonically) active. Some kinds of ion channels are naturally persistently active. However, genetic mutations that cause persistent activity in other channels can cause disease by creating excessive activity of certain kinds of neurons. Mutations that interfere with Na^{+} channel inactivation can contribute to cardiovascular diseases or epileptic seizures by window currents, which can cause muscle and/or nerve cells to become over-excited.

==== Modeling the behavior of gates ====
The temporal behavior of Na^{+} channels can be modeled by a Markovian scheme or by the Hodgkin–Huxley-type formalism. In the former scheme, each channel occupies a distinct state with differential equations describing transitions between states; in the latter, the channels are treated as a population that are affected by three independent gating variables. Each of these variables can attain a value between 1 (fully permeant to ions) and 0 (fully non-permeant), the product of these variables yielding the percentage of conducting channels. The Hodgkin–Huxley model can be shown to be equivalent to a Markovian model.

== Impermeability to other ions ==
The pore of sodium channels contains a selectivity filter made of negatively charged amino acid residues, which attract the positive Na^{+} ion and keep out negatively charged ions such as chloride. The cations flow into a more constricted part of the pore that is 0.3 by 0.5 nm wide, which is just large enough to allow a single Na^{+} ion with a water molecule associated to pass through. The larger K^{+} ion cannot fit through this area. Ions of different sizes also cannot interact as well with the negatively charged glutamic acid residues that line the pore.

== Diversity ==
Voltage-gated sodium channels normally consist of an alpha subunit that forms the ion conduction pore and one to two beta subunits that have several functions including modulation of channel gating. Expression of the alpha subunit alone is sufficient to produce a functional channel.

=== Alpha subunits ===
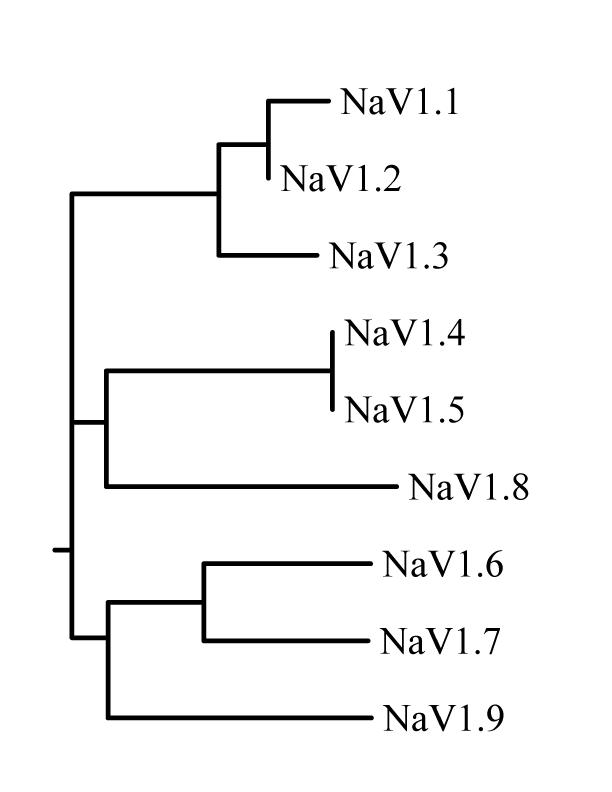
Figure 1. Likely evolutionary relationship of the nine known human sodium channels.

The family of sodium channels has 9 known members, with amino acid identity >50% in the trans-membrane segments and extracellular loop regions. A standardized nomenclature for sodium channels is currently used and is maintained by the IUPHAR.

The proteins of these channels are named Na_{v}1.1 through Na_{v}1.9. The gene names are referred to as SCN1A through SCN5A, then SCN8A through SCN11A. The "tenth member", Na_{x}, does not act in a voltage-gated way. It has a loosely similar overall structure. Not much is known about its real function, other than that it also associates with beta subunits.

The probable evolutionary relationship between these channels, based on the similarity of their amino acid sequences, is shown in figure 1. The individual sodium channels are distinguished not only by differences in their sequence but also by their kinetics and expression profiles. Some of this data is summarized in table 1, below.

Table 1. Nomenclature and some functions of voltage-gated sodium channel alpha subunits
Protein name	Gene	Expression profile	Associated human channelopathies
Na_{v}1.1	SCN1A	Central neurons, [peripheral neurons] and cardiac myocytes	febrile epilepsy, GEFS+, Dravet syndrome (also known as severe myclonic epilepsy of infancy or SMEI), borderline SMEI (SMEB), West syndrome (also known as infantile spasms), Doose syndrome (also known as myoclonic astatic epilepsy), intractable childhood epilepsy with generalized tonic-clonic seizures (ICEGTC), Panayiotopoulos syndrome, familial hemiplegic migraine (FHM), familial autism, Rasmussens's encephalitis and Lennox-Gastaut syndrome
Na_{v}1.2	SCN2A	Central neurons, peripheral neurons	inherited febrile seizures, epilepsy, and autism spectrum disorder
Na_{v}1.3	SCN3A	Central neurons, peripheral neurons and cardiac myocytes	epilepsy, pain, brain malformations
Na_{v}1.4	SCN4A	Skeletal muscle	hyperkalemic periodic paralysis, paramyotonia congenita, and potassium-aggravated myotonia
Na_{v}1.5	SCN5A	Cardiac myocytes, uninnervated skeletal muscle, central neurons, gastrointestinal smooth muscle cells and Interstitial cells of Cajal	Cardiac: Long QT syndrome Type 3, Brugada syndrome, progressive cardiac conduction disease, familial atrial fibrillation and idiopathic ventricular fibrillation; Gastrointestinal: Irritable bowel syndrome;
Na_{v}1.6	SCN8A	Central neurons, dorsal root ganglia, peripheral neurons, heart, glia cells	Epilepsy, ataxia, dystonia, tremor
Na_{v}1.7	SCN9A	Dorsal root ganglia, sympathetic neurons, Schwann cells, and neuroendocrine cells	erythromelalgia, PEPD, channelopathy-associated insensitivity to pain and recently discovered a disabling form of fibromyalgia (rs6754031 polymorphism)
Na_{v}1.8	SCN10A	Dorsal root ganglia	pain, neuropsychiatric disorders
Na_{v}1.9	SCN11A	Dorsal root ganglia	pain
Na_{x}	SCN7A	heart, uterus, skeletal muscle, astrocytes, dorsal root ganglion cells	none known

=== Beta subunits ===
Sodium channel beta subunits are type 1 transmembrane glycoproteins with an extracellular N-terminus and a cytoplasmic C-terminus. As members of the Ig superfamily, beta subunits contain a prototypic V-set Ig loop in their extracellular domain. They do not share any homology with their counterparts of calcium and potassium channels. Instead, they are homologous to neural cell adhesion molecules (CAMs) and the large family of L1 CAMs. There are four distinct betas named in order of discovery: SCN1B, SCN2B, SCN3B, SCN4B (table 2). Beta 1 and beta 3 interact with the alpha subunit non-covalently, whereas beta 2 and beta 4 associate with alpha via disulfide bond. Sodium channels are more likely to stay open at the subthreshold membrane potential when interacting with beta toxins, which in turn induces an immediate sensation of pain.

=== Role of beta subunits as cell adhesion molecules ===
In addition to regulating channel gating, sodium channel beta subunits also modulate channel expression and form links to the intracellular cytoskeleton via ankyrin and spectrin. Voltage-gated sodium channels also assemble with a variety of other proteins, such as FHF proteins (Fibroblast growth factor Homologous Factor), calmodulin, cytoskeleton or regulatory kinases, which form a complex with sodium channels, influencing its expression and/or function. Several beta subunits interact with one or more extracellular matrix (ECM) molecules. Contactin, also known as F3 or F11, associates with beta 1 as shown via co-immunoprecipitation. Fibronectin-like (FN-like) repeats of Tenascin-C and Tenascin-R bind with beta 2 in contrast to the Epidermal growth factor-like (EGF-like) repeats that repel beta2. A disintegrin and metalloproteinase (ADAM) 10 sheds beta 2's ectodomain possibly inducing neurite outgrowth. Beta 3 and beta 1 bind to neurofascin at Nodes of Ranvier in developing neurons.

Table 2. Nomenclature and some functions of voltage-gated sodium channel beta subunits
Protein name	Gene link	Assembles with	Expression profile	Associated human channelopathies
Na_{v}β1	SCN1B	Na_{v}1.1 to Na_{v}1.7	Central Neurons, Peripheral Neurons, skeletal muscle, heart, glia	epilepsy (GEFS+), Brugada syndrome
Na_{v}β2	SCN2B	Na_{v}1.1, Na_{v}1.2, Na_{v}1.5 to Na_{v}1.7	Central Neurons, peripheral neurons, heart, glia	Brugada syndrome
Na_{v}β3	SCN3B	Na_{v}1.1 to Na_{v}1.3, Na_{v}1.5	central neurons, adrenal gland, kidney, peripheral neurons	Brugada syndrome
Na_{v}β4	SCN4B	Na_{v}1.1, Na_{v}1.2, Na_{v}1.5	heart, skeletal muscle, central and peripheral neurons	none known

== Evolution ==
A voltage-gated sodium channel is present in members of the choanoflagellates, thought to be the closest living, unicellular relative of animals. This suggests that an ancestral form of the animal channel was among the many proteins that play central roles in animal life, but which are thought to have evolved before multicellularity. The four-domain animal voltage-gated sodium channel likely evolved from a single-subunit ion channel, which was probably permeable for potassium ions, via a sequence of two duplication events. This model draws support from the fact that subunits I and III (and II and IV) group by similarity, suggesting that a two-channel intermediate generated from the first duplication existed long enough for divergence to occur between its two subunits. After the second duplication, the channel was left with two sets of similar domains. The resulting four-domain channel is thought to have been permeable primarily for calcium, and to have achieved sodium selectivity a number of times independently. After divergence from the invertebrates, the vertebrate lineage underwent two whole-genome duplications (WGDs), yielding a set of four sodium channel gene prologues in the ancestral vertebrate, all of which were retained. After the tetrapod/teleost split, the teleosts likely underwent a third WGD leading to the eight sodium channel prologues expressed in many modern fishes. The modern, ten-paralogue sodium gene complement of mammals is thought to have arisen from a series of parallel and nested duplications involving two of the four paralogues present in the ancestor of all tetrapods.

=== In electric fishes ===
Several fishes possess an electric organ functioning with voltage-gated sodium channels, allowing them to communicate, immobilize preys or deter predators, depending on the fish. Electric organs used in communication have evolved independently at least twice: in the Gymnotiformes of South America and the Mormyriformes of Africa. In non-electric fishes the channels Na_{v}1.4a and Na_{v}1.4b are present in the muscles, while in Gymnotiformes and Mormyriformes Na_{v}1.4a has disappeared in the muscles and is expressed in the electric organ.

== See also ==
- Gating (electrophysiology)
- Ligand-gated ion channel
- List of investigational analgesics
- Sodium channel blocker

== Sources ==
This article incorporates text by Maryam Iman, Atefeh Saadabadi, and Asghar Davood available under the CC BY 4.0 license.
