= SCN5A =

Protein-coding gene in the species Homo sapiens

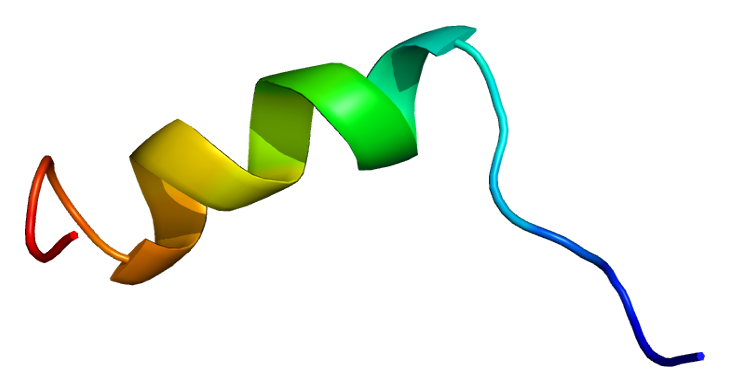

Identifiers
- Aliases: SCN5A, CDCD2, CMD1E, CMPD2, HB1, HB2, HBBD, HH1, ICCD, IVF, LQT3, Nav1.5, PFHB1, SSS1, VF1, sodium voltage-gated channel alpha subunit 5
- External IDs: OMIM: 600163; MGI: 98251; GeneCards: SCN5A
Available structures
PDB	Ortholog search: PDBe RCSB
PDB	List of PDB id codes 2KBI, 2L53, 4DCK, 4DJC, 4JQ0, 4OVN

Gene location (Human)
Chr.	Chromosome 3 (human)
Band	3p22.2	Start	38,548,057 bp
Band	3p22.2	End	38,649,687 bp

Gene location (Mouse)
Chr.	Chromosome 9 (mouse)
Band	9 F3|9 71.33 cM	Start	119,312,474 bp
Band	9 F3|9 71.33 cM	End	119,408,082 bp
RNA expression pattern
Bgee	Human / Mouse (ortholog); Top expressed in: apex of heart; left ventricle; right auricle of heart; myocardium of left ventricle; right ventricle; cardiac muscle tissue of right atrium; testicle; gonad; secondary oocyte; sural nerve / Top expressed in: myocardium of ventricle; atrium; Meckel's cartilage; right ventricle; rib; olfactory epithelium; scapula; cardiac muscles; atrioventricular valve; endothelial cell of lymphatic vessel; More reference expression data
BioGPS	n/a
Gene ontology
Molecular function	nitric-oxide synthase binding; transmembrane transporter binding; protein domain specific binding; voltage-gated sodium channel activity involved in AV node cell action potential; voltage-gated sodium channel activity involved in bundle of His cell action potential; sodium channel activity; voltage-gated sodium channel activity involved in SA node cell action potential; voltage-gated ion channel activity; ion channel activity; voltage-gated sodium channel activity involved in Purkinje myocyte action potential; protein binding; ankyrin binding; enzyme binding; fibroblast growth factor binding; voltage-gated sodium channel activity involved in cardiac muscle cell action potential; scaffold protein binding; protein kinase binding; ubiquitin protein ligase binding; voltage-gated sodium channel activity; calmodulin binding
Cellular component	voltage-gated sodium channel complex; integral component of membrane; lateral plasma membrane; membrane; intercalated disc; T-tubule; intracellular anatomical structure; cell surface; Z discdkac; endoplasmic reticulum; caveola; sarcolemma; plasma membrane; cytoplasm; perinuclear region of cytoplasm; axon
Biological process	regulation of atrial cardiac muscle cell membrane repolarization; cellular response to calcium ion; membrane depolarization during AV node cell action potential; regulation of ventricular cardiac muscle cell membrane depolarization; membrane depolarization during Purkinje myocyte cell action potential; membrane depolarization during bundle of His cell action potential; membrane depolarization during action potential; cardiac muscle contraction; sodium ion transmembrane transport; sodium ion transport; positive regulation of epithelial cell proliferation; SA node cell action potential; brainstem development; cardiac ventricle development; regulation of atrial cardiac muscle cell membrane depolarization; membrane depolarization; ventricular cardiac muscle cell action potential; bundle of His cell action potential; cardiac muscle cell action potential involved in contraction; regulation of ion transmembrane transport; ion transport; cerebellum development; regulation of heart rate; odontogenesis of dentin-containing tooth; positive regulation of action potential; regulation of cardiac muscle cell contraction; telencephalon development; AV node cell to bundle of His cell communication; transmembrane transport; positive regulation of sodium ion transport; membrane depolarization during SA node cell action potential; response to denervation involved in regulation of muscle adaptation; regulation of sodium ion transmembrane transport; AV node cell action potential; regulation of heart rate by cardiac conduction; membrane depolarization during cardiac muscle cell action potential; neuronal action potential; regulation of ventricular cardiac muscle cell membrane repolarization; atrial cardiac muscle cell action potential; membrane depolarization during atrial cardiac muscle cell action potential; cardiac conduction
Sources:Amigo / QuickGO
Orthologs
Databases	NCBI: entry; OMA: entry
Species	Human	Mouse
Entrez	6331	20271
Ensembl	ENSG00000183873	ENSMUSG00000032511
UniProt	Q14524	Q9JJV9
RefSeq (mRNA)	NM_000335; NM_001099404; NM_001099405; NM_001160160; NM_001160161 NM_198056; NM_001354701	NM_001253860; NM_021544
RefSeq (protein)	NP_000326; NP_001092874; NP_001092875; NP_001153632; NP_001153633 NP_932173; NP_001341630	NP_001240789; NP_067519
Location (UCSC)	Chr 3: 38.55 – 38.65 Mb	Chr 9: 119.31 – 119.41 Mb
PubMed search
- Wikidata
View/Edit Human	View/Edit Mouse

Sodium channel protein type 5 subunit alpha, also known as Na_{V}1.5 is an integral membrane protein and tetrodotoxin-resistant voltage-gated sodium channel subunit. Na_{V}1.5 is found primarily in cardiac muscle, where it mediates the fast influx of Na^{+}-ions (I_{Na}) across the cell membrane, resulting in the fast depolarization phase of the cardiac action potential. As such, it plays a major role in impulse propagation through the heart. A vast number of cardiac diseases are associated with mutations in Na_{V}1.5 (see paragraph genetics). SCN5A is the gene that encodes the cardiac sodium channel Na_{V}1.5.

== Gene structure ==
SCN5A is a highly conserved gene located on human chromosome 3, where it spans more than 100 kb. The gene consists of 28 exons, of which exon 1 and in part exon 2 form the 5' untranslated region (5’UTR) and exon 28 the 3' untranslated region (3’UTR) of the RNA. SCN5A is part of a family of 10 genes that encode different types of sodium channels, i.e. brain-type (Na_{V}1.1, Na_{V}1.2, Na_{V}1.3, Na_{V}1.6), neuronal channels (Na_{V}1.7, Na_{V}1.8 and Na_{V}1.9), skeletal muscle channels (Na_{V}1.4) and the cardiac sodium channel Na_{V}1.5.

=== Expression pattern ===
SCN5A is mainly expressed in the heart, where expression is abundant in working myocardium and conduction tissue. In contrast, expression is low in the sinoatrial node and atrioventricular node. Within the heart, a transmural expression gradient from subendocardium to subsepicardium is present, with higher expression of SCN5A in the endocardium as compared to the epicardium. SCN5A is also expressed in the gastrointestinal tract.

=== Splice variants ===
More than 10 different splice isoforms have been described for SCN5A, of which several harbour different functional properties. In the heart, two isoforms are mainly expressed (ratio 1:2), of which the least predominant one contains an extra glutamine at position 1077 (1077Q). Moreover, different isoforms are expressed during fetal life and adult, differing in the inclusion of an alternative exon 6.

== Protein structure and function ==
Na_{V}1.5 is a large transmembrane protein with 4 repetitive transmembrane domains (DI-DIV), containing 6 transmembrane spanning sections each (S1-S6). The pore region of the channels, through which Na+-ions flow, are formed by the segments S5 and S6 of the 4 domains. Voltage sensing is mediated by the remaining segments, of which the positively charged S4 segments plays a fundamental role.

Na_{V}1.5 channels predominantly mediate the sodium current (I_{Na}) in cardiac cells. I_{Na} is responsible for the fast upstroke of the action potential, and as such plays a crucial role in impulse propagation through the heart. The conformational state of the channel, which is both voltage and time-dependent, determines whether the channel is opened or closed. At the resting membrane potential (around -85 mV), Na_{V}1.5 channels are closed. Upon a stimulus (through conduction by a neighboring cell), the membrane depolarizes and Na_{V}1.5 channels open through the outward movement of the S4 segments, leading to the initiation of the action potential. Simultaneously, a process called 'fast inactivation' results in closure of the channels within a few milliseconds. In physiological conditions, when inactivated, channels remain in closed state until the cell membrane repolarizes, where a recovery from inactivation is necessary before they become available for activation again. During the action potential, a very small fraction of sodium current persists and does not inactivate completely. This current is called 'sustained current', 'late current' or 'I_{Na,L}’. Also, some channels may reactivate during the repolarizing phase of the action potential at a range of potentials where inactivation is not complete and shows overlap with activation, generating the so-called "window current".

=== Sub-units and protein interaction partners ===
Trafficking, function and structure of Na_{V}1.5 can be affected by the many protein interaction partners that have been identified to date (for an extensive review, see Abriel et al. 2010). Of these, the 4 sodium channel beta-subunits, encoded by the genes SCN1B, SCN2B, SCN3B and SCN4B, form an important category. In general, beta-subunits increase function of Na_{V}1.5, either by change in intrinsic properties or by affecting the process of trafficking to the cell surface.

Apart from the beta-subunits, other proteins, such as calmodulin, calmodulin kinase II δc, ankyrin-G and plakophilin-2, are known to interact and modulate function of Na_{V}1.5. Some of these have also been linked to genetic and acquired cardiac diseases.

== Genetics ==
Mutations in SCN5A, which could result in a loss and/or a gain-of-function of the channel, are associated with a spectrum of cardiac diseases. Pathogenic mutations generally exhibit an autosomal dominant inheritance pattern, although compound heterozygote forms of SCN5A mutations are also described. Also, mutations may act as a disease modifier, especially in families where lack of direct causality is reflected by complex inheritance patterns. A significant number of individuals (2-7%) in the general population carry a rare (population frequency <1%), protein-altering variant in the gene, highlighting the complexity of linking mutations directly with observed phenotypes. Mutations that result in the same biophysical effect can give rise to different diseases.

To date, loss-of-function mutations have been associated with Brugada syndrome (BrS), progressive cardiac conduction disease (Lev-Lenègre disease), dilated cardiomyopathy (DCM), sick sinus syndrome, and atrial fibrillation.

Mutations resulting in a gain-of-function are causal for Long QT syndrome type 3 and are also more recently implicated in multifocal ectopic Purkinje-related premature contractions (MEPPC) Some gain-of-function mutations are also associated with AF and DCM. Gain-of-function of Na_{V}1.5 is generally reflected by an increase in I_{Na,L}, a slowed rate of inactivation or a shift in voltage dependence of activation or inactivation (resulting in an increased window-current).

SCN5A mutations are believed to be found in a disproportionate number of people who have Irritable Bowel Syndrome, particularly the constipation-predominant variant (IBS-C). The resulting defect leads to disruption in bowel function, by affecting the Nav1.5 channel, in smooth muscle of the colon and pacemaker cells. Researchers managed to treat a case of IBS-C with mexiletine to restore Nav1.5 channels, reversing constipation and abdominal pain.

=== SCN5A variations in the general population ===
Genetic variations in SCN5A, i.e. single nucleotide polymorphisms (SNPs) have been described in both coding and non-coding regions of the gene. These variations are typically present at relatively high frequencies within the general population. Genome Wide Association Studies (GWAS) have used this type of common genetic variation to identify genetic loci associated with variability in phenotypic traits. In the cardiovascular field this powerful technique has been used to detect loci involved in variation in electrocardiographic parameters (i.e. PR-, QRS- and QTc-interval duration) in the general population. The rationale behind this technique is that common genetic variation present in the general population can influence cardiac conduction in non-diseased individuals. these studies consistently identified the SCN5A-SCN10A genomic region on chromosome 3 to be associated with variation in QTc-interval, QRS duration and PR-interval. These results indicate that genetic variation at the SCN5A locus is not only involved in disease genetics but also plays a role in the variation in cardiac function between individuals in the general population.

== Na_{V}1.5 as a pharmacological target ==
The cardiac sodium channel Na_{V}1.5 has long been a common target in the pharmacologic treatment of arrhythmic events. Classically, sodium channel blockers that block the peak sodium current are classified as Class I anti-arrhythmic agents and further subdivided in class IA, IB and IC, depending on their ability to change the length of the cardiac action potential. Use of such sodium channel blockers is among others indicated in patients with ventricular reentrant tachyarrhythmia in the setting of cardiac ischemia and in patients with atrial fibrillation in absence of structural heart disease.

== See also ==
- Atrioventricular block
- Brugada syndrome
- Electrical conduction system of the heart
- Electrocardiogram (ECG)
- First-degree AV block
- long QT syndrome
- Second-degree AV block
- Sodium channel
