= GPD1L =

Protein-coding gene in humans

Identifiers
- Aliases: GPD1L, GPD1-L, glycerol-3-phosphate dehydrogenase 1-like, glycerol-3-phosphate dehydrogenase 1 like
- External IDs: OMIM: 611778; MGI: 1289257; GeneCards: GPD1L
Available structures
PDB	Ortholog search: PDBe RCSB
PDB	List of PDB id codes 2PLA
Enzyme activity
EC #	BRENDA	ExPASy	KEGG	MetaCyc
1.1.1.8	↗	↗	↗	↗

Gene location (Human)
Chr.	Chromosome 3 (human)
Band	3p22.3	Start	32,105,689 bp
Band	3p22.3	End	32,168,709 bp

Gene location (Mouse)
Chr.	Chromosome 9 (mouse)
Band	9 F3|9 65.47 cM	Start	114,728,409 bp
Band	9 F3|9 65.47 cM	End	114,763,055 bp
RNA expression pattern
Bgee	Human / Mouse (ortholog); Top expressed in: biceps brachii; right ventricle; Skeletal muscle tissue of biceps brachii; myocardium of left ventricle; triceps brachii muscle; deltoid muscle; thoracic diaphragm; cardiac muscle tissue of right atrium; glutes; body of tongue / Top expressed in: gastrula; morula; parotid gland; zygote; submandibular gland; epithelium of stomach; secondary oocyte; cervix; piriform cortex; interventricular septum; More reference expression data
BioGPS	n/a
Gene ontology
Molecular function	oxidoreductase activity, acting on the CH-OH group of donors, NAD or NADP as acceptor; sodium channel regulator activity; protein homodimerization activity; transmembrane transporter binding; NAD binding; oxidoreductase activity; glycerol-3-phosphate dehydrogenase [NAD+ activity]
Cellular component	cytoplasm; cytosol; membrane; plasma membrane; glycerol-3-phosphate dehydrogenase complex; extracellular exosome
Biological process	phosphatidic acid biosynthetic process; regulation of ventricular cardiac muscle cell membrane depolarization; negative regulation of protein kinase C signaling; glycerol-3-phosphate catabolic process; ventricular cardiac muscle cell action potential; glycerol-3-phosphate metabolic process; NAD metabolic process; regulation of heart rate; NADH metabolic process; regulation of sodium ion transmembrane transporter activity; positive regulation of protein localization to cell surface; positive regulation of sodium ion transport; negative regulation of peptidyl-serine phosphorylation; carbohydrate metabolic process; action potential; NADH oxidation
Sources:Amigo / QuickGO
Orthologs
Databases	NCBI: entry; OMA: entry
Species	Human	Mouse
Entrez	23171	333433
Ensembl	ENSG00000152642	ENSMUSG00000050627
UniProt	Q8N335	Q3ULJ0
RefSeq (mRNA)	NM_015141	NM_175380
RefSeq (protein)	NP_055956	NP_780589
Location (UCSC)	Chr 3: 32.11 – 32.17 Mb	Chr 9: 114.73 – 114.76 Mb
PubMed search
- Wikidata
View/Edit Human	View/Edit Mouse

Glycerol-3-phosphate dehydrogenase 1-like protein is a protein that in humans is encoded by the GPD1L gene. The protein encoded by this gene contains a glycerol-3-phosphate dehydrogenase (NAD+) motif and shares 72% sequence identity with GPD1.

== Structure ==
GPD1L contains the following domains:

- N-terminal – NAD+ consensus binding site
- a site homologous to the cardiac sodium channel SCN5A
- C-terminal lysine-206 residue

== Tissue distribution ==
Northern blot analysis detected a single GPD1L transcript in all tissues examined except liver. Highest expression was in heart and skeletal muscle.

== Disease linkage ==
Mutations in the GPD1L gene are associated with the Brugada syndrome and sudden infant death syndrome.

== See also ==
- Glycerol-3-phosphate dehydrogenase
