= Sodium channel =

Transmembrane protein allowing sodium ions in and out

Sodium channel (c) shown in dark green. Light green circles (a) are sodium ions. Purple triangles (b) are potassium ions.

Sodium channels are integral membrane proteins that form ion channels, conducting sodium ions (Na^{+}) through a cell's membrane. They belong to the superfamily of cation channels.

== Classification ==
Sodium channels are classified into 3 types:

Type	Synonyms	Trigger (Factor that stimulates the channel)
Voltage-gated sodium channels	"VGSCs"; "Voltage-dependent"; "Voltage-sensitive"; "Nav channel"	Change in membrane potential, (also called "change in voltage").
Ligand-gated sodium channels	LGSCs	Binding of substances such as ligands to the channel.
Leak sodium channel	NALCN	Ungated, always open.

== Function ==
In excitable cells (such as neurons, myocytes, and certain types of glia), sodium channels enable the rising phase of action potentials. These channels go through three different states: resting, active, and inactive. Even though the resting and inactive states do not allow ions to flow through the channels, the difference exists with respect to their structural conformation.

== Selectivity ==
Sodium channels are highly selective for transporting sodium ions across cell membranes. The high selectivity with respect to the sodium ion is achieved in many different ways. All involve encapsulating the sodium ion in a cavity of specific size within a larger molecule.

== Voltage-gated sodium channels ==
=== Structure ===
Diagram of a voltage-sensitive sodium channel α-subunit. G – glycosylation, P – phosphorylation, S – ion selectivity, I – inactivation. Positive (+) charges in S4 are important for transmembrane voltage sensing.

Sodium channels consist of large alpha subunits that associate with accessory proteins, such as beta subunits. An alpha subunit forms the core of the channel and is functional on its own. When the alpha subunit protein is expressed by a cell, it is able to form a pore in the cell membrane that conducts Na^{+} in a voltage-dependent way, even if beta subunits or other known modulating proteins are not expressed. When accessory proteins assemble with α subunits, the resulting complex can display altered voltage dependence and cellular localization.

The alpha subunit consists of four repeat domains, labelled I through IV, each containing six membrane-spanning segments, labelled S1 through S6. The highly conserved S4 segment acts as the channel's voltage sensor. The voltage sensitivity of this channel is due to positive amino acids located at every third position. When stimulated by a change in transmembrane voltage, this segment moves toward the extracellular side of the cell membrane, allowing the channel to become permeable to ions. The ions are conducted through the central pore cavity, which consists of two main regions. The more external (i.e., more extracellular) portion of the pore is formed by the "P-loops" (the region between S5 and S6) of the four domains. This region is the most narrow part of the pore and is responsible for its ion selectivity. The inner portion (i.e., more cytoplasmic) of the pore is the pore gate and is formed by the combined S5 and S6 segments of the four domains. The pore domain also features lateral tunnels or fenestrations that run perpendicular to the pore axis. These fenestrations that connect the central cavity to the membrane are proposed to be important for drug accessibility.

In mammalian sodium channels, the region linking domains III and IV is also important for channel function. This DIII-IV linker is responsible for wedging the pore gate shut after channel opening, inactivating it.

=== Gating ===
Voltage-gated Na^{+} channels have three main conformational states: closed, open and inactivated. Forward/back transitions between these states are correspondingly referred to as activation/deactivation (between open and closed, respectively), inactivation/reactivation (between inactivated and open, respectively), and recovery from inactivation/closed-state inactivation (between inactivated and closed, respectively). Closed and inactivated states are ion impermeable.

Before an action potential occurs, the axonal membrane is at its normal resting potential, about −70 mV in most human neurons, and Na^{+} channels are in their deactivated state, blocked on the extracellular side by their activation gates. In response to an increase of the membrane potential to about −55 mV (in this case, caused by an action potential), the activation gates open, allowing positively charged Na^{+} ions to flow into the neuron through the channels, and causing the voltage across the neuronal membrane to increase to +30 mV in human neurons. Because the voltage across the membrane is initially negative, as its voltage increases to and past zero (from −70 mV at rest to a maximum of +30 mV), it is said to depolarize. This increase in voltage constitutes the rising phase of an action potential.

Action Potential	Membrane Potential	Target Potential	Gate's Target State	Neuron's Target State
Resting	−70 mV	−55 mV	Deactivated → Activated	Polarized
Rising	−55 mV	0 mV	Activated	Polarized → Depolarized
Rising	0 mV	+30 mV	Activated → Inactivated	Depolarized
Falling	+30 mV	0 mV	Inactivated	Depolarized → Repolarized
Falling	0 mV	−70 mV	Inactivated	Repolarized
Undershot	−70 mV	−75 mV	Inactivated → Deactivated	Repolarized → Hyperpolarized
Rebounding	−75 mV	−70 mV	Deactivated	Hyperpolarized → Polarized

At the peak of the action potential, when enough Na^{+} has entered the neuron and the membrane's potential has become high enough, the Na^{+} channels inactivate themselves by closing their inactivation gates. The inactivation gate can be thought of as a "plug" tethered to domains III and IV of the channel's intracellular alpha subunit. Closure of the inactivation gate causes Na^{+} flow through the channel to stop, which in turn causes the membrane potential to stop rising. The closing of the inactivation gate creates a refractory period within each individual Na^{+} channel. This refractory period eliminates the possibility of an action potential moving in the opposite direction back towards the soma. With its inactivation gate closed, the channel is said to be inactivated. With the Na^{+} channel no longer contributing to the membrane potential, the potential decreases back to its resting potential as the neuron repolarizes and subsequently hyperpolarizes itself, and this constitutes the falling phase of an action potential. The refractory period of each channel is therefore vital in propagating the action potential unidirectionally down an axon for proper communication between neurons.

When the membrane's voltage becomes low enough, the inactivation gate reopens and the activation gate closes in a process called deinactivation. With the activation gate closed and the inactivation gate open, the Na^{+} channel is once again in its deactivated state, and is ready to participate in another action potential.

When any kind of ion channel does not inactivate itself, it is said to be persistently (or tonically) active. Some kinds of ion channels are naturally persistently active. However, genetic mutations that cause persistent activity in other channels can cause disease by creating excessive activity of certain kinds of neurons. Mutations that interfere with Na^{+} channel inactivation can contribute to cardiovascular diseases or epileptic seizures by window currents, which can cause muscle and/or nerve cells to become over-excited.

==== Modeling the behavior of gates ====
The temporal behavior of Na^{+} channels can be modeled by a Markovian scheme or by the Hodgkin–Huxley-type formalism. In the former scheme, each channel occupies a distinct state with differential equations describing transitions between states; in the latter, the channels are treated as a population that are affected by three independent gating variables. Each of these variables can attain a value between 1 (fully permeant to ions) and 0 (fully non-permeant), the product of these variables yielding the percentage of conducting channels. The Hodgkin–Huxley model can be shown to be equivalent to a Markovian model.

=== Impermeability to other ions ===
The pore of sodium channels contains a selectivity filter made of negatively charged amino acid residues, which attract the positive Na^{+} ion and keep out negatively charged ions such as chloride. The cations flow into a more constricted part of the pore that is 0.3 by 0.5 nm wide, which is just large enough to allow a single Na^{+} ion with a water molecule associated to pass through. The larger K^{+} ion cannot fit through this area. Ions of different sizes also cannot interact as well with the negatively charged glutamic acid residues that line the pore.

=== Diversity ===
Voltage-gated sodium channels normally consist of an alpha subunit that forms the ion conduction pore and one to two beta subunits that have several functions including modulation of channel gating. Expression of the alpha subunit alone is sufficient to produce a functional channel.

==== Alpha subunits ====
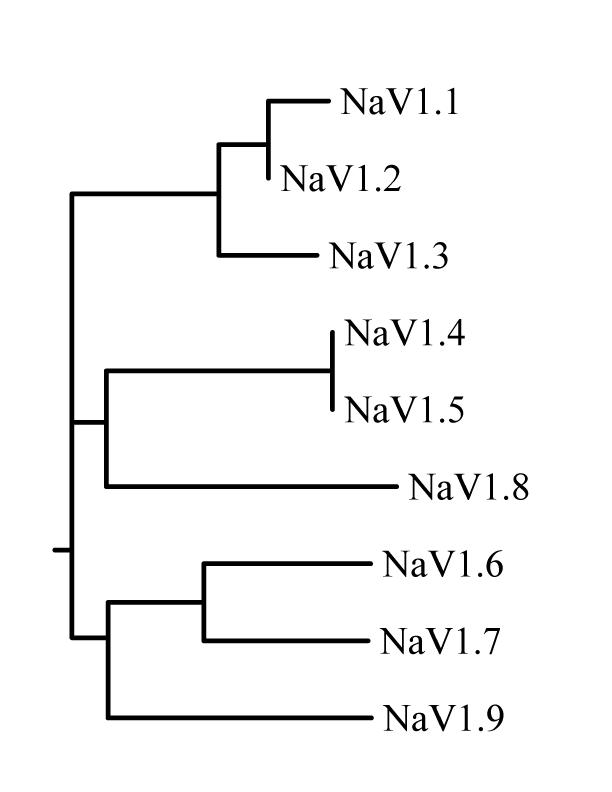
Figure 1. Likely evolutionary relationship of the nine known human sodium channels.

The family of sodium channels has 9 known members, with amino acid identity >50% in the trans-membrane segments and extracellular loop regions. A standardized nomenclature for sodium channels is currently used and is maintained by the IUPHAR.

The proteins of these channels are named Na_{v}1.1 through Na_{v}1.9. The gene names are referred to as SCN1A through SCN5A, then SCN8A through SCN11A. The "tenth member", Na_{x}, does not act in a voltage-gated way. It has a loosely similar overall structure. Not much is known about its real function, other than that it also associates with beta subunits.

The probable evolutionary relationship between these channels, based on the similarity of their amino acid sequences, is shown in figure 1. The individual sodium channels are distinguished not only by differences in their sequence but also by their kinetics and expression profiles. Some of this data is summarized in table 1, below.

Table 1. Nomenclature and some functions of voltage-gated sodium channel alpha subunits
Protein name	Gene	Expression profile	Associated human channelopathies
Na_{v}1.1	SCN1A	Central neurons, [peripheral neurons] and cardiac myocytes	febrile epilepsy, GEFS+, Dravet syndrome (also known as severe myclonic epilepsy of infancy or SMEI), borderline SMEI (SMEB), West syndrome (also known as infantile spasms), Doose syndrome (also known as myoclonic astatic epilepsy), intractable childhood epilepsy with generalized tonic-clonic seizures (ICEGTC), Panayiotopoulos syndrome, familial hemiplegic migraine (FHM), familial autism, Rasmussens's encephalitis and Lennox-Gastaut syndrome
Na_{v}1.2	SCN2A	Central neurons, peripheral neurons	inherited febrile seizures, epilepsy, and autism spectrum disorder
Na_{v}1.3	SCN3A	Central neurons, peripheral neurons and cardiac myocytes	epilepsy, pain, brain malformations
Na_{v}1.4	SCN4A	Skeletal muscle	hyperkalemic periodic paralysis, paramyotonia congenita, and potassium-aggravated myotonia
Na_{v}1.5	SCN5A	Cardiac myocytes, uninnervated skeletal muscle, central neurons, gastrointestinal smooth muscle cells and Interstitial cells of Cajal	Cardiac: Long QT syndrome Type 3, Brugada syndrome, progressive cardiac conduction disease, familial atrial fibrillation and idiopathic ventricular fibrillation; Gastrointestinal: Irritable bowel syndrome;
Na_{v}1.6	SCN8A	Central neurons, dorsal root ganglia, peripheral neurons, heart, glia cells	Epilepsy, ataxia, dystonia, tremor
Na_{v}1.7	SCN9A	Dorsal root ganglia, sympathetic neurons, Schwann cells, and neuroendocrine cells	erythromelalgia, PEPD, channelopathy-associated insensitivity to pain and recently discovered a disabling form of fibromyalgia (rs6754031 polymorphism)
Na_{v}1.8	SCN10A	Dorsal root ganglia	pain, neuropsychiatric disorders
Na_{v}1.9	SCN11A	Dorsal root ganglia	pain
Na_{x}	SCN7A	heart, uterus, skeletal muscle, astrocytes, dorsal root ganglion cells	none known

==== Beta subunits ====
Sodium channel beta subunits are type 1 transmembrane glycoproteins with an extracellular N-terminus and a cytoplasmic C-terminus. As members of the Ig superfamily, beta subunits contain a prototypic V-set Ig loop in their extracellular domain. They do not share any homology with their counterparts of calcium and potassium channels. Instead, they are homologous to neural cell adhesion molecules (CAMs) and the large family of L1 CAMs. There are four distinct betas named in order of discovery: SCN1B, SCN2B, SCN3B, SCN4B (table 2). Beta 1 and beta 3 interact with the alpha subunit non-covalently, whereas beta 2 and beta 4 associate with alpha via disulfide bond. Sodium channels are more likely to stay open at the subthreshold membrane potential when interacting with beta toxins, which in turn induces an immediate sensation of pain.

==== Role of beta subunits as cell adhesion molecules ====
In addition to regulating channel gating, sodium channel beta subunits also modulate channel expression and form links to the intracellular cytoskeleton via ankyrin and spectrin. Voltage-gated sodium channels also assemble with a variety of other proteins, such as FHF proteins (Fibroblast growth factor Homologous Factor), calmodulin, cytoskeleton or regulatory kinases, which form a complex with sodium channels, influencing its expression and/or function. Several beta subunits interact with one or more extracellular matrix (ECM) molecules. Contactin, also known as F3 or F11, associates with beta 1 as shown via co-immunoprecipitation. Fibronectin-like (FN-like) repeats of Tenascin-C and Tenascin-R bind with beta 2 in contrast to the Epidermal growth factor-like (EGF-like) repeats that repel beta2. A disintegrin and metalloproteinase (ADAM) 10 sheds beta 2's ectodomain possibly inducing neurite outgrowth. Beta 3 and beta 1 bind to neurofascin at Nodes of Ranvier in developing neurons.

Table 2. Nomenclature and some functions of voltage-gated sodium channel beta subunits
Protein name	Gene link	Assembles with	Expression profile	Associated human channelopathies
Na_{v}β1	SCN1B	Na_{v}1.1 to Na_{v}1.7	Central Neurons, Peripheral Neurons, skeletal muscle, heart, glia	epilepsy (GEFS+), Brugada syndrome
Na_{v}β2	SCN2B	Na_{v}1.1, Na_{v}1.2, Na_{v}1.5 to Na_{v}1.7	Central Neurons, peripheral neurons, heart, glia	Brugada syndrome
Na_{v}β3	SCN3B	Na_{v}1.1 to Na_{v}1.3, Na_{v}1.5	central neurons, adrenal gland, kidney, peripheral neurons	Brugada syndrome
Na_{v}β4	SCN4B	Na_{v}1.1, Na_{v}1.2, Na_{v}1.5	heart, skeletal muscle, central and peripheral neurons	none known

== Ligand-gated sodium channels ==
Ligand-gated sodium channels are activated by binding of a ligand instead of a change in membrane potential.

They are found, e.g. in the neuromuscular junction as nicotinic receptors, where the ligands are acetylcholine molecules. Most channels of this type are permeable to potassium to some degree as well as to sodium.

== Role in action potential ==
Voltage-gated sodium channels play an important role in action potentials. If enough channels open when there is a change in the cell's membrane potential, a small but significant number of Na^{+} ions will move into the cell down their electrochemical gradient, further depolarizing the cell. Thus, the more Na^{+} channels localized in a region of a cell's membrane the faster the action potential will propagate and the more excitable that area of the cell will be. This is an example of a positive feedback loop. The ability of these channels to assume a closed-inactivated state causes the refractory period and is critical for the propagation of action potentials down an axon.

Na^{+} channels both open and close more quickly than K^{+} channels, producing an influx of positive charge (Na^{+}) toward the beginning of the action potential and an efflux (K^{+}) toward the end.

Ligand-gated sodium channels, on the other hand, create the change in the membrane potential in the first place, in response to the binding of a ligand to it. Leak sodium channels additionally contribute to action potential regulation by modulating the resting potential (and in turn, the excitability) of a cell.

== Pharmacologic modulation ==
=== Activators ===
The following naturally produced substances persistently activate (open) sodium channels:

- Alkaloid-based toxins
  - aconitine
  - batrachotoxin
  - brevetoxin
  - ciguatoxin
  - delphinine
  - some grayanotoxins, e.g., grayanotoxin I (other granotoxins inactive, or close, sodium channels)
  - veratridine

=== Gating modifiers ===
The following toxins modify the gating of sodium channels:

- Peptide-based toxins
  - μ-Conotoxin
  - δ-Atracotoxin
  - Scorpion venom toxins

== Sodium leak channel (NALCN) ==
Sodium leak channels do not show any voltage or ligand gating. Instead, they are always open or "leaking" a small background current to regulate the resting membrane potential of a neuron. In most animals, a single gene encodes the NALCN (sodium leak channel, nonselective) protein.

=== Structural and functional differences ===
Despite following the same basic structure as other sodium channels, NALCN is not sensitive to voltage changes. The voltage-sensitive S4 transmembrane domain of NALCN has fewer positively charged amino acids (13 instead of a voltage gated channel's 21) possibly explaining its voltage insensitivity. NALCN is also far less selective for Na^{+} ions and is permeable to Ca^{2+} and K^{+} ions. The EEKE amino acid motif in the pore filter domain of NALCN is similar to both the EEEE motif of voltage-gated calcium channel and the DEKA motif of the voltage-gated sodium channel, possibly explaining its lack of selectivity.

Regulatory pathways and chemicals affecting NALCN function.

NALCN is not blocked by many common sodium channel blockers, including tetrodotoxin. NALCN is blocked nonspecifically by both Gd^{3+} and verapamil. Substance P and neurotensin both activate Src family kinases through their respective GPCRs (independent of the coupled G-proteins) which in turn increase the permeability of NALCN through UNC80 activation. Acetylcholine can also increase NALCN activity through M_{3} muscarinic acetylcholine receptors. Higher levels of extracellular Ca^{2+} decrease the permeability of NALCN by activating CaSR which inhibits UNC80.

==== Protein Complex ====
NALCN complexes with the proteins UNC79, UNC80, and FAM155A. UNC79 appears to be linked to membrane stability of NALCN and linkage with UNC 80. UNC80 mediates chemical modulation of NALCN through multiple pathways. FAM155A helps protein folding in the endoplasmic reticulum, chaperones transport to the axon, and contributes to membrane stability.

=== Biological function ===
The resting membrane potential of a neuron is usually -60mV to -80mV, driven primarily by the K^{+} potential at -90mV. The depolarization from the K^{+} potential is due primarily to a small Na^{+} leak current. About 70% of this current is through NALCN. Increasing NALCN permeability lowers the resting membrane potential, bringing it closer to the trigger of an action potential (-55mV), thus increasing the excitability of a neuron.

=== Role in pathology ===
Mutations to NALCN lead to severe disruptions to respiratory rhythm in mice and altered circadian locomotion in flies. Mutations to NALCN have also been linked to multiple severe developmental disorders and cervical dystonia. Schizophrenia and bipolar disorder are also linked to mutations to NALCN.

== pH modulation ==
Changes in blood and tissue pH accompany physiological and pathophysiological conditions such as exercise, cardiac ischemia, ischemic stroke, and cocaine ingestion. These conditions are known to trigger the symptoms of electrical diseases in patients carrying sodium channel mutations. Protons cause a diverse set of changes to sodium channel gating, which generally lead to decreases in the amplitude of the transient sodium current and increases in the fraction of non-inactivating channels that pass persistent currents. These effects are shared with disease-causing mutants in neuronal, skeletal muscle, and cardiac tissue. And they may be compounded in mutants that impart greater proton sensitivity to sodium channels, suggesting a role of protons in triggering acute symptoms of electrical disease.

=== Molecular mechanisms of proton block ===
Single channel data from cardiomyocytes have shown that protons can decrease the conductance of individual sodium channels. The sodium channel selectivity filter is composed of a single residue in each of the four pore-loops of the four functional domains. These four residues are known as the DEKA motif. The permeation rate of sodium through the sodium channel is determined by a four carboxylate residues, the EEDD motif, which make up the outer charged ring. The protonation of these carboxylates is one of the main drivers of proton block in sodium channels, although there are other residues that also contribute to pH sensitivity. One such residue is C373 in the cardiac sodium channel which makes it the most pH-sensitive sodium channel among the sodium channels that have been studied to date.

=== pH modulation of sodium channel gating ===
As the cardiac sodium channel is the most pH-sensitive sodium channel, most of what is known is based on this channel. Reduction in extracellular pH has been shown to depolarize the voltage-dependence of activation and inactivation to more positive potentials. This indicates that during activities that decrease the blood pH, such as exercising, the probability of channels activating and inactivating is higher more positive membrane potentials, which can lead to potential adverse effects. The sodium channels expressed in skeletal muscle fibers have evolved into relatively pH-insensitive channels. This has been suggested to be a protective mechanism against potential over- or under-excitability in skeletal muscles, as blood pH levels are highly susceptible to change during movement. Recently, a mixed syndrome mutation that causes periodic paralysis and myotonia in the skeletal sodium channel has been shown to impart pH-sensitivity in this channel, making the gating of this channel similar to that of the cardiac subtype.

=== pH modulation across the subtypes studied thus far ===
The effects of protonation have been characterized in Na_{v}1.1–Na_{v}1.5. Among these channels, Na_{v}1.1–Na_{v}1.3 and Na_{v}1.5 display depolarized voltage-dependence of activation, while activation in Na_{v}1.4 remains insensitive to acidosis. The voltage-dependence of steady-state fast inactivation is unchanged in Na_{v}1.1–Na_{v}1.4, but steady-state fast inactivation in Na_{v}1.5 is depolarized. Hence, among the sodium channels that have been studied so far, Na_{v}1.4 is the least and Na_{v}1.5 is the most proton-sensitive subtypes.

== See also ==
- Calcium channel – Ion channel complex through which calcium ions pass
- Chronaxie – Electrophysiology metric
- Epithelial sodium channel – Group of membrane proteins
- Ion channel – Pore-forming membrane protein
- Resting ion channel – Class of transport proteins
- Sodium in biology
