= Signal-averaged electrocardiogram =

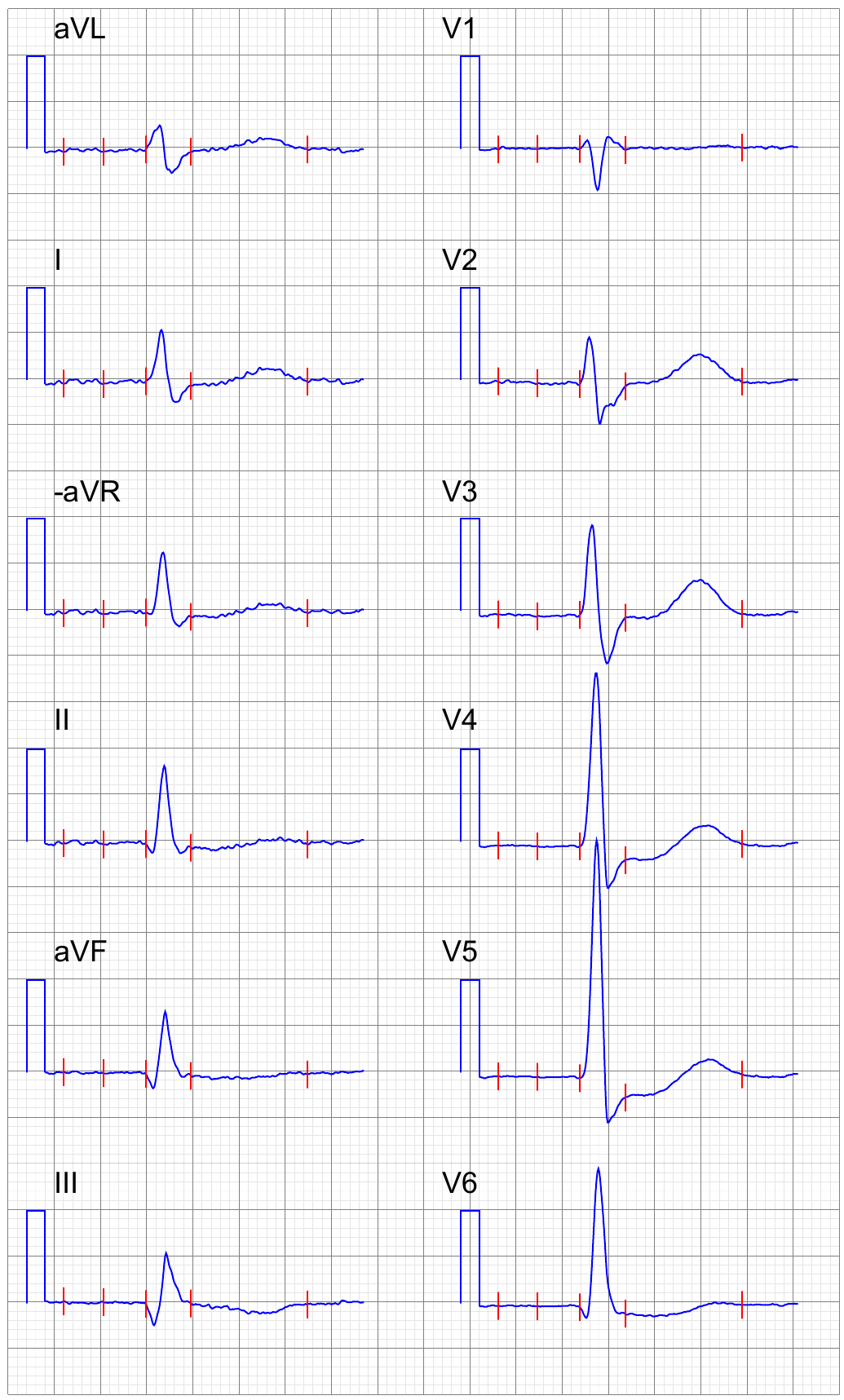
- Signal-averaged electrocardiogram from a 77-year-old male taking digoxin for atrial fibrillation.
- Purpose: to reveal small variations (ventricular late potentials (VLPs)) in the QRS complex

Signal-averaged electrocardiography (SAECG) is a special electrocardiographic technique, in which multiple electric signals from the heart are averaged to remove interference and reveal small variations in the QRS complex, usually the so-called "late potentials". These may represent a predisposition towards potentially dangerous ventricular tachyarrhythmias.

== Technique ==
=== Procedure ===
A resting electrocardiogram (ECG) is recorded in the supine position using an ECG machine equipped with SAECG software; this can be done by a physician, nurse, or medical technician. Unlike standard basal ECG recording, which requires only a few seconds, SAECG recording requires a few minutes (usually about 7-10 minutes), as the machine must record multiple subsequent QRS potentials to remove interference due to skeletal muscle and to obtain a statistically significant average trace. For this reason, it is important for the patient to lie as still as possible during the recording.

=== Results ===
SAECG recording yields a single, averaged QRS potential, usually printed in a much larger scale than standard ECGs, upon which the SAECG software performs calculations to reveal small variations (typically 1-25 uV) in the final portion of the QRS complex (the so-called "late potentials, or more accurately, "late ventricular potentials"). These can be immediately interpreted by comparing results with cut-off values.

== Significance ==
Late potentials are taken to represent delayed and fragmented depolarisation of the ventricular myocardium, which may be the substrate for a micro-re-entry mechanism, implying a higher risk of potentially dangerous ventricular tachyarrhythmias. This has been used for the risk stratification of sudden cardiac death in people who have had a myocardial infarction, as well as in people with known coronary heart disease, cardiomyopathies, or unexplained syncope. Still, the real predictive value of these findings is questioned. Late potentials may be found in 0-10% of normal volunteers. When used as a prognostic factor for the development of ventricular tachycardia, they have a sensitivity of 72% and a specificity of 75%, yielding a positive predictive value of 20% and a negative predictive value of 20%.
