= SCN7A =

Protein-coding gene in the species Homo sapiens

Identifiers
- Aliases: SCN7A, NaG, Nav2.1, Nav2.2, SCN6A, sodium voltage-gated channel alpha subunit 7
- External IDs: OMIM: 182392; MGI: 102965; GeneCards: SCN7A

Gene location (Human)
Chr.	Chromosome 2 (human)
Band	2q24.3	Start	166,403,573 bp
Band	2q24.3	End	166,611,482 bp

Gene location (Mouse)
Chr.	Chromosome 2 (mouse)
Band	2 C1.3|2 39.21 cM	Start	66,503,769 bp
Band	2 C1.3|2 39.21 cM	End	66,615,258 bp
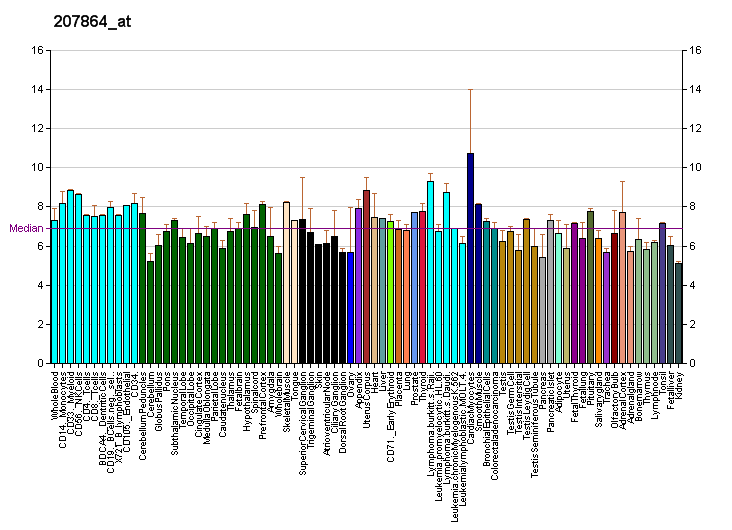
RNA expression pattern
Bgee	Human / Mouse (ortholog); Top expressed in: trigeminal ganglion; sural nerve; right lung; spinal ganglia; lower lobe of lung; seminal vesicula; right ventricle; left ovary; visceral pleura; muscle layer of sigmoid colon / Top expressed in: left lung lobe; carotid body; median eminence; lumbar spinal ganglion; right lung; right lung lobe; white adipose tissue; trigeminal ganglion; arcuate nucleus; aortic valve; More reference expression data
BioGPS	More reference expression data
Gene ontology
Molecular function	ion channel activity; sodium channel activity; voltage-gated ion channel activity; voltage-gated sodium channel activity
Cellular component	voltage-gated sodium channel complex; integral component of membrane; plasma membrane; membrane; axon; glial cell projection
Biological process	regulation of ion transmembrane transport; muscle contraction; membrane depolarization during action potential; ion transport; sodium ion transmembrane transport; transmembrane transport; neuronal action potential; sodium ion transport; ion transmembrane transport; response to bacterium; sodium ion homeostasis
Sources:Amigo / QuickGO
Orthologs
Databases	NCBI: entry; OMA: entry
Species	Human	Mouse
Entrez	6332	20272
Ensembl	ENSG00000136546	ENSMUSG00000034810
UniProt	Q01118	n/a
RefSeq (mRNA)	NM_002976	NM_009135
RefSeq (protein)	NP_002967	n/a
Location (UCSC)	Chr 2: 166.4 – 166.61 Mb	Chr 2: 66.5 – 66.62 Mb
PubMed search
- Wikidata
View/Edit Human	View/Edit Mouse

Na_{x} is a protein that in humans is encoded by the SCN7A (Sodium channel protein type 7) gene. It is a sodium channel alpha subunit expressed in the heart, the uterus and in glial cells of mice. It has low similarity to all nine other sodium channel alpha subunits (Na_{v}1.1–1.9).

== Function ==
Scientists have so far been unable to create a voltage-gated channel out of SCN7A. There are two theories to its purpose: sodium sensor (confirmed in rats, not reproducible in human cells), and ion channel (proposed for humans).

=== Sodium sensor ===
Mouse Scn7a can be activated by changes in the extracellular concentration of sodium [~150 mM]. In this role it seems to be completely insensitive to tetrodotoxin, unlike its nine conventional VGNCs cousins.

Compared to normal mice, Scn7a knockout mice:

- Do not prefer water containing less sodium during dehydration.
- Do not have blood pressure increases following salt intake. Na_{x} are found on mouse sympathetic neurons and might be essential for this response.
- Show less regrowth of peripheral nerves after damage. It's unclear whether this process has anything to do with the putative sodium-sensor role.
- Heal wounds slower. Scn7a has previously been shown to play a role in maintaining the sodium concentration in epithelial cells. Mice with a temporary knockdown via DSIRNA also show delayed healing.

Despite all the evidence pointing to Scn7a acting as a sodium sensor in rodents, there is no data for humans, not even in cell cultures. Conditions that confirm the sodium-sensing abilities of mouse Scn7a do not reliably work on human SCN7A.

=== Putative ion channel ===
The cyro-EM structure shows that human SCN7A is normally stuck in a nonconductive state, with several membrane lipid molecules blocking the pore. When three polar "QTT" mutations were added to drive the lipids away from SCN7A, one obtains a leakage channel that is always active. SCN7A-QTT does not discriminate among monovalent cations, is inhibited by extracellular calcium, and is sensitive to tetrodotoxin and other classical sodium channel blockers. This result suggests that SCN7A could actually function as an ion channel, assuming there is a way to displace the lipid molecules in vivo – this type of "hydrophobic gating" is not unheard of in other channels.

== Evolution ==
Na_{x} is only found in eutherian mammals. It arose by a duplication of the gene SCN9A and quickly deviated from the canonical Na_{v}1 functions by losing key conserved residues in domains III, IV, and the loop in between. As eutherians diverged, Na_{x} showed exceptionally high evolutionary rates across all lineages.

Na_{x} must not be confused with "Na_{v}2" of invertebrates. This other "Na_{v}2" is a true voltage-gated channel in these animals and carry the ancestral "D/E/E/A" ion recognition sequence.

== See also ==
- Sodium channel
