= FGF12 =

Protein-coding gene in the species Homo sapiens

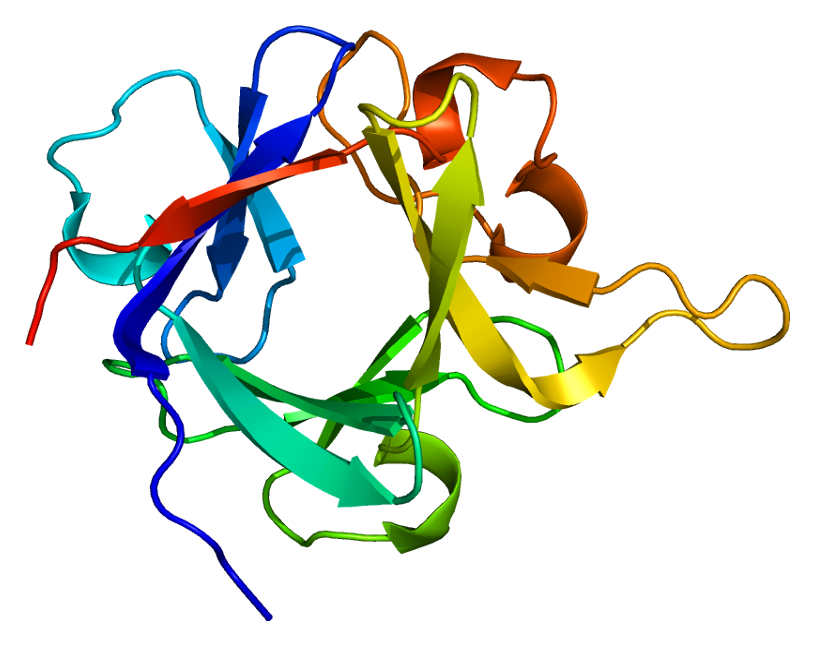

Identifiers
- Aliases: FGF12, FGF12B, FHF1, fibroblast growth factor 12, EIEE47, DEE47
- External IDs: OMIM: 601513; MGI: 109183; GeneCards: FGF12
Available structures
PDB	Ortholog search: PDBe RCSB
PDB	List of PDB id codes 1Q1U, 4JQ0

Gene location (Human)
Chr.	Chromosome 3 (human)
Band	3q28-q29	Start	192,139,390 bp
Band	3q28-q29	End	192,767,764 bp

Gene location (Mouse)
Chr.	Chromosome 16 (mouse)
Band	16 B2|16 19.38 cM	Start	27,978,850 bp
Band	16 B2|16 19.38 cM	End	28,571,820 bp
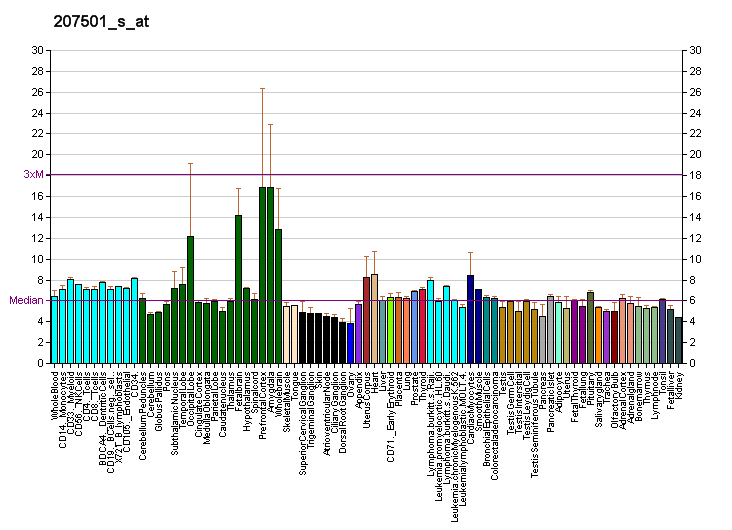

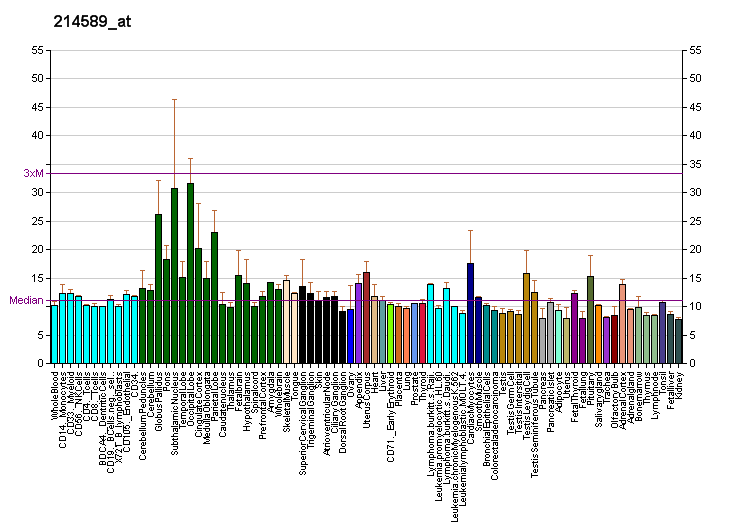
RNA expression pattern
Bgee	Human / Mouse (ortholog); Top expressed in: right auricle of heart; cardiac muscle tissue of right atrium; apex of heart; pons; myocardium of left ventricle; right ventricle; right adrenal cortex; left adrenal cortex; middle temporal gyrus; prefrontal cortex / Top expressed in: superior frontal gyrus; medial dorsal nucleus; facial motor nucleus; dentate gyrus of hippocampal formation granule cell; medial geniculate nucleus; pontine nuclei; anterior horn of spinal cord; lateral septal nucleus; lateral geniculate nucleus; medial vestibular nucleus; More reference expression data
BioGPS	More reference expression data
Gene ontology
Molecular function	sodium channel regulator activity; heparin binding; transmembrane transporter binding; fibroblast growth factor receptor binding; protein binding; growth factor activity
Cellular component	nucleus; intracellular anatomical structure; extracellular space
Biological process	negative regulation of cation channel activity; adult locomotory behavior; cell-cell signaling; cardiac muscle cell action potential involved in contraction; regulation of membrane depolarization; nervous system development; fibroblast growth factor receptor signaling pathway; JNK cascade; development of the heart; neuromuscular process; regulation of sodium ion transmembrane transporter activity; positive regulation of sodium ion transport; regulation of sodium ion transmembrane transport; signal transduction; chemical synaptic transmission; regulation of voltage-gated sodium channel activity; regulation of neuronal action potential; regulation of signaling receptor activity
Sources:Amigo / QuickGO
Orthologs
Databases	NCBI: entry; OMA: entry
Species	Human	Mouse
Entrez	2257	14167
Ensembl	ENSG00000114279	ENSMUSG00000022523
UniProt	P61328	P61329
RefSeq (mRNA)	NM_004113; NM_021032; NM_001377292; NM_001377293; NM_001377294	NM_001276419; NM_001276420; NM_010199; NM_183064; NM_001357064
RefSeq (protein)	NP_004104; NP_066360; NP_001364221; NP_001364222; NP_001364223	NP_001263348; NP_001263349; NP_034329; NP_898887; NP_001343993
Location (UCSC)	Chr 3: 192.14 – 192.77 Mb	Chr 16: 27.98 – 28.57 Mb
PubMed search
- Wikidata
View/Edit Human	View/Edit Mouse

Fibroblast growth factor 12 is a protein that in humans is encoded by the FGF12 gene.

The protein encoded by this gene is a member of the fibroblast growth factor (FGF) family. FGF family members possess broad mitogenic and cell survival activities, and are involved in a variety of biological processes, including embryonic development, cell growth, morphogenesis, tissue repair, tumor growth, and invasion. This growth factor lacks the N-terminal signal sequence present in most of the FGF family members, but it contains clusters of basic residues that have been demonstrated to act as a nuclear localization signal. When transfected into mammalian cells, this protein accumulated in the nucleus, but was not secreted. The specific function of this gene has not yet been determined. Two alternatively spliced transcript variants encoding distinct isoforms have been reported.
