= Paroxysmal extreme pain disorder =

Rare disorder of abnormal pain sensation

- Other names: PEPD

Paroxysmal extreme pain disorder originally named familial rectal pain syndrome, is a rare disorder whose most notable features are pain in the mandibular, ocular and rectal areas as well as flushing. PEPD often first manifests at the beginning of life, perhaps even in utero, with symptoms persisting throughout life. PEPD symptoms are reminiscent of primary erythromelalgia, as both result in flushing and episodic pain, though pain is typically present in the extremities for primary erythromelalgia. Both of these disorders have recently been shown to be allelic, both caused by mutations in the voltage-gated sodium channel Na_{V}1.7 encoded by the gene SCN9A. A different mutation in the SCN9A ion channel causes congenital insensitivity to pain.

== Symptoms and signs ==
The most distinctive feature of PEPD is episodic burning pain of the rectum, ocular, and mandibular regions. It should be stressed that while pain often originates or is centered in these areas, it can also spread or be diffuse in nature. Pain experienced by patients with this disorder should not be underestimated, as women with the disorder who have also given birth describe PEPD pain as worse than labor pain. Concomitant with this pain is typically flushing, often in an area associated with the pain.

During attacks in infants, the child often looks startled or terrified and can scream inconsolably. These attacks can be precipitated by injections, defecation, wiping of the perineum, eating, or the consumption of oral medication. When attacks occur due to such precipitation, pain and flushing are often present in the area of attack precipitation, though symptoms may also be diffuse in nature.

Other symptoms may include hypersalivation when attacks are localized in the mandibular region or leg weakness after foot trauma. A prominent non-physical symptom is tonic non-epileptic seizures. Such seizures are more common in infancy and childhood than during adulthood. In older children, inconsolable screaming usually precedes such an attack, followed by apnea, paleness, and stiffness. Such stiffness can last from seconds to a few minutes.

Attack precipitants are usually physical in nature, such as defecation, eating, or taking medicine. Some less common precipitants are micturition, coitus, and painful stimuli. There are also non-physical precipitants, such as the thought or sight of food. In general, attacks tend to occur in the precipitated area, though this is not always the case. While some individuals have described a build-up to attacks, they generally tend to be abrupt. The duration of these attacks can be from a few seconds to two hours.

Patients are largely normal between attacks. The only notable problem is constipation, likely due to apprehension of precipitating an attack. This symptom often decreases with age, likely due to coping mechanisms such as the use of stool softeners.

== Cause ==
The voltage-gated sodium channel Na_{V}1.7 is expressed in nociceptive and sympathetic neurons, where it aids in action potential creation and regulation. The mutations in this gene that have been study all alter the channel's ability to inactivate. Sodium channel inactivation is vital for the proper cessation of action potentials. The decrease in inactivation caused by these mutations, then, is expected to cause prolonged action potentials and repetitive firing. Such altered firing will cause increased pain sensation and increased sympathetic nervous system activity, producing the phenotype observed in patients with PEPD.

== Pathophysiology ==
There are a total of 8 mutations that account for the disorder in 8 of 14 studied families. These mutations are clustered in four regions throughout the channel: the linker between domains 2 and 3 (D2-3), the intracellular segment linking segments 4 and 5 in domain 3 (D3S4-5), the linker between domains 3 and 4 (D3-4) and the intracellular segment linking segments 4 and 5 in domain 4 (D4S4-5). The mutations in the D3S4-5 region (I1461T, F1462V and T1461I) are located in or next to an IFM motif that is conserved across all voltage-gated sodium channels. Mutagenesis studies of this region have shown that it acts as part of the inactivation gate, pivoting to block the central pore. Not surprisingly then, the two of these mutations that have received further study show incomplete inactivation. When the IFM motif pivots to block the central pore it interacts with residues in the D3S4-5 region. There are three mutations in this region (V1298F, F1298D and V1299F) that are believed to alter the interaction with the inactivation gate. While this region has been studied by mutagenesis these specific mutations have not all received attention, though they are expected to produce changes similar to the aforementioned IFM region mutations. The M1627K mutation in the D4S4-5 region may also affect a residue involved in interacting with the IFM inactivation motif. This would explain the observed alteration of inactivation and the broadening of a window current. One of the affected families with the R996C mutation, pedigree 12, has a single individual who also has the V1298D mutation. The individual in this family with the compound mutation is the most severely affected, suggesting that the R996C mutation may cause a less severe phenotype. The less severe phenotype of the pedigree 4 family is in concordance with this theory. It is unclear how the R996C mutation affects channel function.

Summary of mutations found in patients diagnosed with PEPD
Mutation	Region	Persistent Current?	Physiological Effect	Affected Families by Location
R996C	D2-3			4 (UK), 12 (France)
V1298F	D3S4-5			15 (UK)
V1298D	D3S4-5			12 (France)
V1299F	D3S4-5			11 (UK)
I1461T	D3-4	Yes	Incomplete inactivation due to depolarizing shift of steady-state inactivation curve.	1 (UK)
F1462V	D3S4-5			9 (UK)
T1464I	D3S4-5	Yes	Incomplete inactivation due to depolarizing shift of steady-state inactivation curve.	7 (UK)
M1627K	D4S4-5	Yes	Creation of a notable "window current" due to shifting of the inactivation curve.	8 (France)
Data from Fertleman 2006 and Fertleman 2007

== Diagnosis ==
Hematological, biochemical, and metabolic investigations on blood and urine between attacks are normal, as are karyotyping and EKG recordings. EKG recordings during attacks show sinus tachycardia. CT, MRI, EMG, and nerve conduction studies produce normal results. EEG recordings are normal between attacks but show early-onset tachycardia during attacks. On the Neuropathic Pain Questionnaire, patients indicated that pain during attacks is extremely unpleasant and typically felt deep, though also superficial on occasion. Aside from presentation of typical symptoms, mutation of the gene SCN9A aids in appropriate diagnosis, as this gene is mutated in 8 of 14 studied families.

== Treatment ==
Carbamazepine is at least partly effective at reducing the number or severity of attacks in most PEPD patients. High doses of this drug may be required, perhaps explaining the lack of effect in some individuals. While other epilepsy drugs like gabapentin and topiramate have limited effect in some patients, they have not been shown to be generally effective. Opiate-derived analgesics are also largely ineffective, with only sporadic cases of beneficial effect.

== Epidemiology ==
PEPD is an extremely rare disorder with only 15 known affected families. There are some cases, however, of individuals originally diagnosed with epilepsy who are later determined to have PEPD. This suggests that rates of PEPD may be higher than currently believed.

== History ==
PEPD was originally described by Hayden and Grossman in 1959. At that time it was not given a specific name. A later report by Dugan in 1972,

labeled this disorder as familial rectal pain syndrome. This name was used for 33 years, until a consortium of patients and clinicians was formed in the hopes of discovering the genetic cause of PEPD. During this process, a number of patients expressed dissatisfaction with the name and after considerable discussion between patients and clinicians, the name paroxysmal extreme pain disorder was agreed upon in 2005.
