= SCN1B =

Protein-coding gene in the species Homo sapiens

Identifiers
- Aliases: SCN1B, ATFB13, BRGDA5, GEFSP1, sodium voltage-gated channel beta subunit 1, EIEE52, DEE52
- External IDs: OMIM: 600235; MGI: 98247; GeneCards: SCN1B

Gene location (Human)
Chr.	Chromosome 19 (human)
Band	19q13.11	Start	35,030,470 bp
Band	19q13.11	End	35,040,449 bp

Gene location (Mouse)
Chr.	Chromosome 7 (mouse)
Band	7 B1|7 19.3 cM	Start	30,815,949 bp
Band	7 B1|7 19.3 cM	End	30,826,428 bp
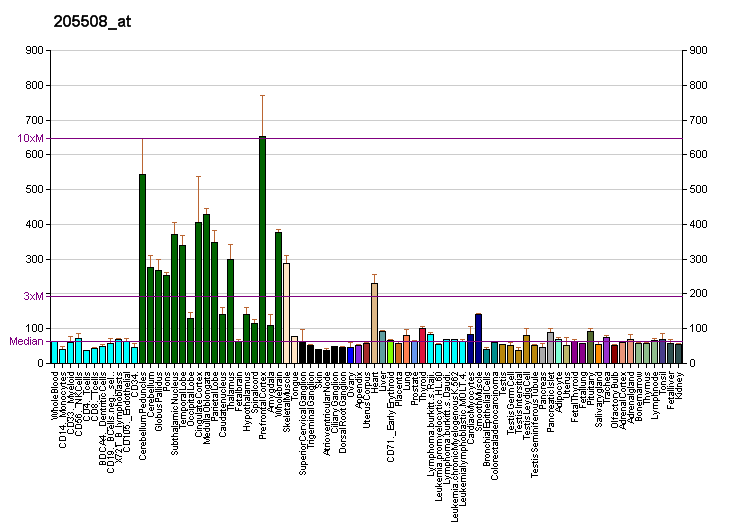
RNA expression pattern
Bgee	Human / Mouse (ortholog); Top expressed in: primary visual cortex; right hemisphere of cerebellum; gastrocnemius muscle; right frontal lobe; muscle of thigh; skeletal muscle tissue; dorsolateral prefrontal cortex; Brodmann area 9; superior frontal gyrus; prefrontal cortex / Top expressed in: superior frontal gyrus; primary visual cortex; muscle of thigh; dentate gyrus of hippocampal formation granule cell; cerebellar cortex; extensor digitorum longus muscle; CA3 field; perirhinal cortex; triceps brachii muscle; temporal muscle; More reference expression data
BioGPS	More reference expression data
Gene ontology
Molecular function	sodium channel activity; voltage-gated ion channel activity; voltage-gated sodium channel activity involved in Purkinje myocyte action potential; voltage-gated sodium channel activity involved in cardiac muscle cell action potential; voltage-gated sodium channel activity; sodium channel regulator activity; sodium channel inhibitor activity; protein binding; transmembrane transporter binding
Cellular component	integral component of membrane; membrane; sodium channel complex; extracellular region; voltage-gated sodium channel complex; node of Ranvier; intercalated disc; T-tubule; plasma membrane
Biological process	membrane depolarization during Purkinje myocyte cell action potential; cardiac muscle contraction; regulation of sodium ion transport; sodium ion transport; regulation of atrial cardiac muscle cell membrane depolarization; membrane depolarization; regulation of ion transmembrane transport; cardiac muscle cell action potential involved in contraction; ion transport; cell adhesion; regulation of sodium ion transmembrane transporter activity; positive regulation of sodium ion transport; response to pyrethroid; regulation of heart rate by cardiac conduction; chemical synaptic transmission; corticospinal neuron axon guidance; neuronal action potential propagation; axon guidance; cardiac conduction; regulation of ventricular cardiac muscle cell membrane repolarization; sodium ion transmembrane transport; locomotion; positive regulation of neuron projection development; membrane depolarization during cardiac muscle cell action potential
Sources:Amigo / QuickGO
Orthologs
Databases	NCBI: entry; OMA: entry
Species	Human	Mouse
Entrez	6324	20266
Ensembl	ENSG00000105711	ENSMUSG00000019194
UniProt	Q07699	P97952
RefSeq (mRNA)	NM_001037; NM_199037; NM_001321605	NM_011322
RefSeq (protein)	NP_001028; NP_001308534; NP_950238	NP_035452; NP_001389263
Location (UCSC)	Chr 19: 35.03 – 35.04 Mb	Chr 7: 30.82 – 30.83 Mb
PubMed search
- Wikidata
View/Edit Human	View/Edit Mouse

Sodium channel subunit beta-1 is a protein that in humans is encoded by the SCN1B gene.

Voltage-gated sodium channels are essential for the generation and propagation of action potentials in striated muscle and neuronal tissues. Biochemically, they consist of a large alpha subunit and 1 or 2 smaller beta subunits, such as SCN1B. The alpha subunit alone can exhibit all the functional attributes of a voltage-gated Na+ channel, but requires a beta-1 subunit for normal inactivation kinetics.[supplied by OMIM]

== Clinical significance ==
Mutation in the SCN1B gene are associated with disorders such as Brugada syndrome, Dravet Syndrome, and GEFS.

== See also ==
- Sodium channel
