= SCN4B =

Protein-coding gene in the species Homo sapiens

Identifiers
- Aliases: SCN4B, ATFB17, LQT10, Navbeta4, sodium voltage-gated channel beta subunit 4
- External IDs: OMIM: 608256; MGI: 2687406; GeneCards: SCN4B
Available structures
PDB	Ortholog search: PDBe RCSB
PDB	List of PDB id codes 4MZ2, 4MZ3

Gene location (Human)
Chr.	Chromosome 11 (human)
Band	11q23.3	Start	118,133,377 bp
Band	11q23.3	End	118,152,888 bp

Gene location (Mouse)
Chr.	Chromosome 9 (mouse)
Band	9|9 A5.2	Start	45,049,693 bp
Band	9|9 A5.2	End	45,065,450 bp
RNA expression pattern
Bgee	Human / Mouse (ortholog); Top expressed in: external globus pallidus; spinal ganglia; putamen; right hemisphere of cerebellum; pons; caudate nucleus; lateral nuclear group of thalamus; primary visual cortex; Brodmann area 23; trigeminal ganglion / Top expressed in: triceps brachii muscle; ankle; vastus lateralis muscle; sternocleidomastoid muscle; temporal muscle; knee joint; digastric muscle; extraocular muscle; medial head of gastrocnemius muscle; muscle of thigh; More reference expression data
BioGPS	n/a
Gene ontology
Molecular function	sodium channel regulator activity; transmembrane transporter binding; sodium channel activity; voltage-gated ion channel activity; voltage-gated sodium channel activity involved in cardiac muscle cell action potential; voltage-gated sodium channel activity
Cellular component	voltage-gated sodium channel complex; integral component of membrane; membrane; intercalated disc; intrinsic component of plasma membrane; plasma membrane
Biological process	cardiac muscle contraction; sodium ion transmembrane transport; sodium ion transport; regulation of ion transmembrane transport; cardiac muscle cell action potential involved in contraction; ion transport; regulation of sodium ion transmembrane transporter activity; positive regulation of sodium ion transport; AV node cell action potential; regulation of heart rate by cardiac conduction; membrane depolarization during cardiac muscle cell action potential; regulation of ventricular cardiac muscle cell membrane repolarization
Sources:Amigo / QuickGO
Orthologs
Databases	NCBI: entry; OMA: entry
Species	Human	Mouse
Entrez	6330	399548
Ensembl	ENSG00000177098	ENSMUSG00000046480
UniProt	Q8IWT1	Q7M729
RefSeq (mRNA)	NM_001142348; NM_001142349; NM_174934	NM_001013390
RefSeq (protein)	NP_001135820; NP_001135821; NP_777594	NP_001013408
Location (UCSC)	Chr 11: 118.13 – 118.15 Mb	Chr 9: 45.05 – 45.07 Mb
PubMed search
- Wikidata
View/Edit Human	View/Edit Mouse

Sodium channel β-subunit 4, also known as SCN4B or Naβ4, is an auxiliary sodium channel subunit that can alter the kinetics of sodium channels. The protein is encoded by the SCN4B gene. Mutations in the SCN4B are associated with long QT syndrome.

SCN4B might additionally function as a cell adhesion molecule.

== See also ==
- Sodium channel
