= Lev's disease =

- Other names: Lenègre–Lev syndrome Progressive Cardiac Conduction Defect (PCCD)
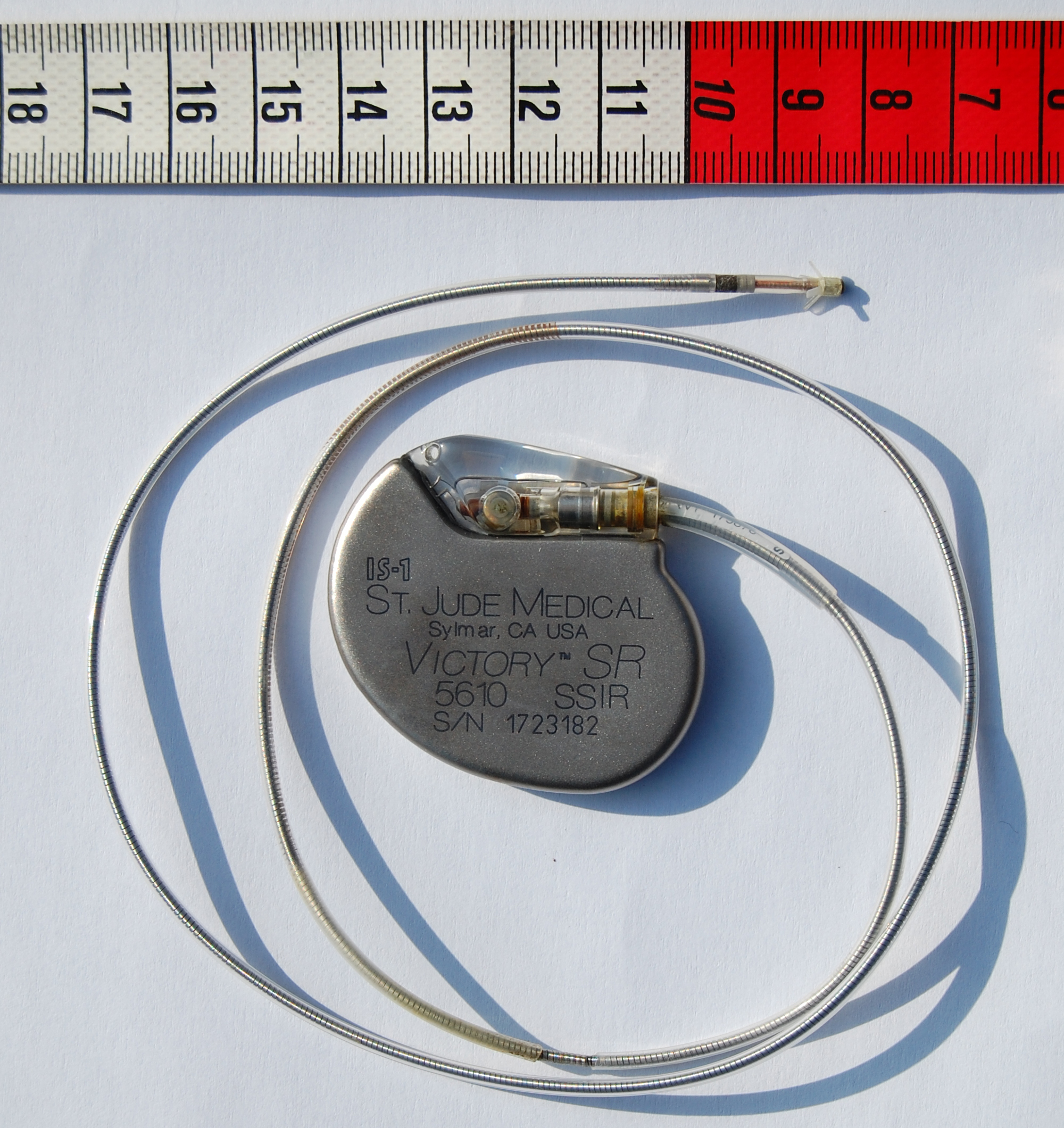
- Pacemaker used for treatment of Lev's disease
- Specialty: Cardiology

Lev's disease, also known as Lenègre disease, is an idiopathic disease that can result in a complete heart block, or an extremely slowed heart rate, in patients with this condition. It is thought that for certain patients, this impairment of heart's electrical conduction system is due to fibrosis and calcification of conduction cells. This disease is considered to be age related, with increasing decline seen in elderly patients.

The use of electrocardiograms, especially in non-specialized settings like emergency rooms, may incidentally reveal a dysrhythmia that can confuse diagnosis, however serial ECGs will demonstrate an evolving conduction block arrhythmia characteristic of Lev's disease, thus allowing for correct diagnosis.

== Presentation ==
=== Signs and symptoms ===
Lev's disease may present with various signs and symptoms; however, these may overlap with similar conditions such as atrioventricular (AV) blocks. Symptoms of Lev's disease may include syncope, shortness of breath, dizziness, heart failure, and sudden cardiac death. Symptoms may begin to appear as an adult. On the other hand, signs of Lev's disease may include bradycardia, defects in the cardiac conduction of the His-Purkinje system, widening of the QRS complex, and temporal potentially prolongation of the PR interval. However, individuals may also be asymptomatic, presenting with no symptoms. Thus, careful genetic screening and identification of patients with Lev's disease is important.

=== Associated conditions ===
Stokes–Adams attacks can be precipitated by this condition. These involve a temporary loss of consciousness resulting from marked slowing of the heart when the atrial impulse is no longer conducted to the ventricles. This should not be confused with the catastrophic loss of heartbeat seen with ventricular fibrillation or asystole.

Atrioventricular (AV) block may be a progression of Lev's disease, in which the electrical signal transmission from the heart's atria to the ventricles is impaired due to an extension of the fibrosis.

Bundle Branch Block (BBB) is another condition that can be precipitated by Lev's disease. This condition is the interrupted conduction of electrical impulses along the Bundle of His or one of the bundle branches. As the Bundle of His divides into the right and left bundle branches, a block of the electrical impulse may result in a Right Bundle Branch Block or a Left Bundle Branch Block, respectively.

Sinoatrial (SA) block may also result be a result of Lev's disease. During a SA block, the electrical impulse formed at the SA node is delayed or not conducted.

== History ==
In March 1954, researchers Richman and Wolff analyzed several patient cases using electrocardiograms and vectorcardiograms. In terms of the different cardiovascular diagnostic tests available, electrocardiograms are the most widely used between physicians. Many providers prefer the use of electrocardiograms since the process of interpreting vectorcardiograms are more complex and are more labor-intensive as it requires more electrode placement on patients. Electrocardiograms record and detect the electrical impulses generated by the heart. By doing so, medical professionals are able to analyze the electrical activity of the heart and detect any irregularities that may impact the function of the heart. However, vectorcardiogram diagnostic tests operate differently from electrocardiograms. This vectorcardiogram method analyzes the transverse, sagittal, and frontal planes to measure the electrical activity of the heart. This diagnostic test examines different factors such as rotations, contours, and the direction of the cardiac axis of the heart. Although the use of electrocardiograms are commonly used in clinical settings by many providers, vectorcardiograms are able to be more precise due to its ability to detect and identify the location of myocardial infarction, cardiac blockage, and hypertrophy. Among cases studied, patients exhibited a left bundle branch block that resembled a right bundle branch block. In comparison, however, although the electrocardiograms showed a right bundle branch block, the vectorcardiograms detected a left bundle branch block in the patient.

In March 1964, Jean Lenègre published a paper discussing the pathology behind the gradual damage and scarring of the ventricular conduction system.

In November 1964, Maurice Lev published a paper with similar findings as Lenègre where he saw the degenerative processes of the ventricular conduction system associated with calcification in older patient populations. Lev focused primarily on the anatomical process leading to atrioventricular blocks in patients and was able to build off the research conducted by Lenègre.

== Epidemiology ==
In a genetic epidemiological study published in 2012 focusing on western France, there were 6667 patients implanted with pacemakers for PCCD between the years of 1995 and 2005. The frequency of PCCD in different areas of western France was concluded to be 0.21% in a major city and up to 2.28% in specific parishes. Five large families were also identified to be affected by PCCD, contributing to the understanding that the disease has a genetic factor.

While there is limited data directly addressing Lev's disease and its prevalence, there are also some statistics on the associated diseases precipitated by Lev's disease.

One study published in 1998 followed 855 men born in 1913, and among the group the prevalence of bundle branch block was 17% when the study population was at age 80 years.

== Pathophysiology ==
Lev's disease operates similarly to other atrioventricular (AV) conduction disturbances. Unfortunately, the specific mechanisms of this condition are not yet fully clear. However, it is suspected that like other AV conduction disorders, Lev's disease can occur via two ways, acquired or congenital. Individuals with congenital Lev's disease typically come from pregnancies with lupus erythematosus complications or transfer of SSA/Ro and SSB/LA antibodies. In contrast, there are many theories on how Lev's disease may be acquired by a patient, however, there is strong evidence of fibrosis of the conduction system leading to impairments of the conduction system.

The heart is composed of two primary types of cell, contractile cells and specific cells that carry out conduction roles, including directing the actions of contractile cells. In the case of Lev's disease, calcification or fibrosis of these cells will impact their ability to work optimally, hindering the propagation of electrical currents through the heart. It has been seen that with age, the heart's autonomic movements begin to show rapid signs of decline, due to being governed by its ability to conduct signaling. Such issues occurring at the SA and AV nodes, will result in prorogation of ECG segments, because the pacemaker cells in these production centers are responsible for the rest of the signals traveling through the heart, and therefore the mechanical movements of cardiac muscle. In severe cases, like in Lev's disease, this can result in entire blockage of nodal electrical propagation.

== Diagnosis ==
Diagnosis of Lev's disease can be difficult due to the limited supporting literature. However, given that the disease shares similarities to conditions characterized by atrioventricular (AV) conduction blocks and bundle branch blocks, differential diagnostic approaches can involve considerations of related conditions.

Therefore, differential diagnoses can be conducted to help narrow down the list of possible diseases and help providers determine whether a patient may or may not have this condition. These approaches include using clinical evaluation to assess patient's past medical history for any symptoms such as chest pain, dizziness, fatigue, syncope, shortness of breath. Physical examinations are also conducted to determine whether a patient has signs of bradycardia. One of the most important exams that can be conducted to help determine atrioventricular (AV) conduction block and bundle branch block is an electrocardiogram. Electrocardiograms are used primarily to measure how efficiently the heart is working. The function of electrocardiograms is detection of electrical signals in the heart. These electrical signals are recorded on a graph to help detect heart rhythm and heart attacks.

== Prevention ==
Lev's disease remains an area of ongoing research and the specific underlying mechanisms of this disease state are not fully understood. As a result, effective prevention methods are currently limited.

Researchers do understand that Lev's disease can be presented in two primary forms: acquired and congenital. Individuals who have acquired Lev's disease presents signs and symptoms later in life and are often linked to the use of medication, medical conditions, surgical procedures, or environmental factors. In cases of congenital Lev's disease, it is present from birth and is commonly caused by genetic or developmental factors. Depending if the patient has acquired or congenital Lev's disease, the prevention strategies may differ and vary to address the needs associated with each form.

A preventive strategy can involve regular electrocardiogram tests, especially if the individual has a genetic family history of cardiac conditions such as Lev's disease. Additionally, the use of certain medications can impact the conduction of the heart. Studies have shown that medications such as Digoxin, beta blockers, calcium channel blockers, and anti-arrhythmic medications can slow down heart conduction in patients with pre-existing cardiac conditions. Since other cardiac conditions can be associated with Lev's disease, it is important to promote a heart healthy lifestyle. This includes adopting dietary and lifestyle changes that support and promote healthy heart health.

== Treatment and management ==
Lev's disease continues to be an active area of research. Currently, there is limited case reports, studies, and trials revolving around the treatment for Lev's Disease. There is no case study that gives a definitive treatment option. However, its treatment and management can be approached similarly to those for atrioventricular (AV) blocks. Both conditions involve the inability of the heart to properly conduct electrical signals; irregularity of heart beats and bradycardia. Treatment could involve implantation of a pacemaker to help restore and maintain a normal heart rhythm with ECG tests to ensure that the pacemaker is working properly.

== Case studies ==
=== Genetic testing ===
Over the years, many clinical studies have been conducted to give insight on the congenital acquirement of Lev's Disease, particularly to answer the question of if there is a genetic component that puts patients at a predisposed risk. A mouse model studied mice with a heterogenous mutation to their SCN5a gene, which impacts the formation of Na+ channels, leaving them with myocardial conditions similar to those with Lev's disease. The study used these mice to gain a further understanding into the progression of such abnormalities, and how it can be applied to the similar impacts of fibrosis and calcification in human myocardial systems. Their study results found that in mice with this heterozygous mutation, with age, exhibited extensive fibrosis of cardiac tissue in comparison to mice without the mutation.

== See also ==
- Heart block
