= SCN3B =

Protein-coding gene in the species Homo sapiens

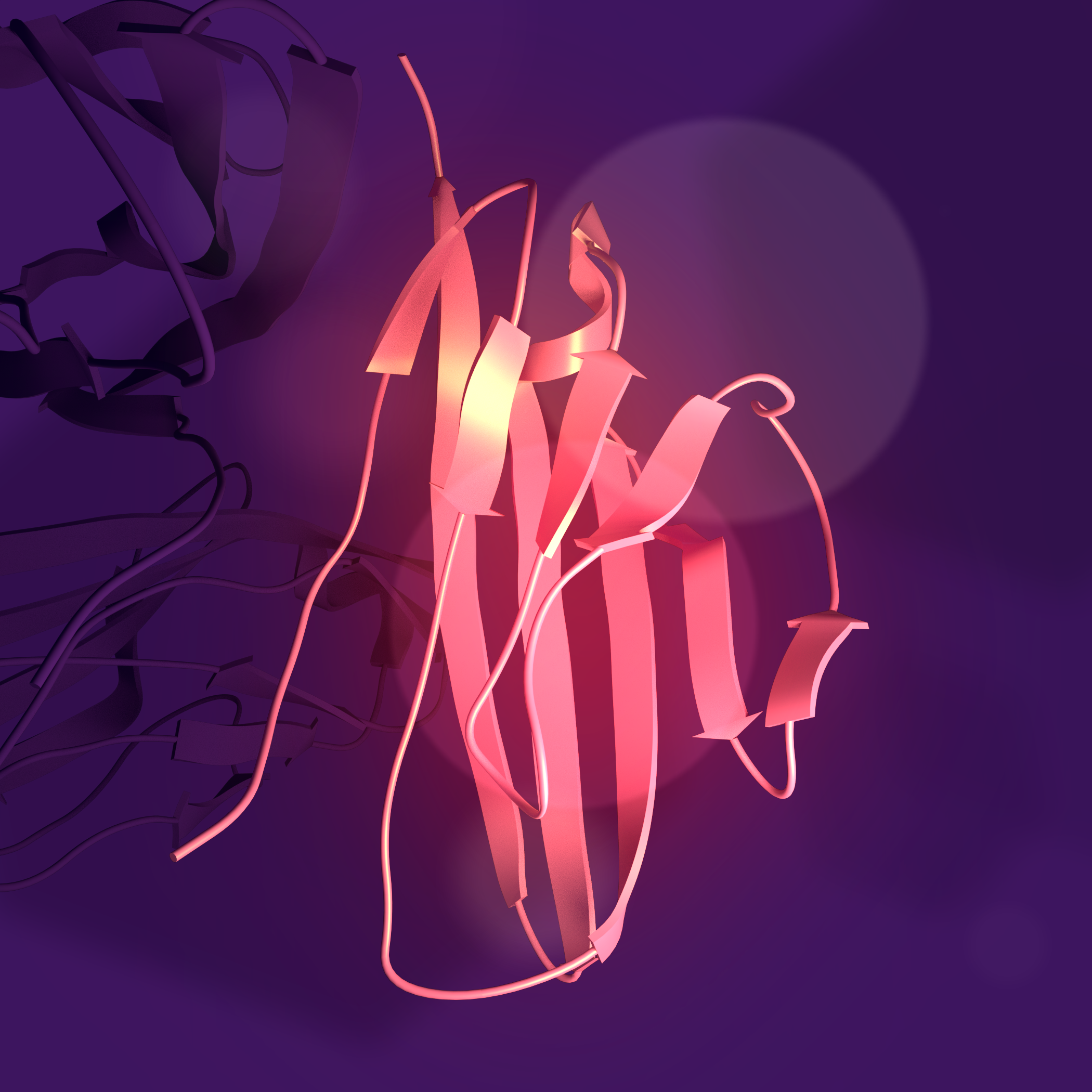

Identifiers
- Aliases: SCN3B, ATFB16, BRGDA7, HSA243396, SCNB3, sodium voltage-gated channel beta subunit 3
- External IDs: OMIM: 608214; MGI: 1918882; GeneCards: SCN3B
Available structures
PDB	Ortholog search: PDBe RCSB
PDB	List of PDB id codes 4L1D

Gene location (Human)
Chr.	Chromosome 11 (human)
Band	11q24.1	Start	123,629,187 bp
Band	11q24.1	End	123,655,244 bp

Gene location (Mouse)
Chr.	Chromosome 9 (mouse)
Band	9|9 A5.1	Start	40,180,513 bp
Band	9|9 A5.1	End	40,202,914 bp
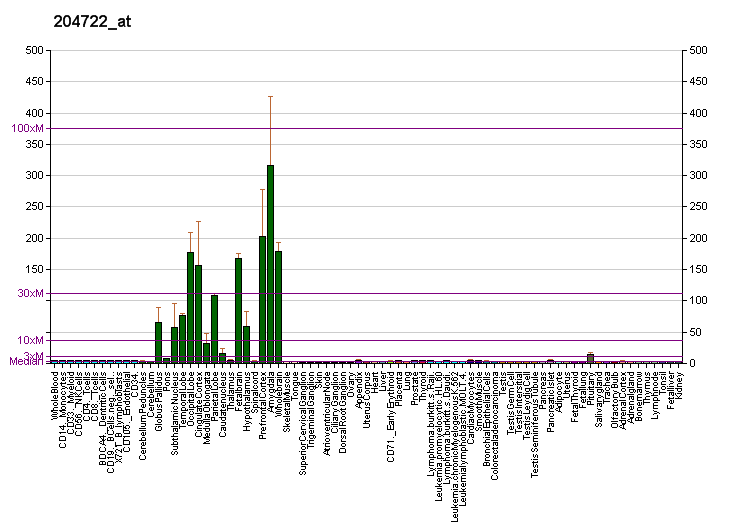

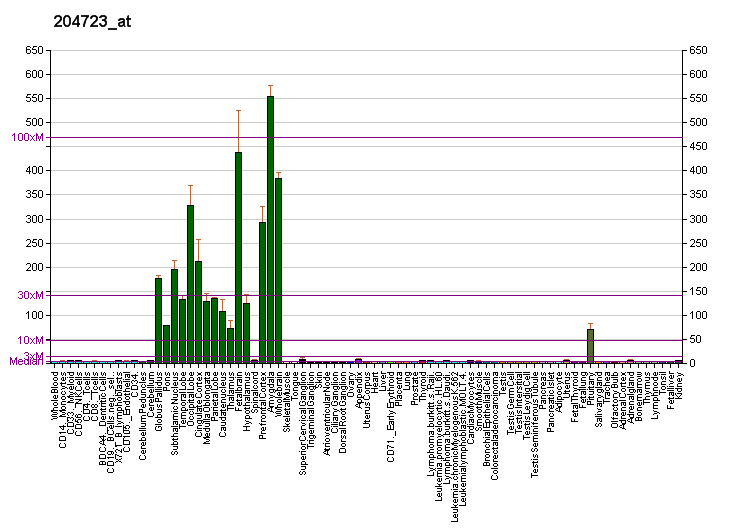
RNA expression pattern
Bgee	Human / Mouse (ortholog); Top expressed in: middle temporal gyrus; orbitofrontal cortex; Brodmann area 46; entorhinal cortex; superior frontal gyrus; Region I of hippocampus proper; prefrontal cortex; postcentral gyrus; dorsolateral prefrontal cortex; Brodmann area 23 / Top expressed in: superior cervical ganglion; Region I of hippocampus proper; olfactory epithelium; dentate gyrus; hippocampus proper; external carotid artery; dentate gyrus of hippocampal formation granule cell; nucleus accumbens; piriform cortex; ventral tegmental area; More reference expression data
BioGPS	More reference expression data
Gene ontology
Molecular function	sodium channel regulator activity; transmembrane transporter binding; sodium channel activity; voltage-gated ion channel activity; voltage-gated sodium channel activity involved in cardiac muscle cell action potential; voltage-gated sodium channel activity; sodium channel inhibitor activity
Cellular component	voltage-gated sodium channel complex; integral component of membrane; membrane; plasma membrane; Z discdkac
Biological process	regulation of ventricular cardiac muscle cell membrane depolarization; membrane depolarization during action potential; cardiac muscle contraction; sodium ion transmembrane transport; sodium ion transport; SA node cell action potential; regulation of atrial cardiac muscle cell membrane depolarization; membrane depolarization; ventricular cardiac muscle cell action potential; regulation of ion transmembrane transport; cardiac muscle cell action potential involved in contraction; ion transport; nervous system development; positive regulation of heart rate; cardiac conduction; regulation of sodium ion transmembrane transporter activity; atrial cardiac muscle cell action potential; positive regulation of sodium ion transport; sensory perception of pain; protein localization to plasma membrane; regulation of heart rate by cardiac conduction; membrane depolarization during cardiac muscle cell action potential
Sources:Amigo / QuickGO
Orthologs
Databases	NCBI: entry; OMA: entry
Species	Human	Mouse
Entrez	55800	235281
Ensembl	ENSG00000166257	ENSMUSG00000049281
UniProt	Q9NY72	Q8BHK2
RefSeq (mRNA)	NM_001040151; NM_018400	NM_001083917; NM_001286614; NM_153522; NM_178227; NM_001359700
RefSeq (protein)	NP_001035241; NP_060870	NP_001077386; NP_001273543; NP_839941; NP_001346629
Location (UCSC)	Chr 11: 123.63 – 123.66 Mb	Chr 9: 40.18 – 40.2 Mb
PubMed search
- Wikidata
View/Edit Human	View/Edit Mouse

Sodium channel subunit beta-3 is a protein that in humans is encoded by the SCN3B gene. Two alternatively spliced variants, encoding the same protein, have been identified.

== Function ==
Voltage-gated sodium channels are transmembrane glycoprotein complexes composed of a large alpha subunit and one or more regulatory beta subunits. They are responsible for the generation and propagation of action potentials in neurons and muscle. This gene encodes one member of the sodium channel beta subunit gene family, and influences the inactivation kinetics of the sodium channel.

== Clinical significance ==
Mutations in the gene are associated with abnormal cardiac electrophysiology.

== See also ==
- Sodium channel
