= SCN2B =

Protein-coding gene in the species Homo sapiens

Identifiers
- Aliases: SCN2B, ATFB14, sodium voltage-gated channel beta subunit 2
- External IDs: OMIM: 601327; MGI: 106921; GeneCards: SCN2B
Available structures
PDB	Ortholog search: PDBe RCSB
PDB	List of PDB id codes 5FEB, 5FDY

Gene location (Human)
Chr.	Chromosome 11 (human)
Band	11q23.3	Start	118,162,806 bp
Band	11q23.3	End	118,176,639 bp

Gene location (Mouse)
Chr.	Chromosome 9 (mouse)
Band	9 A5.2|9 24.84 cM	Start	45,029,080 bp
Band	9 A5.2|9 24.84 cM	End	45,041,368 bp
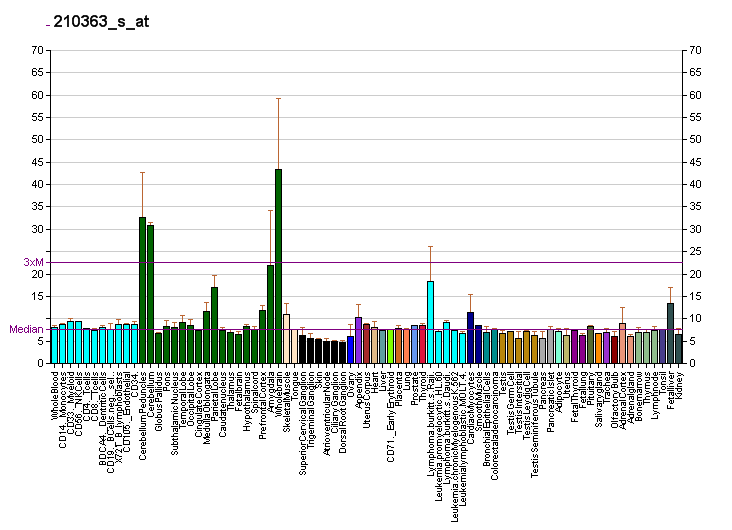

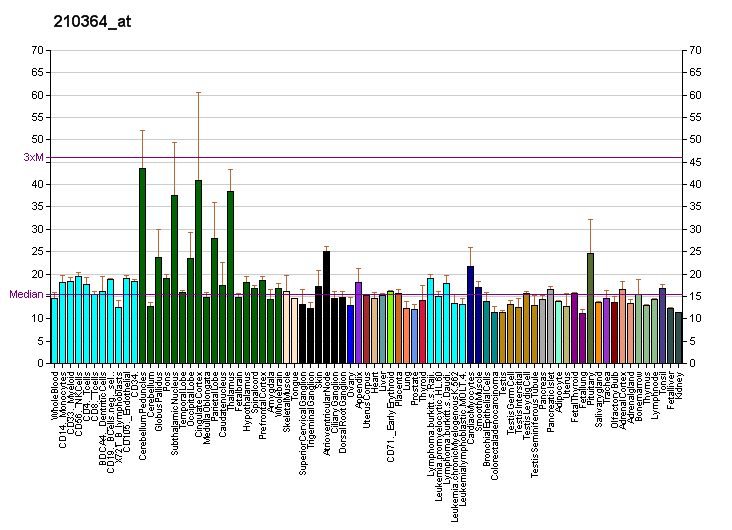
RNA expression pattern
Bgee	Human / Mouse (ortholog); Top expressed in: middle temporal gyrus; lateral nuclear group of thalamus; cerebellar cortex; cerebellar hemisphere; prefrontal cortex; right hemisphere of cerebellum; cerebellar vermis; superior frontal gyrus; primary visual cortex; right frontal lobe / Top expressed in: lobe of cerebellum; cerebellar vermis; lateral geniculate nucleus; olfactory tubercle; superior colliculus; medial geniculate nucleus; habenula; lateral septal nucleus; lateral hypothalamus; medial dorsal nucleus; More reference expression data
BioGPS	More reference expression data
Gene ontology
Molecular function	voltage-gated sodium channel activity involved in cardiac muscle cell action potential; sodium channel regulator activity; sodium channel activity; voltage-gated sodium channel activity; voltage-gated ion channel activity
Cellular component	integral component of membrane; voltage-gated sodium channel complex; membrane
Biological process	chemical synaptic transmission; nervous system development; cardiac muscle cell action potential involved in contraction; sodium ion transport; sodium ion transmembrane transport; regulation of sodium ion transmembrane transporter activity; cardiac muscle contraction; regulation of heart rate by cardiac conduction; regulation of atrial cardiac muscle cell membrane depolarization; membrane depolarization during cardiac muscle cell action potential; regulation of ion transmembrane transport; ion transport; response to pyrethroid
Sources:Amigo / QuickGO
Orthologs
Databases	NCBI: entry; OMA: entry
Species	Human	Mouse
Entrez	6327	72821
Ensembl	ENSG00000149575	ENSMUSG00000070304
UniProt	O60939	Q56A07
RefSeq (mRNA)	NM_004588	NM_001014761
RefSeq (protein)	NP_004579	NP_001014761
Location (UCSC)	Chr 11: 118.16 – 118.18 Mb	Chr 9: 45.03 – 45.04 Mb
PubMed search
- Wikidata
View/Edit Human	View/Edit Mouse

Sodium channel subunit beta-2 is a protein that in humans is encoded by the SCN2B gene.

== See also ==
- Sodium channel
