= SCN9A =

Protein-coding gene in the species Homo sapiens

Identifiers
- Aliases
- External IDs: GeneCards:
Orthologs
Databases	n/a
Species	Human	Mouse
Entrez	n/a	n/a
Ensembl	n/a	n/a
UniProt	n a	n/a
RefSeq (mRNA)	n/a	n/a
RefSeq (protein)	n/a	n/a
Location (UCSC)	n/a	n/a
PubMed search	n/a	n/a
- Wikidata
View/Edit Human

Sodium voltage-gated channel alpha subunit 9 (also Na_{v}1.7) is a sodium ion channel that, in humans, is encoded by the SCN9A gene. It is usually expressed at high levels in two types of neurons: the nociceptive (pain) neurons at the dorsal root ganglion (DRG) and trigeminal ganglion; and sympathetic ganglion neurons, which are part of the autonomic (involuntary) nervous system.

== Function ==
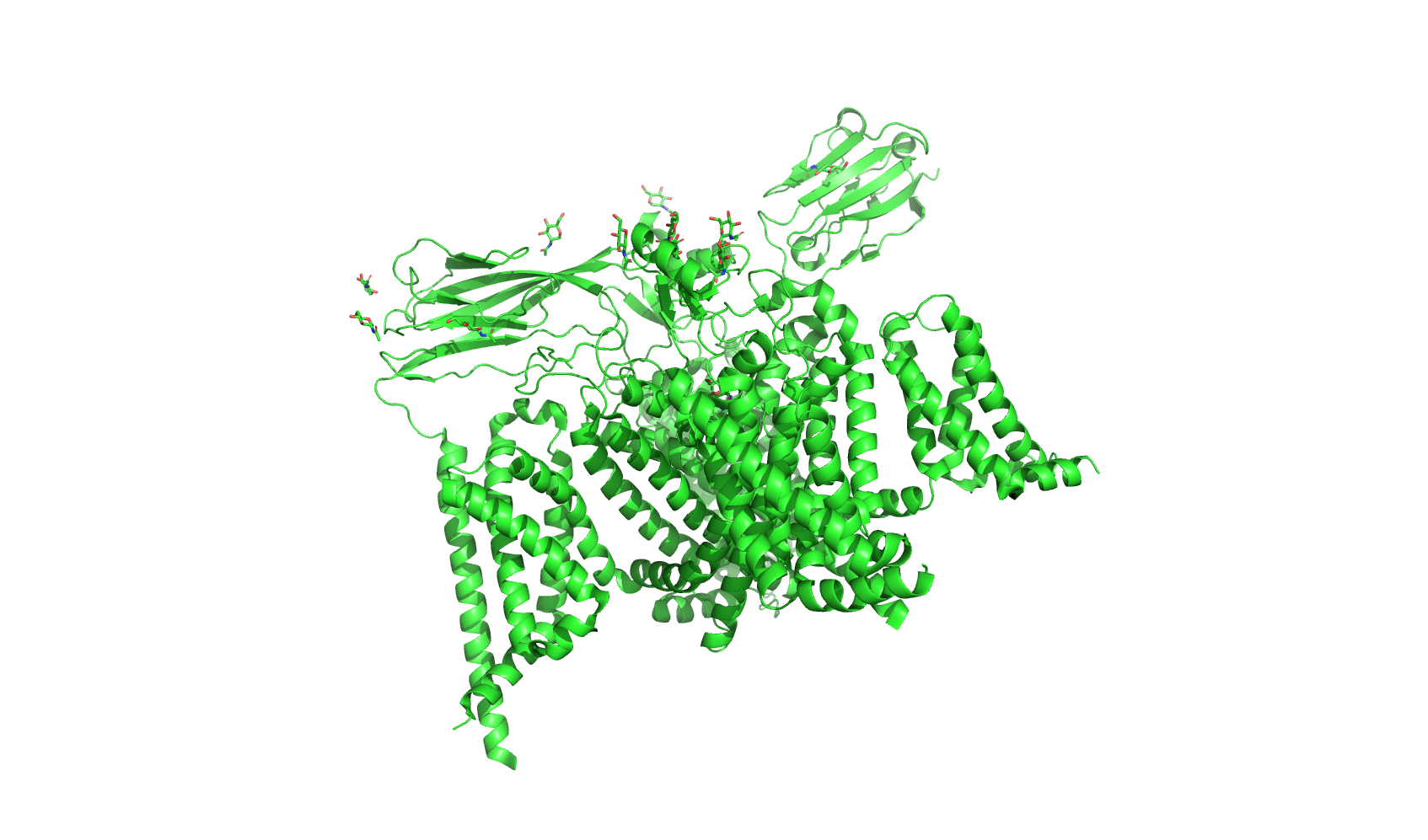
Structure of human voltage-gated sodium channel alpha subunit 9 in complex with auxiliary beta subunits, ProTx-II and tetrodotoxin (Y1755 down) from the RCSB PDB (6J8J).

Sodium voltage-gated channel alpha subunit 9 plays a critical role in the generation and conduction of action potentials and is thus important for electrical signaling by most excitable cells. Na_{v}1.7 is present at the endings of pain-sensing nerves, the nociceptors, close to the region where the impulse is initiated. Stimulation of the nociceptor nerve endings produces "generator potentials", which are small changes in the voltage across the neuronal membranes. The Na_{v}1.7 channel amplifies these membrane depolarizations, and when the membrane potential difference reaches a specific threshold, the neuron fires. In sensory neurons, multiple voltage-dependent sodium currents can be differentiated by their voltage dependence and by sensitivity to the voltage-gated sodium-channel blocker tetrodotoxin. The Na_{v}1.7 channel produces a rapidly activating and inactivating current which is sensitive to the level of tetrodotoxin. Na_{v}1.7 is important in the early phases of neuronal electrogenesis. Na_{v}1.7 activity consists of a slow transition of the channel into an inactive state when it is depolarized, even to a minor degree. This property allows these channels to remain available for activation with even small or slowly developing depolarizations. Stimulation of the nociceptor nerve endings produces "generator potentials", small changes in the voltage across the neuronal membranes. This brings neurons to a voltage that stimulate Na_{v}1.8, which has a more depolarized activation threshold that produces most of the transmembrane current responsible for the depolarizing phase of action potentials.

== Cell-Based Assays ==
Heteromultimeric ion channels such as Na_{v}1.7 comprise multiple subunits including a pore forming subunits and accessory subunits. Creation of laboratory cells that comprise multiple subunits is challenging. Fluorogenic signaling probes and flow cytometry have been used to create laboratory cells that comprise heteromultimetic Na_{v}1.7 including at least two of its accessory subunits.

== Clinical significance ==
=== Animal studies ===
The critical role of Na_{v}1.7 in nociception and pain was originally shown using Cre-Lox recombination tissue specific knockout mice. These transgenic mice specifically lack Na_{v}1.7 in Na_{v}1.8 positive nociceptors and showed reduced behavioural responses, specifically to acute mechanical and inflammatory pain assays. At the same time, behavioural responses to acute thermal and neuropathic pain assays remained intact. However, the expression of Na_{v}1.7 is not restricted to Na_{v}1.8 positive DRG neurons. Further work examining the behavioural response of two other transgenic mouse strains; one lacking Na_{v}1.7 in all DRG neurons and the other lacking Na_{v}1.7 in all DRG neurons as well as all sympathetic neurons, has revealed distinct sets of modality specific peripheral neurons. Therefore, Na_{v}1.7 expressed in Na_{v}1.8 positive DRG neurons is critical for normal responses to acute mechanical and inflammatory pain assays. Whilst Na_{v}1.7 expressed in Na_{v}1.8 negative DRG neurons is critical for normal responses to acute thermal pain assays. Finally, Nav1.7 expressed in sympathetic neurons is critical for normal behavioural responses to neuropathic pain assays.

=== Primary erythromelalgia ===
Mutation in Na_{v}1.7 may result in primary erythromelalgia (PE), an autosomal dominant, inherited disorder which is characterized by attacks or episodes of symmetrical burning pain of the feet, lower legs, and sometimes hands, elevated skin temperature of affected areas, and reddened extremities. The mutation causes excessive channel activity which suggests that Na_{v}1.7 sets the gain on pain signaling in humans. It was observed that a missense mutation in the SCN9A gene affected conserved residues in the pore-forming α subunit of the Na_{v}1.7 channel. Multiple studies have found a dozen SCN9A mutations in multiple families as causing erythromelagia. All of the observed erythromelalgia mutations that are observed are missense mutations that change important and highly conserved amino acid residues of the Na_{v}1.7 protein. The majority of mutations that cause PE are located in cytoplasmic linkers of the Na_{v}1.7 channel, however some mutations are present in transmembrane domains of the channel. The PE mutations cause a hyperpolarizing shift in the voltage dependence of channel activation, which allows the channel to be activated by smaller than normal depolarizations, thus enhancing the activity of Na_{v}1.7. Moreover, the majority of the PE mutations also slow deactivation, thus keeping the channel open longer once it is activated. In addition, in response to a slow, depolarizing stimulus, most mutant channels will generate a larger than normal sodium current. Each of these alterations in activation and deactivation can contribute to the hyperexcitability of pain-signaling DRG neurons expressing these mutant channels, thus causing extreme sensitivity to pain (hyperalgesia). While the expression of PE Na_{v}1.7 mutations produces hyperexcitability in DRG neurons, studies on cultured rat in sympathetic ganglion neurons indicate that expression of these same PE mutations results in reduction of excitability of these cells. This occurs because Na_{v}1.8 channels, which are selectively expressed in addition to Na_{v}1.7 in DRG neurons, are not present within sympathetic ganglion neurons. Thus lack of Na_{v}1.7 results in inactivation of the sodium channels results in reduced excitability. Thus physiological interaction of Na_{v}1.7 and Na_{v}1.8 can explain the reason that PE presents with pain due to hyperexcitability of nociceptors and with sympathetic dysfunction that is most likely due to hypoexcitability of sympathetic ganglion neurons. Recent studies have associated a defect in SCN9A with congenital insensitivity to pain.

=== Paroxysmal extreme pain disorder ===
Paroxysmal extreme pain disorder (PEPD) is another rare, extreme pain disorder. Like primary erythromelalgia, PEPD is similarly the result of a gain-of-function mutation in the gene encoding the Na_{v}1.7 channel. The decreased inactivation caused by the mutation is cause of prolonged action potentials and repetitive firing. Such altered firing will cause increased pain sensation and increased sympathetic nervous system activity, producing the phenotype observed in patients with PEPD.

=== Congenital insensitivity to pain ===
Individuals with congenital insensitivity to pain have painless injuries beginning in infancy but otherwise normal sensory responses upon examination. Patients frequently have bruises and cuts, and are often only diagnosed because of limping or lack of use of a limb. Individuals have been reported to be able to walk over burning coals and to insert knives and drive spikes through their arms. It has been observed that the insensitivity to pain does not appear to be due to axonal degeneration.

A mutation that causes loss of Na_{v}1.7 function has been detected in three consanguineous families from northern Pakistan. All mutations observed were nonsense mutation, with the majority of affected patients having a homozygous mutation in the SCN9A gene. This discovery linked loss of Na_{v}1.7 function with the inability to experience pain. This is in contrast with the genetic basis of primary erythromelalgia in which the disorder results from gain-of-function mutations.

=== Clinical analgesics ===
Local anesthetics such as lidocaine, but also the anticonvulsant phenytoin, mediate their analgesic effects by non-selectively blocking voltage-gated sodium channels. Na_{v}1.7, as well as Na_{v}1.3, Na_{v}1.8, and Na_{v}1.9, are the specific channels that have been implicated in pain signaling. Thus, the blockade of these specific channels is likely to underlie the analgesia of local anesthetics and anticonvulsants such as phenytoin. In addition, inhibition of these channels is also likely responsible for the analgesic efficacy of certain tricyclic antidepressants, and of mexiletine.

=== Itch ===
Mutations of Na_{v}1.7 have been linked to itching (pruritus), and genetic knockouts of Na_{v}1.7 and an antibody that inhibits Na_{v}1.7 also appear to inhibit itching.

=== Future prospects ===
As the Na_{v}1.7 channel appears to be a highly important component in nociception, with null activity conferring total analgesia, there has been immense interest in developing selective Na_{v}1.7 channel blockers as potential novel analgesics. Since Na_{v}1.7 is not present in heart tissue or the central nervous system, selective blockers of Na_{v}1.7, unlike non-selective blockers such as local anesthetics, could be safely used systemically for pain relief. Moreover, selective Na_{v}1.7 blockers may prove to be far more effective analgesics, and with fewer undesirable effects, relative to current pharmacotherapies.

A number of selective Na_{v}1.7 (and/or Na_{v}1.8) blockers are in clinical development, including funapide (TV-45070, XEN402), PF-05089771, DSP-2230, NKTR-171, GDC-0276, and RG7893 (GDC-0287). Ralfinamide (formerly NW-1029, FCE-26742A, PNU-0154339E) is a multimodal, non-selective Na_{v} channel blocker which is under development for the treatment of pain.

Surprisingly, many potent Na_{v}1.7 blockers have been found to be clinically effective but only relatively weak analgesics. Recently, it has been elucidated that congenital loss of Nav_{v}1.7 results in a dramatic increase in the levels of endogenous enkephalins, and it was found that blocking these opioids with the opioid antagonist naloxone allowed for pain sensitivity both in Nav_{v}1.7 null mice and in a woman with a defective Nav_{v}1.7 gene and associated congenital insensitivity to pain. Development of the venom-derived peptide, JNJ63955 allowed for selective inhibition of Na_{v}1.7 only while it was in the closed state, which produced results, in mice, much more similar to knock-out models. It is possible that channel blockade is maximal only when the channel is inhibited in its closed state. It appears that complete inactivation of Na_{v}1.7-mediated sodium efflux is necessary to upregulate enkephalin expression enough to achieve complete analgesia. Prior to the development of JNJ63955, the most potent [Na_{v} 1.7] antagonists had failed in regards to achieving the same degree of analgesia as congenital Na_{v}1.7 inactivity. The proposed mechanism also suggests that the analgesic effects of Na_{v}1.7 blockers may be greatly potentiated by the co-administration of exogenous opioids or enkephalinase inhibitors. Supporting this idea, a strong analgesic synergy between local anesthetics and topical opioids has already been observed in clinical research.

An additional implication of the aforementioned findings is that congenital insensitivity to pain may be clinically treatable with opioid antagonists.

In 2021, researchers described a novel approach, developing a CRISPR-dCas9 epigenome editing method for a potential treatment of chronic pain by repressing Na_{v}1.7 gene expression which showed therapeutic potential in three mouse models of chronic pain.
