= Syb-prII-1 =

Ion channel toxin Syb-prI-1

Syb-prII-1 is a β-type neurotoxin from the venom of the scorpion Olivierus martensii. It reduces the activity and the expression of the voltage-gated sodium channel Na_{v}1.8.

== Sources ==
Syb-prII-1 is a neurotoxin isolated from the venom of the Chinese scorpion Olivierus martensii, previously known as Buthus martensii.

== Chemistry ==
Syb-prII-1 is part of the family of β-scorpion toxins. This protein contains 62 amino acids and consists of three β-sheets and an α-helix, held together by four cross-linked disulfide bonds. It has 78.69% sequence identity with the neurotoxin LqhIT2.

== Target and mode of action ==
Syb-prII-1 binds to the voltage-gated sodium channel (VGSC) Na_{v}1.8. It specifically targets receptor site 4, causing a leftward shift in the voltage dependency of both activation and inactivation. No significant effects on the voltage dependency of Na_{v}1.9 has been observed. In addition, Syb-prII-1 inhibits the peak amplitude of Na_{v}1.8 currents with an IC_{50} of 133 nM and a maximum inhibition of 52%. No significant inhibition of Na_{v}1.9 was observed. Syb-prII-1 also reduces the phosphorylation level of several proteins within the MAPKs pathway, which is associated with neuropathic pain. This in turn reduces the expression of Na_{v}1.8, reducing the current even further

== Therapeutic use ==
Syp-prII-1 exerts an anti-inflammatory effect by reducing the expression of inflammatory cytokines IL-1β, IL-6, and TNF-α. It also asserts an analgesic effect by partially blocking the current through Nav1.8. For this reason, this has been explored as a possible treatment for trigeminal neuralgia.
