= N58A =

N58A is a peptide depressant β-neurotoxin found in the venom of certain East Asian scorpions. The toxin affects voltage-gated sodium channels, specifically Na_{v}1.8 & Na_{v}1.9 channels.

== Etymology and Chemistry ==
The N58A protein is a scorpion depressant β-toxin, in which the asparagine (N) on the 58th position of the peptide is exchanged for an alanine (A) amino acid. In scorpion depressant β-toxins, the N58 amino acid is known to play an important role in its activity, and the substitution with alanine severely reduces the toxicity of the peptide. The molecular mass of N58A is approximately 9 kDa with a UV absorption peak of 279.4 nm.

== Sources ==
N58A is originally found in the venom of some East Asian scorpion species., similar to the one found in Leiurus quinquestriatus hebraeus, whose venom contains the structurally similar LqhIT2 toxin. In addition, N58A can be obtained by using molecular biology techniques such as PCR amplification and recombinant technology to express the peptide in E. coli

== Target and mode of action ==
N58A affects voltage-gated sodium channels, and its effects have specifically been shown on the Na_{v}1.8 and Na_{v}1.9 channels. These effects include a reduction in neuronal channel expression and current density, and shifts of the channel activation and inactivation to more depolarized and hyperpolarized membrane potentials, respectively.

Aside from acting on voltage-gated sodium channels, N58A also reduces phosphorylation of MAPK pathway proteins, most importantly the ERK 1/2 (affecting the posterior horn of the spinal cord) and P38 (involved in inflammatory and analgesic processes). As a result of the aforementioned effects, the transmission of peripheral pain signals is blocked.

The analgesic effect of N58A is similar to that of morphine, which also reduces the protein phosphorylation in the MAPK pathway, but to a lesser extent. However, morphine does not have an effect on the Na_{v}1.8 and Na_{v}1.9 channels, in contrast to N58A.

== Toxicity and treatment ==
Scorpion depressant beta-toxins are selectively toxic to insects, and when N58A is applied at a dose of 400 μg/100 mg of body weight in rats, no neurotoxicity is observed. As such, there is no need for treatment of the toxin in human cases.

== Therapeutic use ==
Due to its analgesic effect, N58A has been tested as a possible treatment for trigeminal neuralgia in a rat model. This model shows a reduced threshold for thermal and mechanical pain, which was alleviated by administration of N58A. At a dose of 400 μg/100 mg of body weight, the analgesic effects of N58A last for several hours and are similar to the effects of morphine. The injection of N58A does not affect motor control of the limbs in rats
