= RTX-III =

Sea anemone neurotoxin

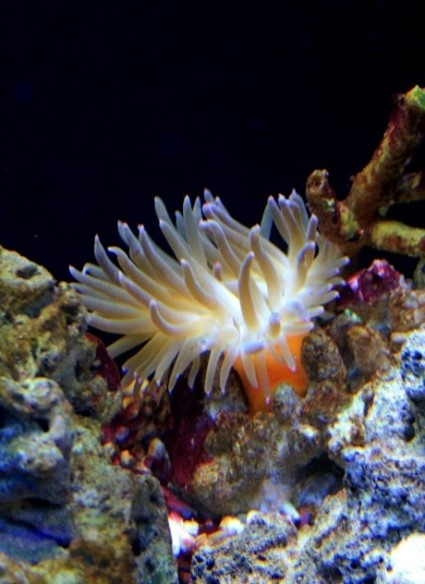
Sea anemone Sebae anemone, (Heteractis crispa) in Prague sea aquarium "Sea world", Czech Republic

RTX-III (neurotoxin-III,δ-SHTX-Hcr1a) is a neurotoxin peptide derived from the Sebae anemone Radianthus crispa. The toxin targets voltage-dependent sodium channels by preventing its complete inactivation, which can lead to a prolonged influx of sodium ions and depolarization of the cell's membrane.

== Source ==
RTX-III is secreted by the sea anemone Radianthus crispa, also known as Heteractis crispa or Radianthus macrodactylus, which inhabits the Indian and Pacific Oceans.

== Structure ==
=== Primary structure ===
The RTX-III neuropeptide consists of 48 amino acids cross-linked by three disulfide bridges.

The amino acid sequence of the neurotoxin-III is:

GNCKCDDEGPYVRTAPLTGYVDLGYCNEGWEKCASYYSPIAECCRKKK

and its molecular mass is 5378.33 Da.

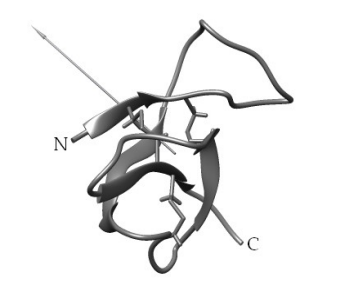
3D-model of the structure of RTX-III

=== Secondary structure ===
Due to RTX-III's structural characteristics, this toxin is categorized as a type II sea anemone neurotoxin. The toxin has a guanidine group of Arg13 residues, as well as disulfide bridges, which may be important in maintaining its active conformation.

== Homology ==
RTX-III is highly homologous with ShI, also a type II toxin, from the sea anemone Stichodactyla helianthus, whose sequence is 88% identical. RTX-III also shares significant homology with other toxins in the type II family, including RpII and RTX-VI.

== Target ==
RTX-III is a Na_{v} activator (also known as a sodium channel opener), which elicits changes in the functioning voltage-gated sodium channels of arthropods, insects and mammals. Research has shown evidence of affinity binding with various types of sodium channels. The toxin modulates the BgNa_{v}1 subtype of insects and the VdNa_{v}1 subtype of arachnoids. In mammals, it selectively modulates Na_{v} 1.3 and Na_{v}1.6 sodium channels.

All sea anemone toxins are thought to bind within binding site 3 of voltage-dependent sodium channels. The binding site for RTX-III, in particular, is proposed to overlap with that of the channel-inactivating scorpion α-toxins and spider δ-toxins, though it is not entirely identical.

== Mode of action ==
RTX-III prevents or reduces the speed with which sodium channels are inactivated. The toxin inhibits the inactivation of the voltage-dependent sodium channels in a selective manner. The sodium channels may stay open for longer than normal, and consequently, the influx of sodium is prolonged. In turn, the influx of sodium may depolarize the membrane potential value towards a more positive membrane potential. Therefore, inactivation will be incomplete and less sensitive to any potential changes, slowing down the kinetics of sodium inactivation.

RTX-III differs from the conventional way in which sea anemones operate – an arginine residue being the center of binding with a sodium channel. In the case of neurotoxin-III, it is hypothesized that Arg13 may play a role in selecting specific sodium channel isoforms. However, these findings might only partially apply to RTX-III since a different, homologous toxin was investigated – RTX-VI.

== Toxicity and potency ==
RTX-III presents a high toxicity in mammals. The LD_{50} for mice varies from 25 to 40 μg/kg, while the LD_{100} is 82 μg/kg in arthropods. Specific amino acid substitutions in the RTX-III sequence occur at the positions most toxic for mice.

The EC_{50} values of RTX-III also differ between mammals (381.8 nM) and insects/arthropods (978.1 nM). RTX-III displays a lower potency in arachnid and insect channels, with relatively high EC_{50} values. However, in mammalian channels the toxin may be more potent, showing smaller EC_{50} values. Since RTX-III is produced by a sea anemone, its main role is the effective modulation of arthropod sodium channels, so that the prey is immobilized but not necessarily killed.

Table 1. LD_{50}, LD_{100} and EC_{50} values of the Heteractis neurotoxin RTX-III
	LD_{50} (μg/kg)	LD_{100}(μg/kg)	EC_{50} (nM)
Mammals	25-40	x	381.8
Insects / Arthropods	x	82	978.1

RTX-III's toxic properties are distributed between its many functional groups, such as the Arg-13 guanidine group and the Gly-1 amino group.
