= Makatoxin-3 =

Makatoxin-3, a neurotoxin from scorpion

Makatoxin-3 (a.k.a. MkTx-3, MKTX III or Makatx III) is an α-like scorpion neurotoxin found in the venom of Olivierus martensii. Makatoxin-3 both enhances the activation and slows down the inactivation of voltage-gated Na_{V}1.7 channels, resulting in hyperexcitability of the neurons involved in pain perception.

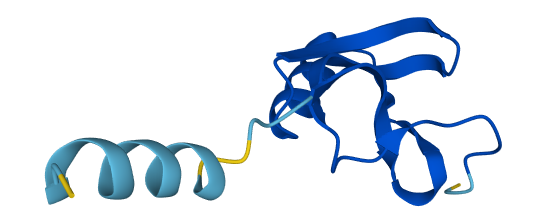
Chemical structure of Makatoxin-3

== Source ==
Makatoxin-3 is a neurotoxin that can be found in the venom of the scorpion Olivierus martensii, also known as Buthus martensii Karsch (BmK) or the Chinese Scorpion. This scorpion is also commonly known as the Chinese scorpion, as it is widely found in China, as well as Korea and Mongolia. Makatoxins account for approximately 4% of the total BmK venom protein. After high temperature processing of the venom, Makatoxins make up 0.8% of the total protein.

== Chemistry ==
Makatoxin-3 is made up of 85 amino acid residues, 19 of which make up the signal peptide at the N-terminal, and four disulfide bonds. It has a high sequence homology (90% identity) with two other toxins from the same Makatoxin protein family, Makatoxin-1 and Makatoxin-2.

Properties
Protein Length	Molecular Mass (Da)
85	9,434

The full amino acid sequence of Makatoxin-3 is the following (with the mature peptide underlined):

MNYLI VISFA LLLMT GVESG RDAYI AKKEN CTYFC ALNPY CNDLC TKNGA KSGYC QWAGR YGNAC WCIDL PDKVP IRIPG PCIGR

For comparison, the amino acid sequence of Mktx-2 is (again with the mature peptide underlined):

MNYLI VISFA LLLMT SVESG RDAYI ADSEN CTYFC GSNPY CNDLC TENGA KSGYC QWAGR YGNAC WCIDL PDKVP IRIPG PCRGR

Two key residues of Makatoxin-3 have been identified: K9 and R58. Their substitutions K9D and R58A in mutated Makatoxin-3 reduce the efficacy of the toxin to cause pain in mice.

Makatoxin-3 is thermostable, as processing it by high temperature (60 °C) does not affect the bioactivity of Makatoxin-3 despite the protein concentration going down by 50%. Makatoxin-3 is also stable in artificial gastric juice, but not in artificial intestinal juice, so Makatoxin-3 may be protected from enzymatic digestion.

== Target and Mode of Action ==
Makatoxin-3 is an α-toxin that binds to the S3-S4 loops of the voltage sensor domain IV (VSD_{4}) of Na_{V}1.7 in dorsal root ganglion (DRG) neurons. It is a Na_{V}1.7 agonist. Makatoxin-3 has little to no effect on Na_{V}1.1, Na_{V}1.3, Na_{V}1.6, Na_{V}1.8, and Na_{V}1.9 channels.

Makatoxin-3 shows dose-dependent effects on both the activation and the inactivation of Na_{V}1.7. The toxin slows the inactivation kinetics of Na_{V}1.7 currents. The average persistent currents are larger at both low (250 nmol/kg) and high (750 nmol/kg) concentrations due to the incomplete Na_{V}1.7 channel inactivation at depolarized potentials (-45 mV and higher). At high concentration (750 nmol/kg), the curve of the peak current shifts to the left of the hyperpolarization direction, reaching the peak earlier than in the absence of the toxin; the action potential is also prolonged by shifting the steady-state fast inactivation current to hyperpolarization potentials by -9.3 mV. Furthermore, at high concentration (750 nmol/kg), Makatoxin-3 causes Na_{V}1.7 to open at hyperpolarized potential by shifting its voltage-dependent activation curve by -8.6 mV.

== Toxicity ==
Makatoxin-3 evokes pain and allodynia. After injecting 25 nmol/kg, 50 nmol/kg, and 150 nmol/kg of Makatoxin-3 respectively, mice exhibit flinching behavior due to the pain-inducing effect for approximately 30 minutes before diminishing in a dose-dependent manner (the higher the dose, the higher the number of flinches).

== Therapeutic use ==
Interestingly, notwithstanding the pain response induced by the toxin, Makatoxin-3 also shows an analgesic effect in a dose-dependent manner (50 nmol/kg, 150 nmol/kg, and 450 nmol/kg). 450 nmol/kg elicits an 80% reduction of paw-flinch pain behavior in mice when they are intraperitoneally injected with another pain-inducing substance 30 minutes after the Makatoxin-3 injection. However, if the scorpion body is processed by high temperature, it requires an even higher concentration of Makatoxin-3 to elicit the analgesic effect due to the loss of these peptides. A mutant variant of the neurotoxin, Makatoxin-3-R58A, still produces the analgesic effect, but largely loses its pain-inducing effect.

Unlike morphine, which is a strong opioid receptor analgesic with the addictive side effect, the analgesic activity induced by Makatoxin-3 cannot be reversed by naloxone (μ-opioid receptor antagonist). This means that Makatoxin-3 has an analgesic effect that is not dependent on the endogenous opioid system. Therefore, Makatoxin-3 is being studied as a new potential painkiller.
