= C17H19FN2O2 =

The molecular formula C_{17}H_{19}FN_{2}O_{2} (molar mass: 302.34 g/mol, exact mass: 302.1431 u) may refer to:

- Ralfinamide (NW-1029)
- Safinamide
