= DKK-Sp1 =

Neurotoxin present in Mesobuthus martensii

DKK-SP1 is one of the many neurotoxins present in the scorpion Mesobuthus martensii. This toxin inhibits the voltage-gated sodium channel Nav1.8.

== Sources ==
DKK-SP1 is a neurotoxin, which is named after the DKK-SP1 gene that is extracted from a cDNA library of Mesobuthus martensii. DKK-SP1 naturally occurs in the venom gland located in its stinger (or telson). This scorpion is also known as the Golden Chinese Scorpion or the Manchurian scorpion. It was formerly called Buthus martensii Karsch (BmK).

== Chemistry ==
=== Family ===
DKK-SP1 is part of the alpha-like toxin family of scorpion toxins, which typically consist of 60 to 76 amino acid residues. DKK-SP1 specifically is composed of 66 amino acid residues folded into beta sheets with an alpha helix atop. The structures of these alpha-like toxins are linked together by four disulfide bonds.

=== Structure ===
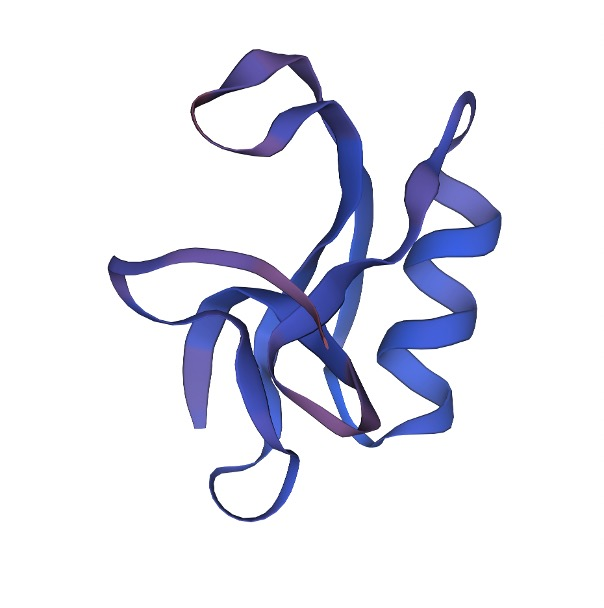
projected image of the protein structure of DKK-SP1 ion channel toxin generated using SWISS-MODEL.COM

The molecular mass of the peptide chain of the toxin is 7157.96 Da. Its gene sequence is as follows:

GTTCGTGATGCTTATATTGCCAAGCCCGAAAACTGTGTATACCATTGTGCTACAAATGAAGGTTGCAACAAATTATGTACTGACAATGGTGCTGAGAGTGGCTATTGCC AATGGGGAGGTAGATATGGAAATGCCTGCTGGTGCATAAAGTTGCCCGATAGTGTACCGATTGAAGTACCAGGAAAATGCCAACGCTAA

As a result, the amino acid sequence is:

Val-Arg-Asp-Ala-Tyr-Ile-Ala-Lys-Pro-Glu-Asn-Cys-Val-Tyr-His-Cys-Ala-Thr-Asn-Glu-Gly-Cys-Asn-Lys-Leu-Cys-Thr-Asp-Asn-Gly-Ala-Glu-Ser-Gly-Tyr-Cys-Gln-Trp-Gly-Gly-Arg-Tyr-Gly-Asn-Ala-Cys-Trp-Cys-Ile-Lys-Leu-Pro-Asp-Ser-Val-Pro-Ile-Glu-Val-Pro-Gly-Lys-Cys-Gln-Arg

=== Homology ===
DKK-SP1 shares 92.19% of its amino acid sequence with BmK M4, which also is a scorpion alpha-like toxin. DKK-SP1 is also functionally similar to delta-conotoxins, which binds to the receptor site 6 of voltage-gated sodium channel, slowing the channel’s inactivation state.

== Target ==
DKK-SP1 specifically targets site 3 of the voltage-gated sodium channel, Nav1.8.

== Mode of Action ==
The alpha-like toxin family of scorpion toxins occupies the receptor site 3 of voltage-gated sodium channels. Receptor site 3 is located between segments 3 and 4 of the alpha subunit of the voltage-gated sodium channel. Mechanically, alpha-like scorpion toxins prevent the normal gating movement of the sodium channel S4 segment by changing its conformational properties. This leads to delayed channel inactivation, which prolongs the depolarization phase of the action potential.

== Toxicity ==
Generally, Mesobuthus martensii is not considered as highly lethal to humans. Scorpion injuries usually cause skin redness, swelling, and numbness. The Buthus scorpion may also provoke symptoms of severe excitation of the autonomic nervous system. The LD_{50} of Mesobuthus martensii toxins is 2.4 mg/kg in humans. The LD_{50} of DKK-Sp1 in mice is 20.57 grams/kg.

== Treatment ==
Although Mesobuthus martensii is not considered as a particularly lethal scorpion, its injuries may still cause local symptoms. Treatment against such effects is mostly symptomatic. Moderate and severe cases may require hospitalization.

DKK-SP1 exhibits anti-inflammatory properties in mice. Mesobuthus martensii toxins have been used in Chinese medicine for years. However, no clinical trials have been performed on humans yet.
