= List of investigational analgesics =

This is a list of investigational analgesics, or analgesics that are currently under development for clinical use but are not yet approved. Chemical/generic names are listed first, with developmental code names, synonyms, and brand names in parentheses.

This list was last comprehensively updated in June 2017. It is likely to become outdated with time.

== Opioid receptor modulators ==
- Axelopran/oxycodone – combination of a centrally active μ-opioid receptor agonist and a peripherally selective μ-, κ-, and δ-opioid receptor antagonist.
- Cebranopadol (GRT-6005) – non-selective μ-opioid receptor, nociceptin receptor, and δ-opioid receptor full agonist and κ-opioid receptor partial agonist
- Desmetramadol (O-desmethyltramadol; Omnitram) – μ-opioid receptor agonist, norepinephrine reuptake inhibitor (NRI), and 5-HT_{2C} receptor antagonist.
- Deumitragynine (KUR-101) – atypical μ-opioid receptor agonist related to mitragynine (found in kratom)
- Lexanopadol (GRT-6006, GRT13106G) – non-selective opioid receptor agonist
- Oxycodone/naltrexone – combination of a μ-opioid receptor agonist and a μ- and κ-opioid receptor antagonist.

== Sodium channel blockers ==
- BIIB-095 – state-dependent and use-dependent Na_{v} blocker, including Na_{v}1.7.
- CC-8464 (ASP-1807) – selective Na_{v}1.7 blocker
- Cenobamate (YKP-3089) – atypical voltage-gated sodium channel blocker.
- DSP-2230 – selective Na_{v}1.7 and Na_{v}1.8 blocker.
- Funapide (TV-45070, XEN402) – selective Na_{v}1.7 and Na_{v}1.8 blocker.
- GDC-0276 (RG-7893) – selective Na_{v}1.7 blocker
- GDC-0310 (RG-6029) – selective Na_{v}1.7 blocker
- NKTR-171 – voltage-gated sodium channel blocker
- PF-05089771 – selective Na_{v}1.7 and Na_{v}1.8 blocker
- Ralfinamide (NW-1029) – non-selective voltage-gated sodium channel blocker, as well as other actions
- Tetrodotoxin (9401-TTX; Tectin, Tetrodin, Tocudin) – non-selective voltage-gated sodium channel blocker
- Vixotrigine (formerly raxatrigine; CNV1014802, GSK-1014802, BIIB 074) – non-selective voltage-gated sodium channel blocker
- VX-150 – selective Na_{v}1.8 blocker
- VX-993 – selective Na_{v}1.8 blocker

== Calcium channel blockers ==
- HSK16149 – selective ligand of α_{2}δ subunit of voltage-gated calcium channel

== TRP channel modulators ==
- Capsaicin (Adlea, ALGRX-4975, CNTX-4975, VLNX-4975) – TRPV1 agonist
- Capsaicin/diclofenac – combination of a TRPV1 agonist and a COX-2 inhibitor for topical application
- CMX-020 – TRPV1 modulator as well as CB_{1} and CB_{2} receptor modulator
- DWP-05195 (TR-1) – TRPV1 antagonist
- GRC-6211 – TRPV1 agonist
- JNJ-38893777 – TRPV1 antagonist
- Mavatrep (JNJ‐39439335) – TRPV1 antagonist.
- NEO-6860 – TRPV1 antagonist
- Parentide (DD-04107) – TRPV1 antagonist
- Resiniferatoxin (RTX; MCP-101) – TRPV1 agonist
- SAR-115740 – TRPV1 antagonist
- Tivanisiran (SYL-1001) – TRPV1 antagonist

== Cannabinoid receptor modulators ==
- Cannabidiol (CBD) – cannabinoid receptor modulator
- Cannabidivarin (CBDV; GWP-42006) – cannabinoid receptor modulator
- CMX-020 – TRPV1 modulator as well as CB_{1} and CB_{2} receptor modulator
- Dronabinol (Δ^{9}-THC; ECP022A, Namisol) – CB_{1} and CB_{2} receptor agonist
- Elcubragistat (ABX-1431; Lu-AG06466) – selective monoacylglycerol lipase (MAGL) inhibitor
- Nabilone – CB_{1} and CB_{2} receptor agonist
- NEO-1940 – CB_{1} and CB_{2} receptor agonist
- Olorinab (APD-371) – CB_{2} receptor agonist

== Nerve growth factor inhibitors ==
- Fasinumab (REGN-475, SAR-164877) – monoclonal antibody against nerve growth factor
- Fulranumab (AMG-403, JNJ-42160443) – monoclonal antibody against nerve growth factor
- GBR-900 – monoclonal antibody against TrkA
- GZ-389988 – TrkA, TrkB, and TrkC kinase inhibitor
- LEVI-04 (p75^{NTR}-Fc) – LNGF receptor (p75^{NTR}) fusion protein and decoy receptor for nerve growth factor
- NRD135S-E1 – tyrosine kinase modulator
- ONO-4474 – peripherally selective TrkA, TrkB, and TrkC kinase inhibitor
- Ranevetmab (NV-01) – monoclonal antibody against nerve growth factor for dogs
- Tanezumab (PF-4383119, RI-624, RN-624) – monoclonal antibody against nerve growth factor
- VM-902A – selective, peripherally selective allosteric inhibitor of TrkA

== Others ==
- ALLOD-2 – toll-like receptor 4 (TLR4) antagonist and COX-2 inhibitor
- CM-304 – sigma-1 receptor antagonist. Cold version of radiotracer [18F] FTC-146
- CR-4056 – imidazoline I_{2} receptor agonist
- E-52862 (MR-309; S1A; S1RA) – sigma-1 receptor antagonist
- HSP-3150 (HP-3150) – COX-2 inhibitor; transdermal formulation of diclofenac
- KCP-506 – nicotinic acetylcholine receptor antagonist
- KNX-101 – 15-lipoxygenase (15-LOX; ALOX15) inhibitor
- LATER – CRISPR-dCas9 gene-editing
- PAX-01 – undefined mechanism of action
- Opiranserin - Dual 5HT2A Receptor antagonist and GlyT2 inhibitor

== See also ==
- List of investigational drugs
