= LmαTX5 =

LmαTX5 is an α-scorpion toxin which inhibits the fast inactivation of voltage-gated sodium channels. It has been identified through transcriptome analysis of the venom gland of Lychas mucronatus, also known as the Chinese swimming scorpion – a scorpion species which is widely distributed in Southeast Asia.

== Etymology ==
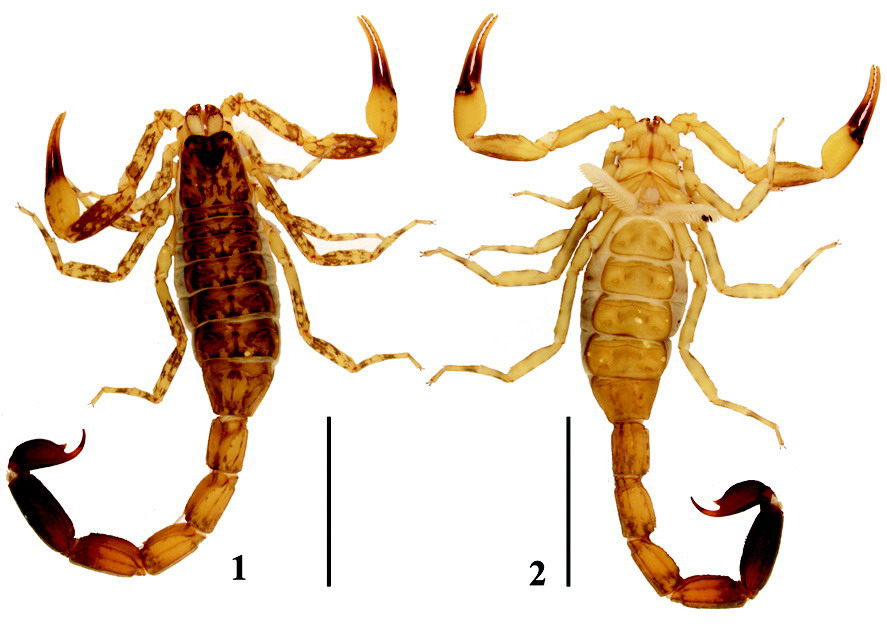
Lychas mucronatus, male

LmαTX5 derives its name from Lychas mucronatus (Lm) and is an α-scorpion toxin (αTX).

== Sources ==
LmαTX5 was identified in a transcriptome analysis of the venom gland of Lychas mucronatus. For research purposes the toxin was produced in the Escherichia coli to allow further characterization.

== Chemistry ==
LmαTX5 full peptide is 81 amino acids in length, which comprises a signal peptide of 19 amino acids, and has a molecular mass of 9.4 kDa. The mature LmαTX5 is 62 amino acids in length, tightly bound by four disulfide bridges (indicated by * in the sequence):

Lys-Lys-Asp-Gly-Tyr-Pro-Tyr-Asp-Asp-Lys-Glu-Cys*-Lys-Tyr-Asp-Cys**-Trp-Lys-Asn-Glu-Tyr-Cys***-Asn-Asp-Leu-Cys****-Lys-Lys-Lys-Lys-Gly-Glu-Ser-Gly-Tyr-Cys**-Tyr-Ala-Leu-Asn-Leu-Ser-Cys***-Tyr-Cys****-Tyr-Gly-Leu-Pro-Asp-Lys-Glu-Lys-Thr-Ser-Arg-Thr-Gly-Lys-Cys*-Arg-Gly

The predicted 3D-structure resembles a common cysteine-stabilized CSαβ structural motif for α-scorpion toxins consisting of a short-segmented α-helix coupled to a triple-stranded β-sheet, connected by four disulfide bridges forming loops. The similar functional residues in the conserved NC-domain (Tyr7, Lys10, Arg56, Arg61) and Core-domain (Trp17, Asn40) together with the common CSαβ structural motif and the amino acid length strongly relate LmaTX5 to other α-scorpion toxins that specifically target voltage-gated sodium channels. Moreover, LmαTX5 resembles LmαTX3 in length (i.e., 62 amino acids) and function (e.g., affecting predominantly mNav1.4 and hNav1.5 sodium channels).

== Target ==
Pharmacological experiments showed that the recombinant LmαTX5 toxin targets voltage–gated sodium channel isoforms. LmαTX5 affects Nav1.5 (EC50 = 1.03 ± 0.43 μM) and Nav1.4 (EC50 = 4.53 ± 1.38 μM, mostly found in skeletal muscles), and moderately inhibits Nav1.7 (EC50 = 67.62 ± 2.31 μM, mostly found in peripheral nervous system), while Nav1.2 is hardly affected. Its pharmacological profile is quite similar to α-scorpion toxin LmαTX3.

== Mode of action ==
LmαTX5 might be considered as a gating–modifier toxin that disables outward movement of the voltage sensor causing prolongation of sodium inward flow. The structural similarity of LmαTX5 to the α-scorpion toxin group suggests that LmαTX5 likely binds to neurotoxin receptor site 3 of sodium channels. This receptor site is located on the extracellular loop, connecting transmembrane segments S3 and S4 of domain IV, that plays the role of a voltage sensor by moving outwards during depolarization. The predicted inhibitory mechanism of LmαTX5 involves preventing conformational changes within the IVS4 that affects its outward movement, thus inhibiting sodium channel inactivation. Action potentials would become prolonged by the toxin. This action mechanism is expected based on the structure of the toxin, but still lacks experimental conformation. Similarly, based on homology, binding of LmαTX5 to the receptor site may be weakened by membrane depolarization.

== Toxicity ==
Based on affected channel subtypes, LmαTX5 could be expected to cause cardiac arrhythmia, by altering action potential propagation through the heart resulting in severe cardiac rhythm impairment, and inhibition of action potential propagation in neurons and skeletal muscles leading to paralysis of the prey.
