= LmαTX3 =

Scorpion toxin

LmαTX3 is an α-scorpion toxin from Lychas mucronatus. that inhibits fast inactivation of voltage gated sodium-channels (VGSCs).

== Etymology ==
The LmαTX3 toxin derives the first part of its name from the source of the venom (Lychas mucronatus, 'Lm') , the middle part due to its nature as an α-scorpion toxin ('αTX'), and the last part as a reflection of the binding to receptor site 3 the toxin acts upon.

== Sources ==
LmαTX3 is a toxin expressed and secreted by the venom gland of Lychas mucronatus, a scorpion from the family Buthidae found in China, Laos, Thailand and other regions of Asia.

== Chemistry ==
Scorpion toxins targeting VGSGs (also called NaTX) are usually polypeptides composed of 61–76 amino acids cross-linked by four disulfide bridges. LmαTX3 consists of the same disulfide bridge pattern and conserved residues as sodium channel-specific modulators, thus suggesting its modulating effect on sodium channels. Analysis of the amino acid sequence in cDNA previously acquired of the Lychas mucronatus showed that LmαTX3 contained 21 residues in their signal peptides, and 62 residues in their mature peptides (the peptide remaining after the cleaving of the signal peptide).

Modelling of the 3D structure of LmαTX3 showed a typical cysteine-stabilized α-helix/β-sheet motif (CSαβ motif), with the α-helix stabilized by two disulfide bridges to one strand of the β sheet. Similar to other α-scorpion toxins, LmαTX3 presented with potential functional residues in the conversed NC-domains (Lys1, Lys8, Lys 51, Asn53, Ile54 and Lys57) and the Core-domains (Arg14, Lys23, Arg39 and Lys 42). Therefore, there are strong suggestions that LmαTX3 falls under the NaTX type of channels.

The molecular weight of LmαTX3 is 9.2 kDa.

== Target ==
Electrophysiological experiments have evaluated the effect of recombinant LmαTX3 on the following four types of sodium channels:

- rNav1.2: expressed at high levels in the central nervous system
- mNav1.4: mostly found in adult skeletal muscles
- hNav1.5: mostly found in embryonic and denervated skeletal muscle and heart muscle
- hNav1.7: primarily in the peripheral nervous system

LmαTX3 inhibits fast inactivation of these types of sodium channels. It modulates the inactivation of mNa_{v}1.4 and hNa_{v}1.5 channels more potently than of hNa_{v}1.7 channels and especially rNa_{v}1.2 channels, similar to LmαTX5.

== Mode of Action ==
The α-toxins can inhibit the fast inactivation of VGSGs. Based on its homology to other members of the α-scorpion toxin family, LmαTX3 most likely blocks receptor site 3, which is located on the extracellular loop of sodium channels which connects the S3 and S4 segments on domain IV. Site 3 toxins prevent a component of outward gating charge movement associated with channel inactivation, it is likely that they are able to slow inactivation by preventing the outward movement of the DIV S4 segment, hence making fast inactivation difficult and prolonging the action potential. In this sense, scorpion α-toxins can be considered gating-modifier toxins.

== Toxicity ==
Currently, there is no LmαTX3-specific knowledge of the toxic effect. Generally, scorpion α-toxins prolong the action potentials of excitable cells. These toxins can kill organisms by inducing paralysis and arrhythmia.
