= BmK NSPK =

Toxin BmK NSPK

Identifiers
- Organism: Mesobuthus martensii
- Symbol: ?
- UniProt: P0DUK8
Search for
- Structures: Swiss-model
- Domains: InterPro

BmK NSPK (Buthus martensii Karsch, Neurite-Stimulating Peptide targeting K_{v} channels) is a toxin isolated from the venom of the Chinese armor-tail scorpion (Mesobuthus martensii), which specifically targets voltage gated potassium channels (K_{v}), resulting in a direct inhibition of outward potassium current.

== Source ==
BmK NSPK is a neurotoxin isolated from the venom of the Chinese armor-tail scorpion (Mesobuthus martensii).

== Chemistry ==
BmK NSPK is a short-chain toxin that has a primary amino acid sequence of 38 amino acids and a molecular weight of 3962.2 Da.

BmK NSPK
Length	38 a.a.
Mass	3.9622 kDa
Primary sequence	VGKNVICIHS GQCLIPCIDA GMRFGICKNG ICDCTPKG
Uniprot	P0DUK8

The toxin has a cysteine-stabilized α-helix-β-sheet motif, containing one α-helix connected by disulfide bonds to two parallel β-sheets, which suggests that BmK NSPK belongs to the Csαβ potassium channel blockers.

In comparison with BmKTX (Buthus martensii kaliotoxin), which is a previously discovered Kv1.3 channel blocker, BmK NSPK showed 79% sequence homology. Furthermore, BmKTX and BmK NSPK also show structural similarities. In both toxins, the α-helixes contain Leu^{14} and Ala^{19/20} and the β-sheets show a similar folding pattern.

== Target and Mode of Action ==
Whole-cell patch-clamp recordings in mouse spinal cord neurons (SCNs) determined that BmK NSPK targets K_{v} channels. More specifically, when focussing on the similarities between BmK NSPK and BmKTX, K_{v}1.3 channels are expected to be the target of BmK NSPK. When BmK NSPK (300 nM) is introduced to the SCNs, outward potassium (I_{K}) currents are inhibited. As a result, the membrane potential will not repolarize. This is due to inhibition of the transient components (I_{A}) and sustained delayed rectifier components (I_{D}) of I_{K}, which are normally responsible for membrane repolarization.

BmK NSPK has additional effects in SCNs, possibly indirectly caused by the membrane depolarisation that is a consequence of the inhibition of outward potassium currents:

- Spontaneous calcium oscillations (SCOs) are increased in amplitude and frequency with the addition of BmK NSPK.
- When adding higher concentrations (3-300 nM) of BmK NSPK, the membrane of SCNs depolarizes.
- BmK NSPK modulates the release of Nerve Growth Factor in SCNs through the NGF/TrkA signaling pathway, leading to enhanced neurite outgrowth.
