= Cvill7 =

Scorpion toxin

Cvill7 peptide toxin is derived from the venom of Scorpion Centruroides villegasi and represents a member of the α-KTx2 subfamily of potassium channel-modulating toxins. Particularly, Cvill7 exerts a high affinity for Kv1.2, with weaker effects on Kv1.1 and Kv1.3. | colspan="2" |Cvill7 |- |Superfamily |Scorpion toxins |- |Family |α-KTx toxins |- |Subfamily |α-KTx2 |- |Amino acid sequence |TFINVKCTSPKQCLKPCKDLYGPHAGGKCMNGKCKCYNN |- |Molecular weight |4287 Da |}

== Etymology ==
Cvill7 is a peptide isolated from the venom of the scorpion Centruroides villegasi. The name is derived from the scorpion from which the peptide is isolated: ‘C’ for Centruroides, ‘vill’ for villegasi. Furthermore, it is the 7th identified peptide of the species.

== Sources ==
Due to favourable climate conditions, scorpion species are widely present in Mexico. Centruroides villegasi, also known as the Guerrero striped scorpion, is an arachnid endemic to Mexico, specifically the state of Guerrero.

== Chemistry ==
Cvill7 is composed of 39 amino acid residues, among which are six cysteines that enable disulfide bridge formation. The primary structure is: TFINVKCTSPKQCLKPCKDLYGPHAGGKCMNGKCKCYNN. The molecular mass is approximately 4287 Da.

Cvill7 belongs to the α-KTx 2 subfamily of toxins that modulate potassium channels (α-KTx 2.26). The α-KTx is one of seven families of scorpion toxins known to target potassium channels. Structurally, Cvill7 forms a CS α/β motif, consisting of a single α-helix connected to an antiparallel β-sheet stabilized by three disulfide bonds. The cysteine framework defining the group is conserved, as well as Lys28 and Tyr37. Specifically, Cvill7 has 95% similarity with toxin Ce1 (α-KTx 2.8), toxin Ce2 (α-KTx 2.9), and Ct28 (α-KTx 2.20); differing in 2 amino acids, indicating structural and functional similarities within this subfamily.

== Target ==
The α-KTx 2 subfamily is recognized for its role as blockers of voltage-gated potassium ion channels, specifically Kv1.1, Kv1.2, and Kv1.3. Cvill7 substantially blocks Kv1.2, with lesser blocking effects on Kv1.1 and Kv1.3. The toxin has an IC_{50} of about 16 pM with a Hill coefficient (H) of 1.3 for Kv1.2, and an IC_{50} of about 7.2 nM with H of 0.73 for Kv1.3, making it approximately 450 times more selective for Kv1.2 over Kv1.3.

== Mode of action ==
As a blocker of voltage-gated potassium ion channels, Cvill7 inhibits current flow through the channel. By formation of a dyad motif by the functional Lys28 and Tyr37, Cvill7 acts like other members of the family as a pore-blocking toxin. As a result, Kv1.2 currents are reduced.
