= Bukatoxin =

Scorpion toxin

Bukatoxin is an α-scorpion toxin found in the venom of the Chinese scorpion Buthus martensi Karsch. By blocking the inactivation of sodium ion channels, α-scorpion toxins prolong action potentials.

== Sources ==
Bukatoxin (short names: BukaTx or BKTx, alternative name: BuK-alpha-Tx) is a neurotoxin that is expressed and secreted by the venom gland of the scorpion Buthus martensii Karsch (Chinese Scorpion).

== Chemistry ==
Bukatoxin is a 65-residue peptide with the amino acid sequence VRDGYIADDKNCAYFCGRNAYCDEECIINGAESGYCQQAGVYGNACWCYKLPDKVPIRVSGECQQ, and has four disulfide bridges (Cys12-Cys63, Cys16-Cys36, Cys22-Cys46, Cys26-Cys48). The molecular weight of the neurotoxin is 7.2 kDa. Bukatoxin is a member of the 4C-C scorpion toxin superfamily. It can be further categorized as a polypeptide gating modifier toxin that belongs to the α-subfamily of scorpion neurotoxins.

== Target ==
Based on its homology to other members of the α-scorpion toxin family, bukatoxin most likely blocks the inactivation of neuronal sodium channels by binding to the neurotoxin receptor site 3 of sodium channels, thereby prolonging the action potential.

== Mode of action ==
The region between 52 and 56 in the amino acid sequence of bukatoxin, the ^{52}PDKVP^{56} loop, interacts with the neurotoxin receptor site 3, which is located on the extracellular loop of sodium channels that connects the S3 and S4 segments on the domain IV. Specifically, the tripeptide segment ^{53} DKV^{55}, which forms a surface loop that is available for binding, is suggested to play a significant role in the blocking of the inactivation of sodium channels. Other residues that could contribute to the binding of bukatoxin to the neurotoxin receptor site 3 of the sodium channels are the Val^{1} and Asp^{9}, which reside in the same surface loop. The binding of bukatoxin is thought to lead to blocking of conformational changes in the sodium channel, by preventing the outward movement of the IVS4 transmembrane segment during depolarization. As a result, inactivation of the channel becomes slower, leading to a broadened action potential.

== Effects ==
It has been shown that relaxation of carbachol-precontracted rat anococcygeous muscle occurs through the binding of bukatoxin to sodium channels, suggesting that bukatoxin has a muscle relaxation effect. Bukatoxin produces the effects by mediating the activation of nitrergic nerve fibers, most likely via an effect on presynaptic sodium channels. Muscle relaxation effects also arise in rabbit corpus cavernosum, but the mechanisms are not sodium channel-mediated and not completely elucidated yet.
