= BmKK2 toxin =

In molecular biology, the BmKK2 toxins are a family of scorpion toxins. They belong to the scorpion toxin subfamily alpha-KTx 14. They include a novel short-chain peptide from the Asian scorpion Mesobuthus martensii Karsch, a potassium channel blocker composed of 31 amino acid residues. The peptide adopts a classical alpha/beta-scaffold for alpha-KTxs. BmKK2 selectively inhibits the delayed rectifier K+ current, but does not affect the fast transient K+ current.

In comparison with typical short-chain scorpion toxins (e.g., CTX and NTX), the alpha helix is shorter and the beta-sheet element is smaller (each strand consists of only two residues). There is an alpha-mode binding between the toxin and the channels. It has a lower activity towards Kv channels and it is predicted that it may prefer a type of SK channel with a narrower entryway as a specific receptor.
