= Fasinumab =

Monoclonal antibody

Monoclonal antibody
- Type: ?
- Source: Human
- Target: HNGF

Clinical data
- ATC code: none

Identifiers
- CAS Number: 1190239-42-9
- ChemSpider: none
- UNII: 11T51Q3082
- KEGG: D10337

Chemical and physical data
- Formula: C_{6406}H_{9896}N_{1700}O_{2026}S_{46}
- Molar mass: 144618.27 g·mol^{−1}

Fasinumab is a human monoclonal antibody designed for the treatment of acute sciatic pain.

This drug was developed in collaboration by Teva Pharmaceutical Industries and Regeneron Pharmaceuticals.

It is currently at Phase III trials (NCT03245008, NCT02683239, and NCT03161093).

== See also ==
- List of investigational analgesics
