= Vixotrigine =

Analgesic drug under development

Clinical data
- Other names: Raxatrigine; CNV1014802; GSK-1014802; BIIB 074
- Routes of administration: By mouth
- ATC code: None

Identifiers
- IUPAC name: (2S,5R)-5-[4-[(2-fluorophenyl)methoxy]phenyl]pyrrolidine-2-carboxamide
- CAS Number: 934240-30-9 934240-35-4 (mesylate)
- PubChem CID: 16046068
- ChemSpider: 13174481
- UNII: QQS4J85K6Y
- KEGG: D11179
- CompTox Dashboard (EPA): DTXSID901031867

Chemical and physical data
- Formula: C_{18}H_{19}FN_{2}O_{2}
- Molar mass: 314.360 g·mol^{−1}
- 3D model (JSmol): Interactive image
- SMILES: C1CC(NC1C2=CC=C(C=C2)OCC3=CC=CC=C3F)C(=O)N
- InChI: InChI=1S/C18H19FN2O2/c19-15-4-2-1-3-13(15)11-23-14-7-5-12(6-8-14)16-9-10-17(21-16)18(20)22/h1-8,16-17,21H,9-11H2,(H2,20,22)/t16-,17+/m1/s1; Key:JESCETIFNOFKEU-SJORKVTESA-N

Vixotrigine (INN, USAN), formerly known as raxatrigine (INN, USAN), is an analgesic which is under development by Convergence Pharmaceuticals for the treatment of lumbosacral radiculopathy (sciatica) and trigeminal neuralgia (TGN). Vixotrigine was originally claimed to be a selective central Na_{v}1.3 blocker, but was subsequently redefined as a selective peripheral Na_{v}1.7 blocker. Following this, vixotrigine was redefined once again, as a non-selective voltage-gated sodium channel blocker. As of January 2018, it is in phase III clinical trials for trigeminal neuralgia and is in phase II clinical studies for erythromelalgia and neuropathic pain. It was previously under investigation for the treatment of bipolar disorder, but development for this indication was discontinued.

== See also ==
- List of investigational analgesics
- List of investigational bipolar disorder drugs
