= CR-4056 =

Investigational analgesic drug

Identifiers
- IUPAC name: 6-(1H-imidazol-1-yl)-2-phenylquinazoline
- CAS Number: 1004997-71-0
- PubChem CID: 24898732
- ChemSpider: 28669340
- UNII: W9SQ1X2NPZ

Chemical and physical data
- Formula: C_{17}H_{12}N_{4}
- Molar mass: 272.311 g·mol^{−1}
- 3D model (JSmol): Interactive image
- SMILES: C1(C2=CC=CC=C2)=NC=C3C=C(N4C=CN=C4)C=CC3=N1
- InChI: InChI=1S/C17H12N4/c1-2-4-13(5-3-1)17-19-11-14-10-15(6-7-16(14)20-17)21-9-8-18-12-21/h1-12H; Key:CSZGXYBGYFNSCO-UHFFFAOYSA-N

CR-4056 is an analgesic drug candidate with a novel mechanism of action, acting as a ligand for the imidazoline receptor I_{2}. It showed promising results in animal studies against various types of neuropathic pain, and has reached Phase II human clinical trials as a potential treatment for pain associated with osteoarthritis.

== See also ==
- List of investigational analgesics
