= Ralfinamide =

Investigational analgesic drug

Clinical data
- ATC code: None

Identifiers
- IUPAC name: N^{2}-{4-[(2-Fluorobenzyl)oxy]benzyl}-L-alaninamide
- CAS Number: 133865-88-0
- PubChem CID: 5745207
- ChemSpider: 4676525
- UNII: 3LPF0S0GVV
- ChEMBL: ChEMBL2107771
- CompTox Dashboard (EPA): DTXSID70158406
- ECHA InfoCard: 100.120.272

Chemical and physical data
- Formula: C_{17}H_{19}FN_{2}O_{2}
- Molar mass: 302.349 g·mol^{−1}
- 3D model (JSmol): Interactive image
- SMILES: C[C@@H](C(=O)N)NCc1ccc(cc1)OCc2ccccc2F
- InChI: InChI=1S/C17H19FN2O2/c1-12(17(19)21)20-10-13-6-8-15(9-7-13)22-11-14-4-2-3-5-16(14)18/h2-9,12,20H,10-11H2,1H3,(H2,19,21)/t12-/m0/s1; Key:BHJIBOFHEFDSAU-LBPRGKRZSA-N

Ralfinamide (INN; development codes NW-1029, FCE-26742A, and PNU-0154339E) is a multimodal drug which is under investigation by Newron Pharmaceuticals for the treatment of neuropathic pain and other pain conditions such as post-operative dental pain.

It has a relatively complex pharmacology, acting as a mixed voltage-gated sodium channel blocker (including Na_{v}1.7), N-type calcium channel blocker, noncompetitive NMDA receptor antagonist, and monoamine oxidase B inhibitor.

As of 2020, it was in phase III clinical trials. In 2010 it failed a phase II trial for lower back pain. Encouraging Phase II results have been announced for neuropathic pain.

== See also ==
- List of investigational analgesics
- Safinamide, different fluorine position
- Evenamide, structurally-related antipsychotic in development
- Lacosamide, used for partial-onset seizures and diabetic neuropathic pain
- Ziconotide, FDA approved peptide for chronic neuropathic pain
