= DSP-2230 =

Investigational analgesic drug

Clinical data
- Routes of administration: By mouth

Identifiers
- IUPAC name: (2S)-2-[[[3-cyclobutyl-5-(3,4,5-trifluorophenoxy)-3H-imidazo[4,5-b]pyridin-2-yl]methyl]amino]propanamide
- CAS Number: 1233231-30-5
- UNII: LSY2D22FBK
- ChEMBL: ChEMBL3545012

Chemical and physical data
- Formula: C_{20}H_{20}F_{3}N_{5}O_{2}
- Molar mass: 419.408 g·mol^{−1}
- 3D model (JSmol): Interactive image
- SMILES: FC1=CC(OC2=CC=C(N=C3CN([C@@H](C(N([H])[H])=O)C)[H])C(N3C4CCC4)=N2)=CC(F)=C1F
- InChI: InChI=1S/C20H20F3N5O2/c1-10(19(24)29)25-9-16-26-15-5-6-17(27-20(15)28(16)11-3-2-4-11)30-12-7-13(21)18(23)14(22)8-12/h5-8,10-11,25H,2-4,9H2,1H3,(H2,24,29)/t10-/m1/s1; Key:HHXCJIMPEJSJTG-SNVBAGLBSA-N

DSP-2230 is a selective small-molecule Na_{v}1.7 and Na_{v}1.8 voltage-gated sodium channel blocker which is under development by Dainippon Sumitomo Pharma for the treatment of neuropathic pain. As of June 2014, it is in phase I/phase II clinical trials.

== See also ==
- List of investigational analgesics
