= PF-05089771 =

Investigational analgesic drug

Legal status
- Legal status: US: Investigational New Drug

Identifiers
- IUPAC name: 4-[2-(3-Amino-1H-pyrazol-4-yl)-4-chlorophenoxy]-5-chloro-2-fluoro-N-(1,3-thiazol-4-yl)benzene-1-sulfonamide
- CAS Number: 1235403-62-9
- PubChem CID: 46840946
- ChemSpider: 29411106
- UNII: 25U4N985O2
- ChEMBL: ChEMBL2325014
- CompTox Dashboard (EPA): DTXSID301336085

Chemical and physical data
- Formula: C_{18}H_{12}Cl_{2}FN_{5}O_{3}S_{2}
- Molar mass: 500.34 g·mol^{−1}
- 3D model (JSmol): Interactive image
- SMILES: C1=CC(=C(C=C1Cl)C2=C(NN=C2)N)OC3=CC(=C(C=C3Cl)S(=O)(=O)NC4=CSC=N4)F
- InChI: InChI=1S/C18H12Cl2FN5O3S2/c19-9-1-2-14(10(3-9)11-6-24-25-18(11)22)29-15-5-13(21)16(4-12(15)20)31(27,28)26-17-7-30-8-23-17/h1-8,26H,(H3,22,24,25); Key:ZYSCOUXLBXGGIM-UHFFFAOYSA-N

PF-05089771 is a selective, small-molecule Na_{v}1.7 and Na_{v}1.8 voltage-gated sodium channel blocker under development by Pfizer as a novel analgesic. As of June 2014, it has completed phase II clinical trials for wisdom tooth removal and primary erythromelalgia.

== See also ==
- List of investigational analgesics
