= Mavatrep =

Investigational analgesic drug

Clinical data
- Other names: JNJ-39439335

Identifiers
- IUPAC name: 2-[2-[2-[(E)-2-[4-(Trifluoromethyl)phenyl]ethenyl]-3H-benzimidazol-5-yl]phenyl]propan-2-ol
- CAS Number: 956274-94-5
- PubChem CID: 17751090
- DrugBank: DB12875
- ChemSpider: 29271895
- UNII: F197218T99
- KEGG: D10370
- ChEMBL: ChEMBL2364618
- CompTox Dashboard (EPA): DTXSID90241905

Chemical and physical data
- Formula: C_{25}H_{21}F_{3}N_{2}O
- Molar mass: 422.451 g·mol^{−1}
- 3D model (JSmol): Interactive image
- SMILES: CC(C)(C1=CC=CC=C1C2=CC3=C(C=C2)N=C(N3)/C=C/C4=CC=C(C=C4)C(F)(F)F)O
- InChI: InChI=1S/C25H21F3N2O/c1-24(2,31)20-6-4-3-5-19(20)17-10-13-21-22(15-17)30-23(29-21)14-9-16-7-11-18(12-8-16)25(26,27)28/h3-15,31H,1-2H3,(H,29,30)/b14-9+; Key:ORDHXXHTBUZRCN-NTEUORMPSA-N

Mavatrep (JNJ‐39439335) is a TRPV1 receptor selective competitive antagonist. It is an investigational analgesic that may be a potential treatment for pain and/or inflammation.

Phase I trials have been completed in healthy Japanese and Caucasian volunteers.

Potential common adverse effects include thermohypoesthesia, chills, feeling cold, and feeling hot.

== Pharmacokinetics ==
When administered orally once a day, mavatrep reached steady-state in healthy volunteers in approximately 14 days. It has a relatively long half-life between 68 and 101 hours in Japanese subjects and between 82 and 130 hours in Caucasian subjects.

Mavatrep is largely eliminated non-renally. Mavatrep appears to be metabolized into two primary metabolites which are also eliminated nonrenally.

== See also ==
- List of investigational analgesics
