= BmP02 =

Scorpion toxin

BmP02, ⍺-KTx9.1, or Bmkk(6)

Identifiers
- Organism: Buthus martensi Karsch
- Symbol: KAX91_MESMA
- RefSeq (Prot): 1DU9_A
- UniProt: Q9NJP7
Search for
- Structures: Swiss-model
- Domains: InterPro

BmP02, also known as α-KTx 9.1 or Bmkk(6), is a toxin from the Buthus martensi Karsch (BmK) scorpion. The toxin acts on potassium channels, blocking Kv1.3 and slowing the deactivation of Kv4.2. BmP02 is not toxic to humans or mice.

== Source and etymology ==
The BmP02 toxin is a component of the venom of the Buthus martensi Karsch scorpion, making up 0.09% of its dry venom mass . This scorpion species is native to northwestern China, Mongolia, and Korea. BmP02 is also known as ⍺-KTx9.1 or Bmkk(6). The Bm acronym derives from the initials of Buthus martensi scorpion species. P02 refers to the fact that BmP02 is one of the short-chain peptide toxins found in Buthus Martensi Karsch's crude venom.

== Structure ==
BmP02 is a member of the ⍺-KTx toxin family. KTx's are toxins from the scorpion. Members of the ⍺ subfamily typically consist of short peptides, approximately 28-42 amino acids in length. The majority of them contain three or four disulfide bridges Most α-KTx toxins act on potassium channels. They bind to the channel using a dyad-motif centered on a lysine in the β strand. Then they use a hydrophobic residue to block the channel's activity. Despite not containing this dyad-motif, BmP02 is still able to block multiple types of potassium channels.

Bmp02 is a 28 amino acid toxin which is stabilized by 3 disulphide bonds. Its mass is 2950 Da. Although BmP02 is a member of the Ktx family it lacks the active dyad-motif which is common to this family. BmP02 is among the shorter toxins in the Buthus martensi venom. The untranslated cDNA of BmP02 consists of three parts: a 5′ untranslated region (UTR), an open reading frame (ORF) and a 3′ UTR. Its precursor consists of 56 amino acids. In the functional toxin, only 28 amino acids remain.

== Homology ==
Structurally, BmP02 is very similar to Kbot1 (Buthus occitanus tunetanus, 93% similar) and to BmP03 (BmK, 96% ). It also shares similarity with BmP01 (BmK, 46%) and BmP05 (BmK) but it has a different mode of action. BmP05 acts blocks the Ca2+-activated K+ channel (SKCa), whereas BmP02 acts on potassium channels, but is not able to exert a pharmacological effect on the SKCa channels.

== Targets ==
BmP02 targets potassium channels. Its activity has been shown in Kv1.1-Kv1.3, Kv4.2, Shaker-IR (Inactivation Removed) type, and SKCa. BmP02 blocks Kv1.1-Kv1.3 with nanomolar affinity but has no effect on Kv1.4 isoform of the channel. Kv1.3 (IC50 = 7 ± 0.6 nm) and Kv4.2 (EC50 = 845 nM) channels are the most sensitive targets to this toxin.

=== SKCa ===
SKCa channel can be found in the brain. It has been experimentally shown that BmP02 can bind to SKCa with micromolar affinity. However, unlike BmP05, BmP02 does not generate toxic effects in mice. This loss of toxicity has been ascribed to the differential coupling of the disulfide bridge between BmP05 and BmP02. This lowers the affinity of BmP02 for the SKCa channel and removes its pharmacological effect. Furthermore, it has been shown that after intracerebroventricular injection in mice it could very well compete to binding to the SKCa channel with the toxin iodinated apamin.

=== Kv1.3 ===
Kv1.3 channels can be found in T-lymphocytes and macrophages. The effect of BmP02 on Kv1.3 channels has been validated in HEK293T cells. BmP02 acts on the Kv1.3 channel by blocking it, which does not affect Kv1.3's voltage-gating properties. BmP02 binds on two negatively charged aspartate residues (D421 and D422) in the turret of the channel. Three positively charged residues (His9, Lys11 and Lys13) within the large β turn of the toxin facilitate this interaction. After binding, the Lys11 associated side chain will block the central pore. Other residues that have been found to be important for BmP02's action are Asp16 on the toxin which interacts with the His401 residue the channel. Blocking of BmP02 on Kv1.3 is state-dependent, the toxin preferentially binds to and blocks the channel in its closed state.

=== Transient outward K+ channel (Ito) ===
BmP02 blocks the Ito in adult rat ventricular myocytes by physically obstructing the channel's pore while leaving the channel's gating properties intact. The toxin-channel interface here is mediated by electrostatic interactions between positively charged residues on the toxin and negatively charged residues in the pore of the channel. The Ik and Ikl1 were not affected in guinea pig ventricular myocytes .

=== Kv4.2 ===
BmP02 delays the inactivation of Kv4.2. The Kv 4.2 channel partially mediates the transient outward potassium current (Ito) in adult rat ventricular myocytes. Three negative amino acids (A359, K347, K353) within the pore of Kv4.2 channels and positive residues E4/E5 and D20/D21 on the toxin facilitate the interaction between the channel and the toxin. BmP02 delays Kv4.2 inactivation, which would be expected to cause an increase in the Ito. However, in vitro experiments on adult rat ventricular myocytes showed that BmP02 blocks the Ito channel. As a solution it has been proposed that Kv1.3 is involved in the Ito

== Toxicity ==
BmP02 is not toxic to humans and gives only minor and temporary symptoms in mice. It is not possible to experimentally establish an LD_{50}.
