= Fulranumab =

Chemical compound

Monoclonal antibody
- Type: Whole antibody
- Source: Human
- Target: NGF

Clinical data
- ATC code: none

Identifiers
- CAS Number: 902141-80-4
- ChemSpider: none
- UNII: 0E986JU40I
- KEGG: D09907

Chemical and physical data
- Formula: C_{6446}H_{9930}N_{1718}O_{2018}S_{50}
- Molar mass: 145385.35 g·mol^{−1}

Fulranumab is a monoclonal antibody against nerve growth factor. It was designed for the treatment of pain.

Johnson & Johnson licensed the drug from Amgen in a deal valued at around US$425 million in 2008. In 2016 Johnson & Johnson discontinued all phase III trials of fulranumab and returned the rights to its originator. The company said the decision was based on "strategic portfolio prioritisation and was not based on any emerging safety concerns from the phase III clinical studies with fulranumab" in osteoarthritic pain.

== See also ==
- List of investigational analgesics
