= Sodium channel blocker =

Several medications which disrupt the movement of Na+ ions

Sodium channel blockers are drugs which impair the conduction of sodium ions (Na^{+}) through sodium channels.

== Extracellular ==
The following naturally-produced substances block sodium channels by binding to and occluding the extracellular pore opening of the channel:

- Alkaloids:
  - Saxitoxin (STX)
  - Neosaxitoxin (NSTX)
  - Tetrodotoxin (TTX)

== Intracellular ==
Drugs which block sodium channels by blocking from the intracellular side of the channel include:

- Local anesthetics: lidocaine
- Class I antiarrhythmic agents
- Various anticonvulsants: phenytoin, oxcarbazepine (derivative of carbamazepine)

== Unknown mechanism ==
- Calcium has been shown to block sodium channels which explains the effects of hypercalcemia and hypocalcemia.
- Lamotrigine is known to block sodium channels but it is not known whether it is extracellular or intracellular.
- Cannabidiol (CBD) has been shown to cause inhibitory effects on sodium currents. This voltage-dependent inhibition is non-selective in nature. The current literature suggests that cannabidiol inhibits sodium currents primarily through altering the biophysical properties of cell membrane, promoting the inactivated conformation of sodium channels.
- Other nonpsychotomimetic phytocannabinoids, including cannabigerol (CBG) and cannabinol (CBN), have also been shown to inhibit the nociceptor sodium channel Nav1.8, supporting a potential peripheral analgesic mechanism.

== Antiarrhythmic ==
Sodium channel blockers are used in the treatment of cardiac arrhythmia. They are classified as "Type I" in the Vaughan Williams classification.

Class I antiarrhythmic agents interfere with the (Na^{+}) channel. Class I agents are grouped by their effect on the Na^{+} channel, and by their effect on cardiac action potentials. Class I agents are called Membrane Stabilizing Agents. 'Stabilizing' refers to the decrease of excitogenicity of the plasma membrane affected by these agents. A few class II agents, propranolol for example, also have a membrane stabilizing effect.

=== Class Ia agents ===
Class Ia agent decreasing V_{max}, thereby increasing action potential duration.

Class Ia agents block the fast sodium channel, which depresses the phase 0 depolarization (i.e. reduces V_{max}), which prolongs the action potential duration by slowing conduction. Agents in this class also cause decreased conductivity and increased refractoriness.

Indications for Class Ia agents are supraventricular tachycardia, ventricular tachycardia, symptomatic ventricular premature beats, and prevention of ventricular fibrillation.

Procainamide can be used to treat atrial fibrillation in the setting of Wolff–Parkinson–White syndrome, and to treat wide complex hemodynamically stable tachycardias. Oral procainamide is no longer being manufactured in the US, but intravenous formulations are still available.

While procainamide and quinidine may be used in the conversion of atrial fibrillation to normal sinus rhythm, they should only be used in conjunction with an AV node blocking agent such as digoxin or verapamil, or a beta blocker, because procainamide and quinidine can increase the conduction through the AV node and may cause 1:1 conduction of atrial fibrillation, causing an increase in the ventricular rate.

Class Ia agents include quinidine, procainamide and disopyramide.

=== Class Ib agents ===
Effect of class Ib antiarrhythmic agents on the cardiac action potential.

Class Ib antiarrhythmic agents are sodium channel blockers. They have fast onset and offset kinetics, meaning that they have little or no effect at slower heart rates, and more effects at faster heart rates. Class Ib agents shorten the action potential duration and reduce refractoriness. These agents will decrease V_{max} in partially depolarized cells with fast response action potentials. They either do not change the action potential duration, or they may decrease the action potential duration. Class Ib drugs tend to be more specific for voltage gated Na channels than Ia. Lidocaine in particular is highly frequency dependent, in that it has more activity with increasing heart rates. This is because lidocaine selectively blocks Na channels in their open and inactive states and has little binding capability in the resting state.

Class Ib agents are indicated for the treatment of ventricular tachycardia and symptomatic premature ventricular beats, and prevention of ventricular fibrillation.

Class Ib agents include lidocaine, mexiletine, tocainide, and phenytoin.

=== Class Ic agents ===
Effect of class Ic antiarrhythmic agent on cardiac action potential.

Class Ic antiarrhythmic agents markedly depress the phase 0 depolarization (decreasing V_{max}). They decrease conductivity, but have a minimal effect on the action potential duration. Of the sodium channel blocking antiarrhythmic agents (the class I antiarrhythmic agents), the class Ic agents have the most potent sodium channel blocking effects.

Class Ic agents are indicated for supraventricular arrhythmias (i.e. atrial fibrillation) and as a last line treatment for refractory life-threatening ventricular tachycardia or ventricular fibrillation. These agents are potentially pro-arrhythmic, especially in settings of structural heart disease (e.g. post-myocardial infarction), and are contraindicated in such settings.

Class Ic agents include encainide, flecainide, moricizine, and propafenone. Encainide is not available in the United States.

== Other uses ==
Sodium channel blockers are also used as local anesthetics and anticonvulsants.

Sodium channel blockers have been proposed for use in the treatment of cystic fibrosis, but current evidence is mixed.

It has been suggested that the analgesic effects of some antidepressants may be mediated in part via sodium channel blockade.

Voltage-gated sodium channel blockers are used as insecticides, comprising Insecticide Resistance Action Committee (IRAC) mechanism of action group 22. As of March 2020 these are two, indoxacarb (22A, the oxadiazines) and metaflumizone (22B, the semicarbazones).

== Future prospects ==
Selective blockers of Na_{v}1.7 and Na_{v}1.8 voltage-gated sodium channels, such as CNV1014802 and Funapide, are being investigated as novel analgesics.

== See also ==
- Sodium channel opener
