= BmKAEP =

Scorpion neurotoxin

BmKAEP (or anti-epilepsy peptide) is a neurotoxin from the venom of the Manchurian scorpion (Mesobuthus martensii). It is a β-toxin, which shift the activation voltage of sodium channels towards more negative potentials.

== Etymology ==
BmK is the abbreviation for Buthus martensi Karsch, an old name for the scorpion that is the source of BmKAEP; AEP is an abbreviation for anti-epilepsy peptide. At the NCBI Protein Database, the full name of this peptide is listed as "Toxin BmKAEP".

== Sources ==
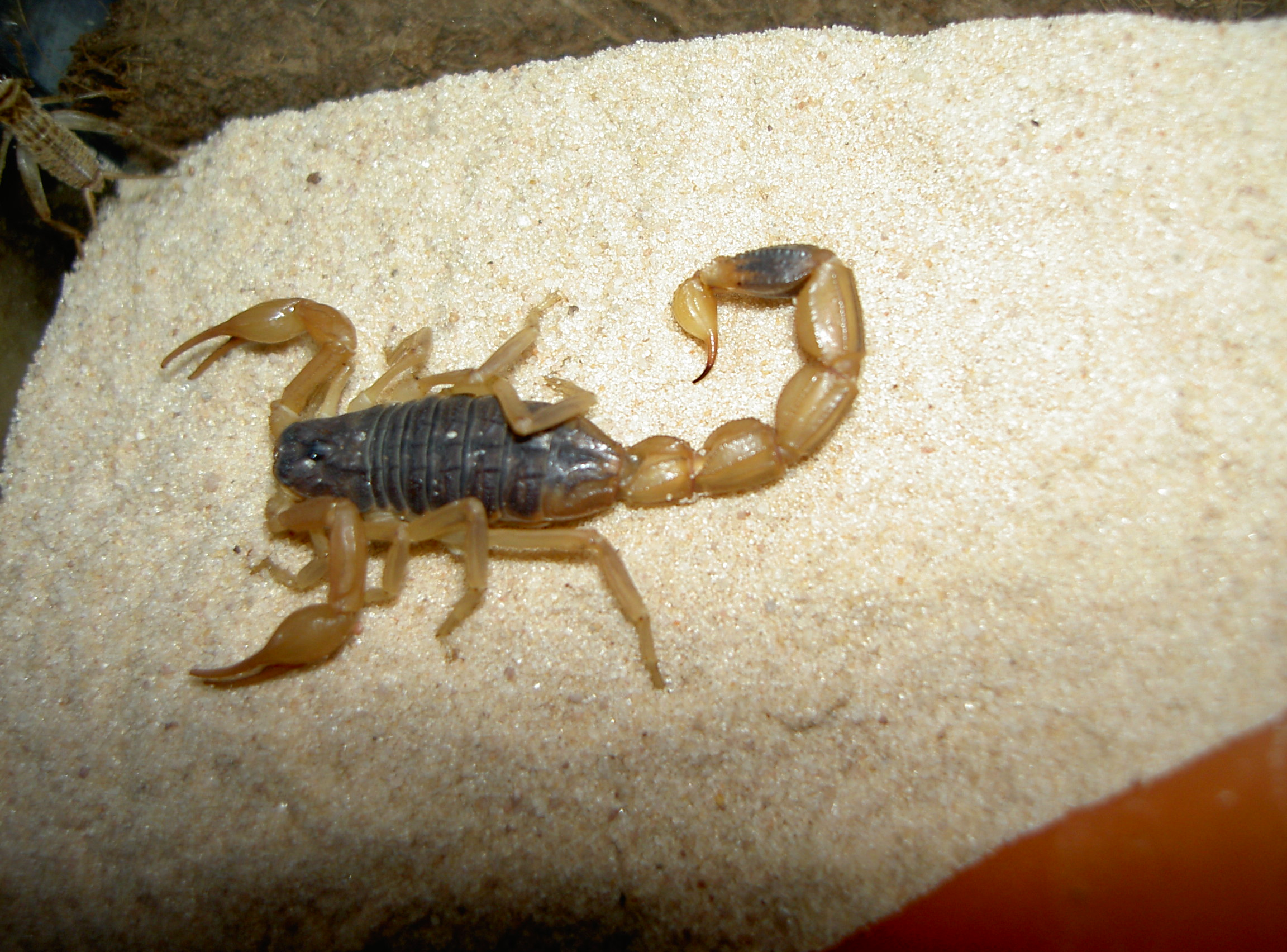
Manchurian scorpion (Mesobuthus martensii)

BmKAEP is one of the components of Mesobuthus martensii's venom, a well-known scorpion belonging to the family Buthidae, which is found distributed throughout Eastern Asia and China.

== Chemistry ==
BmKAEP is an inhibitory β-toxin and thus, a Na^{+} channel inhibitor. As with other mammal and insect toxins, BmKAEP is classified according to species and mechanism of action.

BmKAEP is a 61-amino-acid protein derived from an 85-amino-acid precursor. The mature protein contains 8 cysteine residues that establish 4 disulfide bridges (4C-C). Despite its high homology with other depressant toxins, BmKAEP differs from them at residues 6, 7 and 39, which is thought to be important in determining its unique function. Its lysine residue, at position 51, also has a special feature: it interacts with mammalian Na^{+} channels.

BmKAEP primary sequence

01 mklflllvis asmlidglvn adgyirgsng
31 ckvsclwgne gcnkeckafg ayygycwtwg
61 lacwceglpd dktwksesnt cggkk

== Target and Mode of Action ==
Because of its sequence homology with other β-toxins, BmKAEP is predicted to bind to site 4 (S4) of voltage-gated Na^{+} channels, at domains I, III and IV. Its interaction with the S4 loop causes the loop to be maintained at the outward activated position. Therefore, activation of the Na^{+} channels shifts towards more negative values, enhancing the channel's activation and promoting spontaneous and repetitive firing. Subsequently, the sodium current amplitude decreases, due to the membrane potential depolarization, thus suppressing action potentials.

== Toxicity ==
BmK venom induces a transient phase of contraction followed by a slow progressive flaccid paralysis in insect larvae. However, since it requires a high dosage to be effective, its toxicity is weak, both in insects and mammals.

Toxicity parameters
LD_{50}	2,4 mg/kg (mice; intraperitoneal injection)
MLD (minimum lethal dose)	0,074 mg/kg (mice; Intracerebroventricular injection)
CPU (concentration paralysis unit)	1 μg/body (larvae)
NOAEL (No observed adverse effect)	<2 μg (insects); <20 μg (mice)

== Therapeutic use ==
Though the exact mechanism of its anti-epilepsy effect is not clear, several studies have shown that BmKAEP can inhibit coriaria lactone-induced epilepsy in rats by prolonging the latent epilepsy period, relieving the degree of seizures and shortening its average duration, at a pharmacological dosage of only 0.057 μg/g.

Mesobuthus martensii, especially its tail, has been used in Chinese traditional medicine to treat several neuronal diseases, such as several types of paralysis, apoplexy and epilepsy.
