= Funapide =

Analgesic drug under development

Clinical data
- Routes of administration: By mouth, topical
- ATC code: None

Identifiers
- IUPAC name: (7S)-1'-[[5-(trifluoromethyl)furan-2-yl]methyl]spiro[6H-furo[2,3-f][1,3]benzodioxole-7,3'-indole]-2'-one
- CAS Number: 1259933-16-8
- PubChem CID: 49836093
- ChemSpider: 34500834
- UNII: A5595LHJ2L
- KEGG: D11156

Chemical and physical data
- Formula: C_{22}H_{14}F_{3}NO_{5}
- Molar mass: 429.351 g·mol^{−1}
- 3D model (JSmol): Interactive image
- SMILES: C1C2(C3=CC=CC=C3N(C2=O)CC4=CC=C(O4)C(F)(F)F)C5=CC6=C(C=C5O1)OCO6
- InChI: InChI=1S/C22H14F3NO5/c23-22(24,25)19-6-5-12(31-19)9-26-15-4-2-1-3-13(15)21(20(26)27)10-28-16-8-18-17(7-14(16)21)29-11-30-18/h1-8H,9-11H2/t21-/m0/s1; Key:NEBUOXBYNAHKFV-NRFANRHFSA-N

Funapide (INN; former developmental codes TV-45070 and XEN402) is a novel analgesic under development by Xenon Pharmaceuticals (formerly in partnership with Teva Pharmaceutical Industries) for the treatment of a variety of chronic pain conditions, including osteoarthritis, neuropathic pain, postherpetic neuralgia, and erythromelalgia, as well as dental pain. It acts as a small-molecule Na_{v}1.7 and Na_{v}1.8 voltage-gated sodium channel blocker. Funapide was evaluated in humans in both oral and topical formulations, and as of July 2014, had reached phase IIb clinical trials. Development of the drug was discontinued in 2022.

== See also ==
- List of investigational analgesics
