= Sodium channel opener =

Medication group

A sodium channel opener is a type of drug which facilitates ion transmission through sodium channels.

Examples include natural toxins, such as aconitine, veratridine, grayanotoxin, pyrethrin I, batrachotoxin, robustoxin, palytoxins and ciguatoxins.

== See also ==
- Sodium channel blocker
