= LqhIT2 =

Scorpion depressant β-toxin

LqhIT2 is a long-chain scorpion depressant β-toxin derived from Leiurus quinquestriatus hebraeus. It targets insect voltage-gated sodium channels (Na_{v}s) and shifts the voltage dependence of channel activation to a more negative membrane potential.

LqhIT2
Organism	Leiurus quinquestriatus hebraeus
Family	Scorpion depressant β-toxin
Uniprot	Q26292
Molecular mass	5 kDa
Isoelectric point	6.4
mRNA sequence	ENA

== Family and structure ==
LqhIT2 belongs to the family of long chain scorpion depressant β-toxins. The protein can be produced using E. coli.

The molecular mass of LqhIT2 is approximately 5 kDa, with an isoelectric point of 6.4. LqhIT2 is a relatively small protein, containing only 61 amino acids. The protein is a long-chain toxin, which means that it is made up of an α-helix that is packed against a three-stranded antiparallel β-sheets. This construction is stabilized by a total of four cysteine disulfide bridges.

The α-helix and β-sheets make up the core globule. This core globule is connected to the NC-globule, which is encompassed by the N-groove on one side and the C-groove on the other side. The N-groove is important for the potency, activity, and selectivity of LqhIT2.

There are a few amino-acids that are thought to be of importance for the toxicity of LqhIT2: residues Asn 58 and Gly 61 at the C-terminus, and Asp 8, Lys11, and Lys 26 of its adjacent bioactive surface.

== Target ==
Voltage dependent sodium channels detect a change in membrane potential with the voltage sensor S3-S4. When the change in voltage reaches the threshold for an action potential, the ion channel opens and sodium ions diffuse into the cell. The general target for scorpion β-toxins is the receptor site 4 of Na_{v}s. Scorpion depressant β-scorpion toxins have a high affinity for Na_{v}s of insects.

LqhIT2 toxin possesses two non-interacting binding sites: a high-affinity and low-capacity binding site, as well as a low-affinity and high-capacity binding site. LqhIT2 binds to receptor site 4 of the voltage-gated sodium channel, more specifically to loop D2/D3-S. Additionally, the toxin binds non-specifically to the phospholipid bilayer and thus partitions into the cell membrane. However, this binding occurs ten times more slowly than the binding to receptor site 4.

== Mode of action ==
After binding to receptor site 4 of the Na_{v}s, the activation threshold of the channel shifts to a more hyperpolarized membrane potential. This shift in activation threshold is due to a two-step process.

First, the toxin binds to the S3/S4 binding site of the Na_{v}s channel irrespective of the channels current state. Once the channel switches to the open state, the toxin traps the activation sensor in its current position thus making the ion channel easier to open. The channel is now in a preactivated state . By switching the channel into a preactivated state, LqhIT2 toxin increases the rate of spontaneous neurotransmitter release.

Next, the increased rate of transmitter is followed by a reduction of synaptic potentials with eventually a block of neuromuscular transmission. Within 3 minutes after application, the toxin decreases the amplitudes of synaptic signals that are based on Na_{v}s activity. This leads to a gradual decrease in amplitudes of action potentials. After 4 minutes, the cell is in a permanent state of depolarization, which prevents the generation of further action potentials.

== Toxicity ==
Injection of 50 ng LqhIT2 of per 100 mg body weight is sufficient to paralyze blowfly larvae. This injection causes a short transient muscle contraction a few seconds after application. However, the threshold to increase membrane potential then decreases until the muscle is not electrically excitable anymore. The contraction is followed by flaccid paralysis, which lasts up to five minutes after injection. The initial increased sensitivity of Na_{v}s channels as well as the consequential release of neurotransmitter correlates with the brief contractile phase in intact larvae. The reduction of synaptic potentials that follows might account for the onset of flaccid paralysis.

The toxin does not appear to be toxic for mammals such as mice
