= SCN11A =

Protein-coding gene in the species Homo sapiens

Identifiers
- Aliases: SCN11A, FEPS3, HSAN7, NAV1.9, NaN, PN5, SCN12A, SNS-2, sodium voltage-gated channel alpha subunit 11
- External IDs: OMIM: 604385; MGI: 1345149; GeneCards: SCN11A

Gene location (Human)
Chr.	Chromosome 3 (human)
Band	3p22.2	Start	38,845,764 bp
Band	3p22.2	End	39,052,157 bp

Gene location (Mouse)
Chr.	Chromosome 9 (mouse)
Band	9 F3|9 71.33 cM	Start	119,582,825 bp
Band	9 F3|9 71.33 cM	End	119,654,522 bp
RNA expression pattern
Bgee	Human / Mouse (ortholog); Top expressed in: buccal mucosa cell; spinal ganglia; testicle; trigeminal ganglion; gonad; left testis; right testis; sural nerve; spleen; ventricular zone / Top expressed in: lumbar spinal ganglion; membrana granulosa of ovarian follicle; spermatogonium; motor neuron; embryo; saccule; pituitary gland; Paneth cell; lens; oocyte; More reference expression data
BioGPS	n/a
Gene ontology
Molecular function	ion channel activity; sodium channel activity; voltage-gated ion channel activity; voltage-gated sodium channel activity
Cellular component	voltage-gated sodium channel complex; integral component of membrane; extracellular exosome; membrane; plasma membrane; axon; C-fiber
Biological process	regulation of ion transmembrane transport; membrane depolarization during action potential; ion transport; sodium ion transmembrane transport; neuronal action potential; transmembrane transport; ion transmembrane transport; sodium ion transport; regulation of postsynaptic membrane potential; regulation of sensory perception of pain; transport
Sources:Amigo / QuickGO
Orthologs
Databases	NCBI: entry; OMA: entry
Species	Human	Mouse
Entrez	11280	24046
Ensembl	ENSG00000168356	ENSMUSG00000034115
UniProt	Q9UI33	Q9R053
RefSeq (mRNA)	NM_001287223; NM_014139; NM_001349253	NM_011887
RefSeq (protein)	NP_054858; NP_001336182	NP_036017
Location (UCSC)	Chr 3: 38.85 – 39.05 Mb	Chr 9: 119.58 – 119.65 Mb
PubMed search
- Wikidata
View/Edit Human	View/Edit Mouse

Sodium channel, voltage-gated, type XI, alpha subunit also known as SCN11A or Na_{v}1.9 is a voltage-gated sodium ion channel protein which is encoded by the SCN11A gene on chromosome 3 in humans. Like Na_{v}1.7 and Na_{v}1.8, Na_{v}1.9 plays a role in pain perception. This channel is largely expressed in small-diameter nociceptors of the dorsal root ganglion and trigeminal ganglion neurons, but is also found in intrinsic myenteric neurons.

== Function ==
Voltage-gated sodium channels are membrane protein complexes that play a fundamental role in the rising phase of the action potential in most excitable cells. Alpha subunits, such as SCN11A, mediate voltage-dependent gating and conductance, while auxiliary beta subunits regulate the kinetic properties of the channel and facilitate membrane localization of the complex. Aberrant expression patterns or mutations of alpha subunits underlie a number of disorders. Each alpha subunit consists of 4 domains connected by 3 intracellular loops; each domain consists of 6 transmembrane segments and intra- and extracellular linkers. The 4th transmembrane segment of each domain is the voltage-sensing region of the channel. Following depolarization of the cell, voltage-gated sodium channels become inactivated through a change in conformation in which the 4th segments in each domain move into the pore region in response to the highly positive voltage expressed at the peak of the action potential. This effectively blocks the Na^{+} pore and prevents further influx of Na^{+}, therefore preventing further depolarization. Similarly, when the cell reaches its minimum (most negative) voltage during hyperpolarization, the 4th segments respond by moving outward, thus reopening the pore and allowing Na^{+} to flow into the cell.

Na_{v}1.9 is known to play a role in nociception, having been linked to the perception of inflammatory, neuropathic, and cold-related pain. It does this primarily through its ability to lower the threshold potential of the neuron, allowing for an increase in action potential firing that leads to hyperexcitability of the neuron and increased pain perception. Because of this role in altering the threshold potential, Na_{v}1.9 is considered a threshold channel. Though most sodium channels are blocked by tetrodotoxin, Na_{v}1.9 is tetrodotoxin-resistant due to the presence of serine on an extracellular linker that plays a role in the selectivity of the pore for Na^{+}. This property is found in similar channels, namely Na_{v}1.8, and has been associated with slower channel kinetics than the tetrodotoxin-sensitive sodium channels. In Na_{v}1.9, this is mostly associated with the slower speed at which channel inactivation occurs.

== Animal models of pain ==
Both Na_{v}1.8 and Na_{v}1.9 have been shown to play a role in bone cancer associated pain using a rat model of bone cancer. The dorsal root ganglion of lumbar 4-5 of rats with bone cancer were shown to have up-regulation of Na_{v}1.8 and Na_{v}1.9 mRNA expression as well as an increase in total number of these alpha subunits. These results suggest that tetrodotoxin-resistant voltage gated sodium channels are involved in the development and maintenance of bone cancer pain.

The role of Na_{v}1.9 in chronic inflammatory joint pain has been demonstrated in rat models of chronic inflammatory knee pain. Expression of Na_{v}1.9 in the afferent neurons of the dorsal root ganglion was found to be elevated as many as four weeks after the onset of the inflammatory pain. These results indicated that this alpha subunit plays some role in the maintenance of chronic inflammatory pain.

== Clinical significance ==
=== Gain-of-function mutations ===
There are currently many known gain-of-function mutations in the human SCN11A gene that are associated with various pain abnormalities. The majority of these mutations lead to the experience of episodic pain, mainly in the joints of the extremities. In some of these mutants, the pain symptoms began in early childhood and diminished somewhat with age, but some of the mutants were asymptomatic until later in adulthood. Many of these conditions are also accompanied by gastrointestinal disturbances such as constipation and diarrhea. Additionally, one gain-of-function mutation on SCN11A has been linked with a congenital inability to experience pain.

=== As a drug target for pain relief ===
The role of Na_{v}1.9 in inflammatory and neuropathic pain has made it a potential drug target for pain relief. It is thought that a drug that targets Na_{v}1.9 could be used to decrease pain effectively while avoiding the many side effects associated with other high-strength analgesics. Topical menthol blocks both Na_{v}1.8 and Na_{v}1.9 channels in the dorsal root ganglion. Menthol inhibits action potentials by dampening the Na^{+} channel activity without affecting normal neural activity in the affected area. Na_{v}1.9 has also been proposed as a target to treat oxaliplatin induced cold-associated pain side effects.
