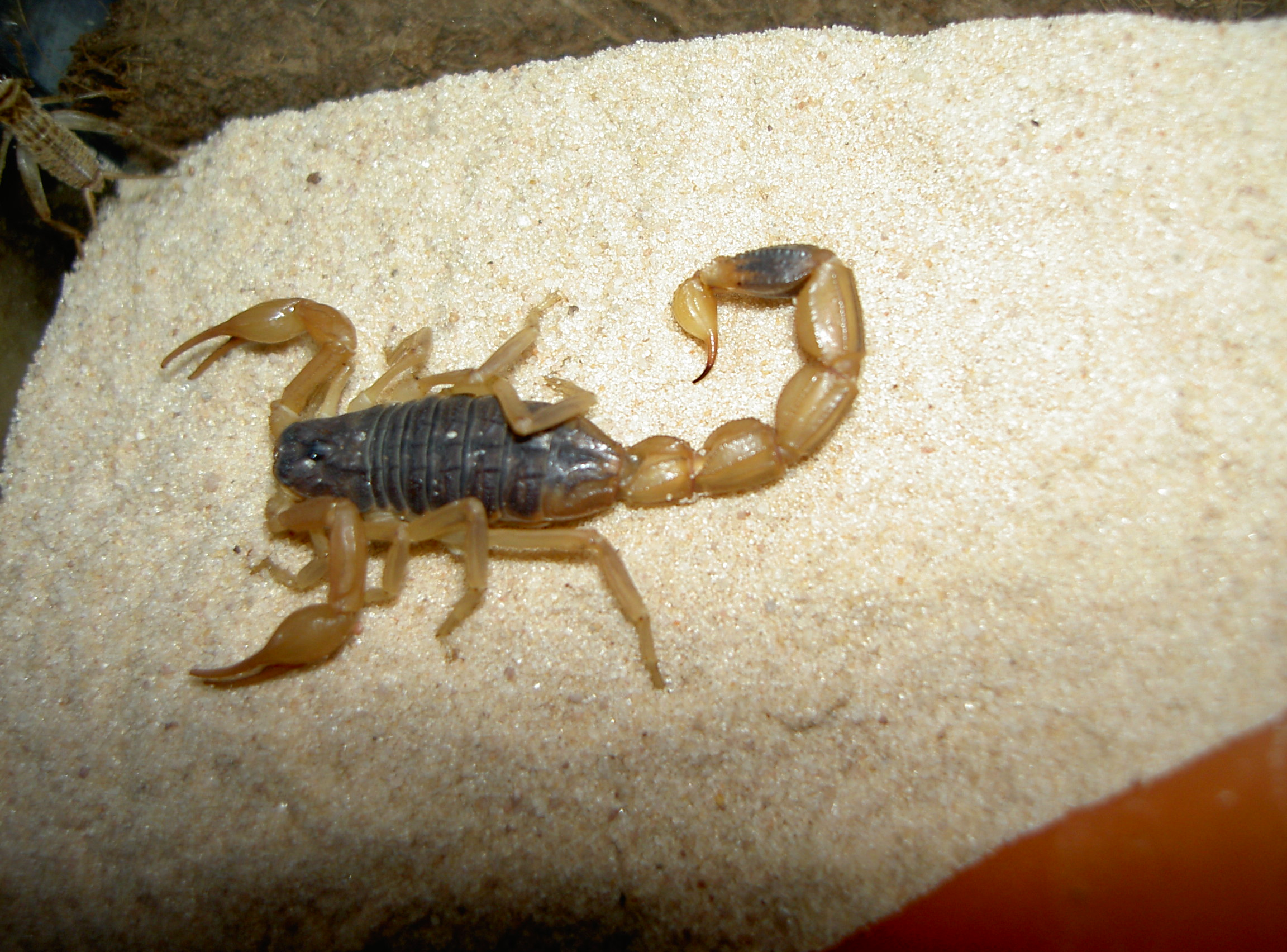

Scientific classification
- Kingdom: Animalia
- Phylum: Arthropoda
- Subphylum: Chelicerata
- Class: Arachnida
- Order: Scorpiones
- Family: Buthidae
- Genus: Olivierus
- Species: O. martensii

Binomial name
- Olivierus martensii (Karsch, 1879)

Synonyms
- Buthus confucius Simon, 1880; Buthus martensi Kraepelin, 1899; Buthus martensii Karsch, 1879; Mesobuthus martensi Vachon, 1950; Mesobuthus martensii Vachon, 1950; Mesobuthus martensii martensii Karsch, 1879

= Olivierus martensii =

Species of scorpion

Olivierus martensii is a species of scorpion in the family Buthidae. Its common names include Chinese scorpion, Manchurian scorpion, Chinese armor-tail scorpion and Chinese golden scorpion. Despite its common name, this scorpion is not only found in Manchuria or China, but also in Mongolia and Korea. The record from Japan is doubtful. Its preferred habitat is warm, dry areas with little vegetation. O. martensii can grow to about 6 centimetres (2.4 in) long, with females usually slightly larger, and has a life-span of about 4 to 6 years.

== Taxonomic history ==
This species of scorpion was first described as Buthus martensii by German arachnologist Ferdinand Karsch in 1879. Independently, Simon in 1880 described specimens he found in the gardens of the Summer Palace at Beijing as Buthus confucius, which Karsch synonymized as Buthus martensii in 1881. Subsequently, in 1950, it was transferred to Mesobuthus, a new genus established by French arachnologist Max Vachon. In 2019 the genus Olivierus was restored from synonymy of Mesobuthus and the species was transferred to Olivierus.

== Components of venom ==
The venom of O. martensii is composed of many different toxins. Over the past few decades, dozens of novel proteins in this scorpion's venom have been identified, cloned and investigated for clinical applications. For instance, at least 51 long-chain peptides related to the sodium channel toxins (e.g. Makatoxin-3, DKK-Sp1) and 18 peptides related to the potassium channel toxins have been described.

Two peptides from the venom, BmK AS and AS1, are known to act on ryanodine receptors. Apart from having analgesic properties, BmK AS is also the first long-chain scorpion peptide reported to have antimicrobial activity. Amongst the sodium channel-specific neurotoxins, there are a number of muscle relaxants, such as makatoxin I and bukatoxin, while BmKAEP and BmK IT2 have shown anticonvulsant activity in experimental conditions, inhibiting epileptic seizures induced in rats. BmK AGAP has both analgesic and antitumor properties and recombinant proteins could potentially be used in anticancer treatments.

BmP02 acts on potassium channels, blocking Kv1.3 and slowing the deactivation of Kv4.2. BmP02 is not toxic to humans or mice.

== Interaction with humans ==
The scorpion occasionally appears in packaging from China, with the British National Centre for Reptile Welfare noting that its sting is "medically significant... potentially life threatening but an average adult would just have a really bad day". (Two such stowaways were reported in October 2024).

O. martensii, especially its tail, has been used in traditional Chinese medicine for many centuries to treat various neuronal problems, such as chronic pain, paralysis, apoplexy and epilepsy.
