= SCN3A =

Protein-coding gene in humans

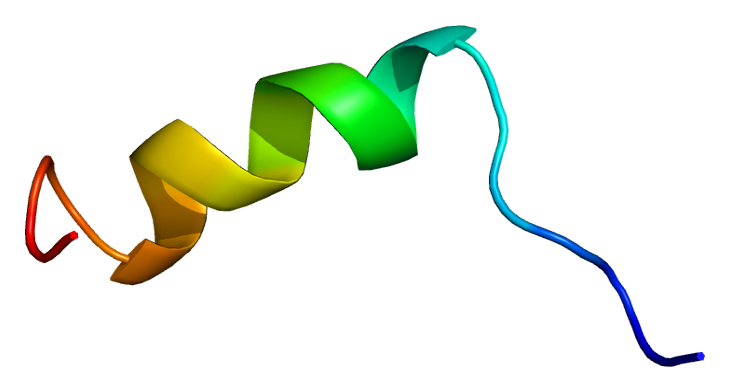

Identifiers
- Aliases: SCN3A, NAC3, Nav1.3, sodium voltage-gated channel alpha subunit 3, FFEVF4, EIEE62, DEE62
- External IDs: OMIM: 182391; MGI: 98249; GeneCards: SCN3A

Gene location (Human)
Chr.	Chromosome 2 (human)
Band	2q24.3	Start	165,087,526 bp
Band	2q24.3	End	165,204,050 bp

Gene location (Mouse)
Chr.	Chromosome 2 (mouse)
Band	2 C1.3|2 38.55 cM	Start	65,287,462 bp
Band	2 C1.3|2 38.55 cM	End	65,397,971 bp
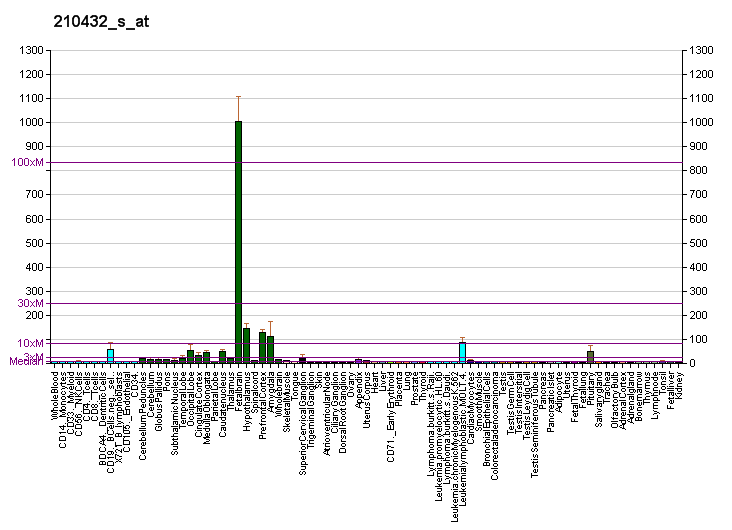
RNA expression pattern
Bgee	Human / Mouse (ortholog); Top expressed in: endothelial cell; middle temporal gyrus; entorhinal cortex; Brodmann area 23; orbitofrontal cortex; Region I of hippocampus proper; postcentral gyrus; Brodmann area 46; cerebellar vermis; superior frontal gyrus / Top expressed in: superior cervical ganglion; habenula; dorsal striatum; endothelial cell of lymphatic vessel; dorsomedial hypothalamic nucleus; ventromedial nucleus; piriform cortex; paraventricular nucleus of hypothalamus; trigeminal ganglion; ventral tegmental area; More reference expression data
BioGPS	More reference expression data
Gene ontology
Molecular function	sodium channel activity; voltage-gated ion channel activity; ion channel activity; voltage-gated sodium channel activity
Cellular component	voltage-gated sodium channel complex; cytoplasm; integral component of membrane; membrane; plasma membrane; axon
Biological process	membrane depolarization during action potential; sodium ion transmembrane transport; sodium ion transport; regulation of ion transmembrane transport; ion transport; transmembrane transport; ion transmembrane transport; neuronal action potential
Sources:Amigo / QuickGO
Orthologs
Databases	NCBI: entry; OMA: entry
Species	Human	Mouse
Entrez	6328	20269
Ensembl	ENSG00000153253	ENSMUSG00000057182
UniProt	Q9NY46	A2ASI5
RefSeq (mRNA)	NM_001081676; NM_001081677; NM_006922	NM_018732; NM_001355166; NM_001355167; NM_001355168; NM_001355169 NM_001355170; NM_001355171
RefSeq (protein)	NP_001075145; NP_001075146; NP_008853	NP_001342095; NP_001342096; NP_001342097; NP_001342098; NP_001342099 NP_001342100; NP_061202
Location (UCSC)	Chr 2: 165.09 – 165.2 Mb	Chr 2: 65.29 – 65.4 Mb
PubMed search
- Wikidata
View/Edit Human	View/Edit Mouse

Sodium channel, voltage-gated, type III, alpha subunit (SCN3A) is a protein that in humans is encoded by the SCN3A gene.

== Function ==
Voltage-gated sodium channels are transmembrane glycoprotein complexes composed of a large alpha subunit with 24 transmembrane domains and one or more regulatory beta subunits. They are responsible for the generation and propagation of action potentials in neurons and muscle. This gene encodes one member of the sodium channel alpha subunit gene family, and is found in a cluster of five alpha subunit genes on chromosome 2. Multiple transcript variants encoding different isoforms have been found for this gene.

SCN3A is involved in gyrification – the folding of the human cerebral cortex, and affects speech production brain areas.
