= Scorpion toxin =

Scorpion long-chain toxin
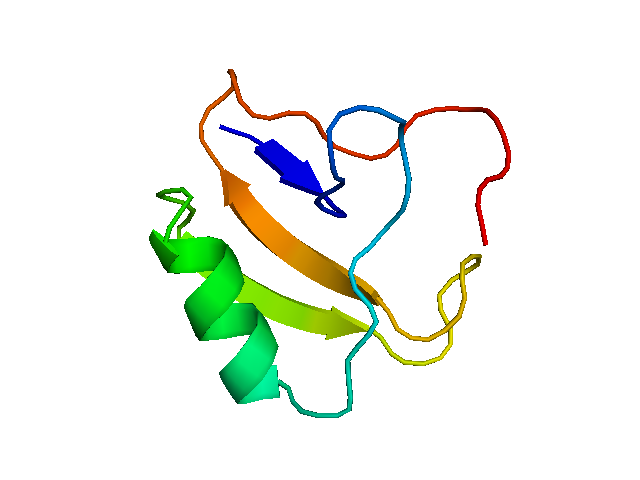
- Crystal structure of toxin II from the scorpion Androctonus australis Hector.

Identifiers
- Symbol: Toxin_3
- Pfam: PF00537
- InterPro: IPR002061
- SCOP2: 2sn3 / SCOPe / SUPFAM
- TCDB: 8.B.1
- OPM superfamily: 58
- OPM protein: 1djt
Available protein structures:
- PDB: IPR002061 PF00537 (ECOD; PDBsum)
- AlphaFold: IPR002061; PF00537

Scorpion short toxin
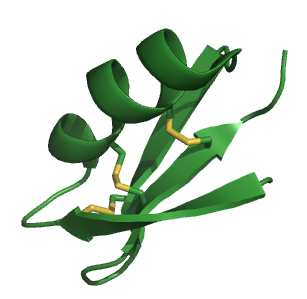
- Agitoxin-2. Disulphide bonds are highlighted. PDB 1agt

Identifiers
- Symbol: Toxin_2
- Pfam: PF00451
- Pfam clan: CL0054
- InterPro: IPR001947
- PROSITE: PDOC00875
- TCDB: 8.B.2
- OPM superfamily: 58
- OPM protein: 1ne5
Available protein structures:
- PDB: IPR001947 PF00451 (ECOD; PDBsum)
- AlphaFold: IPR001947; PF00451

Scorpion toxins are proteins found in the venom of scorpions. Their toxic effect may be mammal- or insect-specific and acts by binding with varying degrees of specificity to members of the Voltage-gated ion channel superfamily; specifically, voltage-gated sodium channels, voltage-gated potassium channels, and Transient Receptor Potential (TRP) channels. The result of this action is to activate or inhibit the action of these channels in the nervous and cardiac organ systems. For instance, α-scorpion toxins MeuNaTxα-12 and MeuNaTxα-13 from Mesobuthus eupeus are neurotoxins that target voltage-gated Na+ channels (Na_{v}s), inhibiting fast inactivation. In vivo assays of MeuNaTxα-12 and MeuNaTxα-13 effects on mammalian and insect Na_{v}s show differential potency. These recombinants (MeuNaTxα-12 and MeuNaTxα-13) exhibit their preferential affinity for mammalian and insect Na+ channels at the α-like toxins' active site, site 3, in order to inactivate the cell membrane depolarization faster[6]. The varying sensitivity of different Na_{v}s to MeuNaTxα-12 and MeuNaTxα-13 may be dependent on the substitution of a conserved Valine residue for a Phenylalanine residue at position 1630 of the LD4:S3-S4 subunit or due to various changes in residues in the LD4:S5-S6 subunit of the Na_{v}s. Ultimately, these actions can serve the purpose of warding off predators by causing pain (e.g., through the activation of sodium channels or TRP channels in sensory neurons) or to subdue predators (e.g., in the case of inhibition of cardiac ion channels).

The family includes related short- and long-chain scorpion toxins. It also contains a group of proteinase inhibitors from the plants Arabidopsis thaliana and Brassica spp.

The Brassica napus (rapeseed) and Sinapis alba (white mustard) inhibitors, inhibit the catalytic activity of bovine beta-trypsin and bovine alpha-chymotrypsin, which belong to MEROPS peptidase family S1 (InterPro: IPR001254).

This group of proteins is now used in the creation of insecticides, vaccines, and protein engineering scaffolds.

== Structure ==
The complete covalent structure of several such toxins has been deduced: They comprise around 66 amino acid residues forming a three stranded anti-parallel beta sheet over which lies an alpha helix of approximately three turns. Four disulfide bridges cross-link the structure of the long-chain toxins whereas the short toxins contain only three. BmKAEP, an anti-epilepsy peptide isolated from the venom of the Manchurian scorpion, shows similarity to both scorpion neurotoxins and anti-insect toxins.

== Function ==
The toxin's molecular function is to inhibit ion channels. The two types of Na+ channel toxins can be divided into two groups (alpha and beta) based on their functional effects. Beta (β) toxins shift the voltage-dependence of activation to more negative potentials, making the channel more likely to open at membrane potentials where activation would normally not occur. Alpha (α) toxins inhibit the fast inactivation mechanism, prolonging Na+ current through the channel. The toxins are used in insecticides, vaccines, and protein engineering scaffolds. The toxins are now used to treat cancer patients by injecting fluorescent scorpion toxin into cancerous tissue to show tumor boundaries. Scorpion toxin genes are also used to kill insect pests by creating hypervirulent fungus in the insect through gene insertion.

== Subfamilies ==
- Neurotoxin InterPro: IPR001219
