= SCN10A =

Protein-coding gene in the species Homo sapiens

Identifiers
- Aliases: SCN10A, FEPS2, Nav1.8, PN3, SNS, hPN3, sodium voltage-gated channel alpha subunit 10
- External IDs: OMIM: 604427; MGI: 108029; GeneCards: SCN10A

Gene location (Human)
Chr.	Chromosome 3 (human)
Band	3p22.2	Start	38,696,802 bp
Band	3p22.2	End	38,816,286 bp

Gene location (Mouse)
Chr.	Chromosome 9 (mouse)
Band	9 F3|9 71.33 cM	Start	119,437,522 bp
Band	9 F3|9 71.33 cM	End	119,548,388 bp
RNA expression pattern
Bgee	Human / Mouse (ortholog); Top expressed in: pancreatic ductal cell; tibialis anterior muscle; mucosa of ileum; lower lobe of lung; deltoid muscle; spinal ganglia; skin of hip; trigeminal ganglion; skin of thigh; gonad / Top expressed in: spinal ganglia; trigeminal ganglion; primary oocyte; embryonic cell; zygote; secondary oocyte; glossopharyngeal ganglion; spinal cord; neural tube; heart; More reference expression data
BioGPS	n/a
Gene ontology
Molecular function	voltage-gated sodium channel activity; ion channel activity; transmembrane transporter binding; sodium channel activity; voltage-gated ion channel activity
Cellular component	integral component of membrane; voltage-gated sodium channel complex; membrane; clathrin complex; extracellular exosome; plasma membrane; axon; glutamatergic synapse; integral component of presynaptic membrane
Biological process	bundle of His cell action potential; sodium ion transmembrane transport; transmembrane transport; neuronal action potential; regulation of heart rate; regulation of atrial cardiac muscle cell membrane depolarization; membrane depolarization during action potential; sensory perception of pain; regulation of ion transmembrane transport; ion transport; regulation of cardiac muscle contraction; AV node cell action potential; sodium ion transport; odontogenesis of dentin-containing tooth; sensory perception; regulation of postsynaptic membrane potential; transport
Sources:Amigo / QuickGO
Orthologs
Databases	NCBI: entry; OMA: entry
Species	Human	Mouse
Entrez	6336	20264
Ensembl	ENSG00000185313	ENSMUSG00000034533
UniProt	Q9Y5Y9	Q6QIY3
RefSeq (mRNA)	NM_001293306; NM_001293307; NM_006514	NM_001205321; NM_009134
RefSeq (protein)	NP_001280235; NP_001280236; NP_006505	NP_001192250; NP_033160
Location (UCSC)	Chr 3: 38.7 – 38.82 Mb	Chr 9: 119.44 – 119.55 Mb
PubMed search
- Wikidata
View/Edit Human	View/Edit Mouse

Na_{v}1.8 is a sodium ion channel subtype that in humans is encoded by the SCN10A gene.

Na_{v}1.8-containing channels are tetrodotoxin (TTX)-resistant voltage-gated channels. Na_{v}1.8 is expressed specifically in the dorsal root ganglion (DRG), in unmyelinated, small-diameter sensory neurons called C-fibres, and is involved in nociception. C-fibres can be activated by noxious thermal or mechanical stimuli and thus can carry pain messages.

The specific location of Na_{v}1.8 in sensory neurons of the DRG may make it a key therapeutic target for the development of new analgesics and the treatment of chronic pain.

== Function ==
Voltage-gated sodium ion channels (VGSC) are essential in producing and propagating action potentials. Tetrodotoxin, a toxin found in pufferfish, is able to block some VGSCs and therefore is used to distinguish the different subtypes. There are three TTX-resistant VGSC: Na_{v}1.5, Na_{v}1.8 and Na_{v}1.9. Na_{v}1.8 and Na_{v}1.9 are both expressed in nociceptors (damage-sensing neurons). Na_{v}1.7, Na_{v}1.8 and Na_{v}1.9 are found in the DRG and help mediate chronic inflammatory pain. Na_{v}1.8 is an α-type channel subunit consisting of four homologous domains, each with six transmembrane regions, of which one is a voltage sensor.

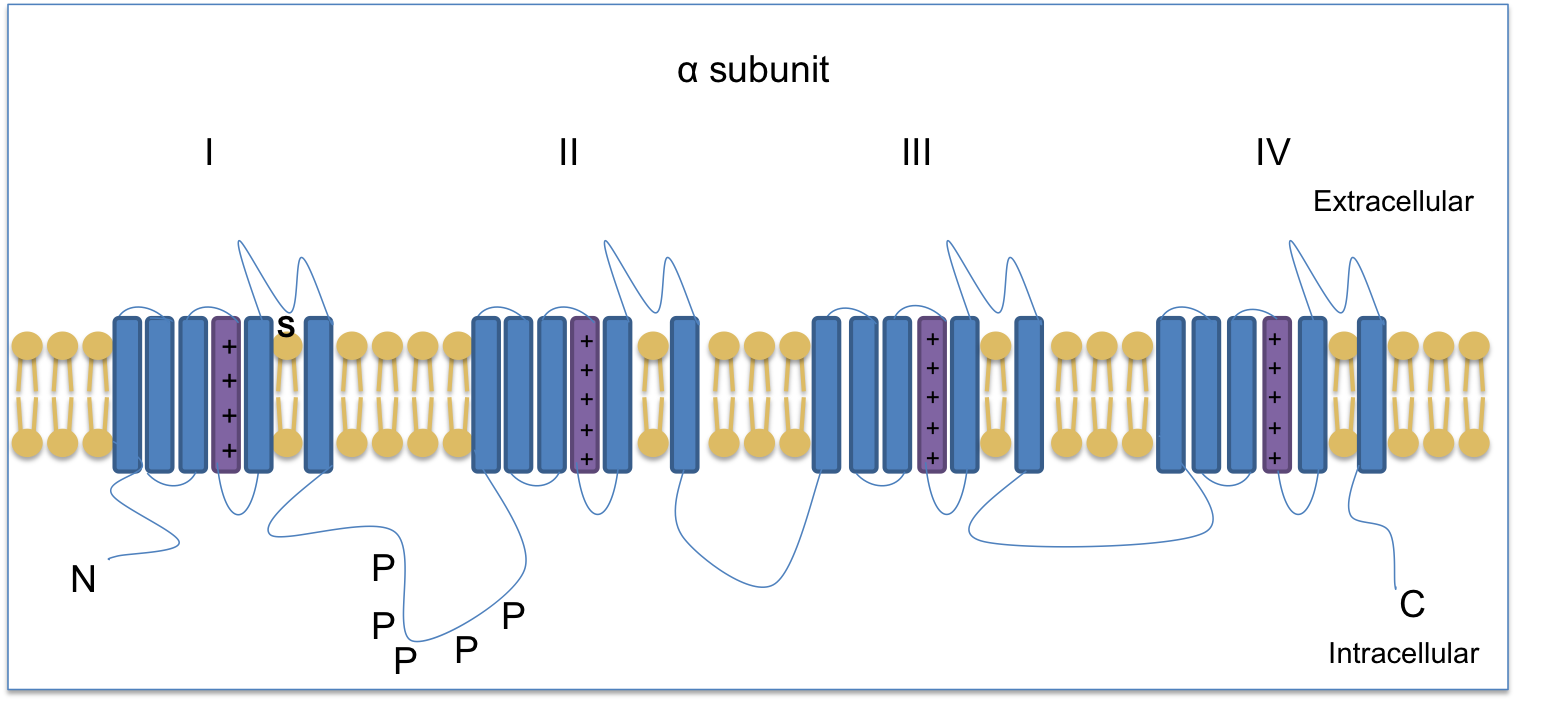
Structure of Na_{v}1.8, an α-type subunit with four homologous domains, each with six transmembrane regions. Each domain has a voltage sensor (purple). The 'P' represents the phosphorylation sites of Protein kinase A; N and C indicate the amino and carboxy termini of the protein chain. This image has been adapted from 'The trafficking of Na_{v}1.8'

Voltage clamp methods have demonstrated that Na_{V}1.8 is unique, among sodium channels, in exhibiting relatively depolarized steady-state inactivation. Thus, Na_{V}1.8 remains available to operate, when neurons are depolarized to levels that inactivate other sodium channels. Voltage clamp has been used to show how action potentials in DRG cells are shaped by TTX-resistant sodium channels. Na_{v}1.8 contributes the most to sustaining the depolarizing stage of action repetitive high-frequency potentials in nociceptive sensory neurons because it activates quickly and remaining activated after detecting a noxious stimulus. Therefore, Na_{v}1.8 contributes to hyperalgesia (increased sensitivity to pain) and allodynia (pain from stimuli that do not usually cause it), which are elements of chronic pain. Na_{v}1.8 knockout mice studies have shown that the channel is associated with inflammatory and neuropathic pain. Moreover, Na_{v}1.8 plays a crucial role in cold pain. Reducing the temperature from 30 °C to 10 °C slows the activation of VGSCs and hence decreases the current. However, Na_{v}1.8 is cold-resistant and is able to generate action potentials in the cold to carry information from nociceptors to the central nervous system (CNS). Furthermore, Na_{v}1.8-null mice failed to produce action potentials, indicating that Na_{v}1.8 is essential to the perception of pain in cold temperatures.

Although the early studies on the biophysics of Na_{V}1.8 channels were carried out in rodent channels, more recent studies have examined the properties of human Na_{V}1.8 channels. Notably, human Na_{V}1.8 channels exhibit an inactivation voltage-dependence that is even more depolarized than that in rodents, and it also exhibits a larger persistent current. Thus, the influence of human Na_{V}1.8 channels on firing of sensory neurons may be even larger than that of rodent Na_{V}1.8 channels.

Gain-of-function mutations of Na_{V}1.8, identified in patients with painful peripheral neuropathies, have been found to make DRG neurons hyper excitable, and thus are causes of pain. Although Na_{V}1.8 is not normally expressed within the cerebellum, its expression is up-regulated in cerebellar Purkinje cells in animal models of MS (Multiple Sclerosis), and in human MS. The presence of Na_{V}1.8 channels within these cerebellar neurons, where it is not normally present, increases their excitability and alters their firing pattern in vitro, and in rodents with experimental autoimmune encephalomyelitis, a model of MS. At a behavioral level, the ectopic expression of Na_{V}1.8 within cerebellar Purkinje neurons has been shown to impair motor performance in a transgenic model.

== Clinical significance ==
=== Pain signalling pathways ===
Nociceptors are different from other sensory neurons in that they have a low activating threshold and consequently increase their response to constant stimuli. Therefore, nociceptors are easily sensitised by agents such as bradykinin and nerve growth factor, which are released at the site of tissue injury, ultimately causing changes to ion channel conductance. VGSCs have been shown to increase in density after nerve injury. Therefore, VGSCs can be modulated by many different hyperalgesic agents that are released after nerve injury. Further examples include prostaglandin E_{2} (PGE_{2}), serotonin and adenosine, which all act to increase the current through Na_{v}1.8.

Prostaglandins such as PGE_{2} can sensitise nociceptors to thermal, chemical and mechanical stimuli and increase the excitability of DRG sensory neurons. This occurs because PGE_{2} modulates the trafficking of Na_{v}1.8 by binding to G-protein-coupled EP2 receptor, which in turn activates protein kinase A. Protein kinase A phosphorylates Na_{v}1.8 at intracellular sites, resulting in increased sodium ion currents. Evidence for a link between PGE_{2} and hyperalgesia comes from an antisense deoxynucleotide knockdown of Na_{v}1.8 in the DRG of rats. Another modulator of Na_{v}1.8 is the ε isoform of PKC. This isoform is activated by the inflammatory mediator bradykinin and phosphorylates Na_{v}1.8, causing an increase in sodium current in the sensory neurons, which promotes mechanical hyperalgesia.

==== Suzetrigine ====
As of January 30th 2025, suzetrigine (brand name Journavx) was approved by FDA for management of acute moderate to severe pain, as a first-in-class non-opioid pain medication (thus avoiding the addictive potential associated with opioid medications). It works as a selective inhibitor of Na_{v}1.8 channels on peripheral nerves and as such has analgesic effect, preventing nociceptive stimulus from reaching the brain by blocking signals in the peripheral nervous system.

=== Brugada syndrome ===
Mutations in SCN10A are associated with Brugada syndrome.

=== Membrane trafficking ===
Nerve growth factor levels in inflamed or injured tissues are increased creating an increased sensitivity to pain (hyperalgesia). The increased levels of nerve growth factor and tumour necrosis factor-α (TNF-α) causes the upregulation of Na_{v}1.8 in sensory neurons via the accessory protein p11 (annexin II light chain). It has been shown using the yeast-two hybrid screening method that p11 binds to a 28-amino-acid fragment at the N terminus of Na_{v}1.8 and promotes its translocation to the plasma membrane. This contributes to the hyperexcitability of sensory neurons during pain. p11-null nociceptive sensory neurons in mice, created using the Cre-loxP recombinase system, show a decrease in Na_{v}1.8 expression at the plasma membrane. Therefore, disrupting the interactions between p11 and Na_{v}1.8 may be a good therapeutic target for lowering pain.

In myelinated fibres, VGSCs are located at the nodes of Ranvier; however, in unmyelinated fibres, the exact location of VGSCs has not been determined. Na_{v}1.8 in unmyelinated fibres has been found in clusters associated with lipid rafts along DRG fibers both in vitro and in vivo. Lipid rafts organise the cell membrane, which includes trafficking and localising ion channels. Removal of lipid rafts in the membrane using MβCD, which depletes cholesterol from the plasma membrane, leads to a shift of Na_{v}1.8 to a non-raft portion of the membrane, causing reduced action potential firing and propagation.

=== Painful peripheral neuropathies ===
Painful peripheral neuropathies or small-fibre neuropathies are disorders of unmyelinated nociceptive C-fibres causing neuropathic pain; in some cases there is no known cause. Genetic screening of patients with these idiopathic neuropathies has uncovered mutations in the SCN9A gene, encoding the related channel Na_{v}1.7. A gain-of-function mutation in Na_{v}1.7 located in the DRG sensory neurons was found in nearly 30% of patients with idiopathic small fiber neuropathy in one study. This gain-of-function mutation causes an increase in excitability (hyperexcitability) of DRG sensory neurons and thus an increase in pain. Na_{v}1.7 thus been shown to be linked to human pain; Na_{v}1.8, by contrast, had only been associated to pain in animal studies until recently. A gain-of-function mutation was found in the Na_{v}1.8-encoding SCN10A gene in patients with painful peripheral neuropathy. A study of 104 patients with idiopathic peripheral neuropathies who did not have the mutation in SCN9A used voltage clamp and current clamp methods, along with predictive algorithms, and yielded two gain-of-function mutations in SCN10A in three patients. Both mutations cause increased excitability in DRG sensory neurons and hence contribute to pain, but the mechanism by which they do so is not understood.
