= Human uses of scorpions =

Interspecies interactions

Humans use scorpions both practically, for medicine, food, and pets, and symbolically, whether as gods, to ward off harm, or to associate a product or business with the evident power of the small but deadly animal.

== Practical uses ==
=== Medicine ===
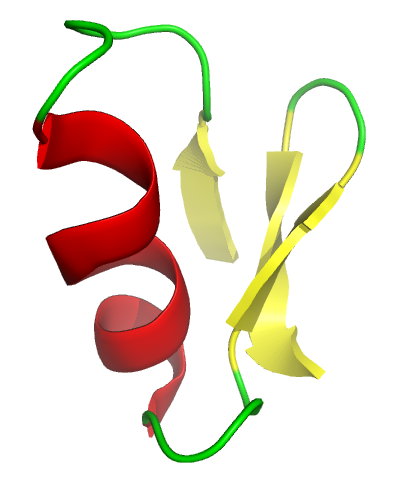
The deathstalker's powerful venom contains the 36-amino acid peptide chlorotoxin. This blocks small-conductance chloride channels, immobilizing its prey.

Short-chain scorpion toxins constitute the largest group of potassium (K^{+}) channel-blocking peptides. An important physiological role of the KCNA3 channel, also known as K_{V}1.3, is to help maintain large electrical gradients for the sustained transport of ions such as Ca^{2+} that controls T lymphocyte (T cell) proliferation. Thus K_{V}1.3 blockers could be potential immunosuppressants for the treatment of autoimmune disorders (such as rheumatoid arthritis, inflammatory bowel disease, and multiple sclerosis). The venom of Uroplectes lineatus is clinically important in dermatology.

Several scorpion venom toxins have been investigated for medical use. Chlorotoxin from the deathstalker scorpion (Leiurus quinquestriatus); the toxin blocks small-conductance chloride channels; Maurotoxin from the venom of the Tunisian Scorpio maurus blocks potassium channels. Some antimicrobial peptides in the venom of Mesobuthus eupeus; meucin-13 and meucin-18 have extensive cytolytic effects on bacteria, fungi, and yeasts, while meucin-24 and meucin-25 selectively kill Plasmodium falciparum and inhibit the development of Plasmodium berghei, both malaria parasites, but do not harm mammalian cells.

=== Food ===
Fried scorpion is traditionally eaten in Shandong, China.

== As pets ==
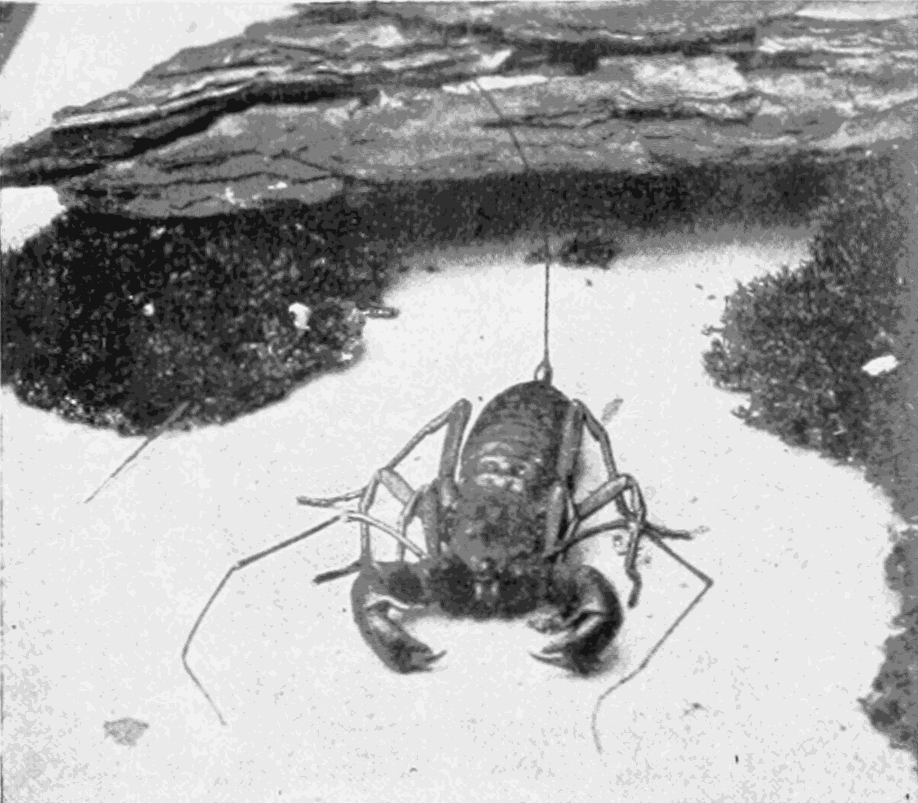
"My pet scorpion", 1899. The animal is a whip scorpion from Florida, most probably Mastigoproctus giganteus.

Scorpions are sometimes kept as pets, in the same way as other dangerous animals like snakes and tarantula spiders. Popular Science Monthly carried an article entitled "My pet scorpion" as early as 1899.

== Symbolic uses ==
=== Middle Eastern culture ===
The scorpion is a culturally significant animal, appearing as a motif in art, especially in Islamic art in the Middle East. A scorpion motif is often woven into Turkish kilim flat-weave carpets, for protection from their sting. The scorpion is perceived both as an embodiment of evil and a protective force such as a dervish's powers to combat evil. In another context, the scorpion portrays human sexuality. Scorpions are used in folk medicine in South Asia, especially in antidotes for scorpion stings.

One of the earliest occurrences of the scorpion in culture is its inclusion, as Scorpio, in the 12 signs of the Zodiac by Babylonian astronomers during the Chaldean period. In ancient Egypt, the goddess Serket was often depicted as a scorpion, one of several goddesses who protected the Pharaoh.

Alongside serpents, scorpions are used to symbolize evil in the New Testament. In Luke 10:19 it is written, "Behold, I give unto you power to tread on serpents and scorpions, and over all the power of the enemy: and nothing shall by any means hurt you." Here, scorpions and serpents symbolize evil. Revelation 9:3 speaks of "the power of the scorpions of the earth."

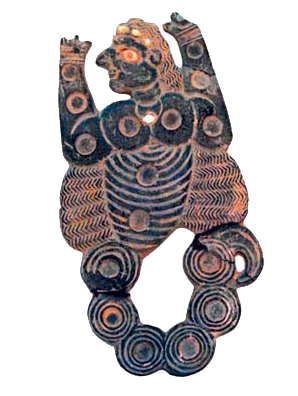
Early Bronze Age Jiroft culture scorpion game board, Iran

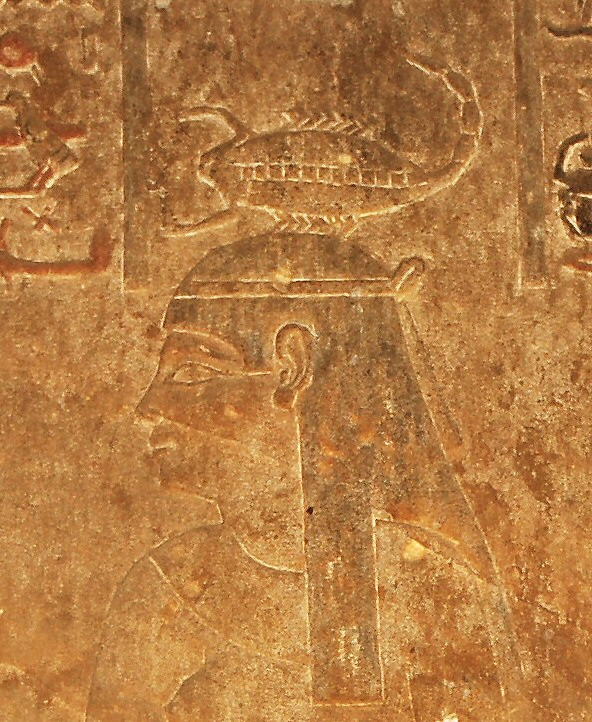
Serket, the scorpion goddess of ancient Egypt, Edfu Temple

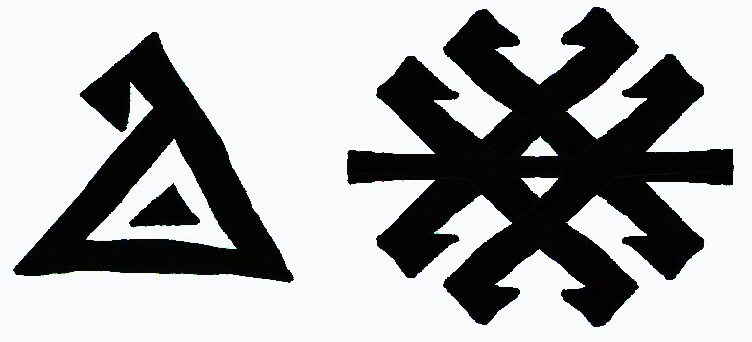
A scorpion motif (two types shown) was often woven into Turkish kilim flatweave carpets, for protection from their sting.

=== Western culture ===
The scorpion with its powerful sting has been used as the name or symbol of various products and brands, including Italy's Abarth racing cars. In the Roman army, the scorpio was a torsion siege engine used to shoot a projectile. The British Army's FV101 Scorpion was an armoured reconnaissance vehicle or light tank in service from 1972 to 1994. It holds the Guinness world record for the fastest production tank. A version of the Matilda II tank, fitted with a flail to clear mines, was named the Matilda Scorpion. Several ships of the Royal Navy have been named HMS Scorpion, including an 18-gun sloop in 1803, a turret ship in 1863, and a destroyer in 1910. A hand- or forearm-balancing asana in modern yoga as exercise with the back arched and one or both legs pointing forwards over the head is called Scorpion pose, a pose of yoga which was originated in ancient India and influential practice in classical Hinduism which is currently becoming popular in the West. A variety of martial arts films and video games have been entitled Scorpion King. A Montesa scrambler motorcycle was named Scorpion.

Scorpions have equally appeared in western artforms including film and poetry: the surrealist filmmaker Luis Buñuel made symbolic use of scorpions in his 1930 classic L'Age d'or (The Golden Age), while Stevie Smith's last collection of poems was entitled Scorpion and other Poems.

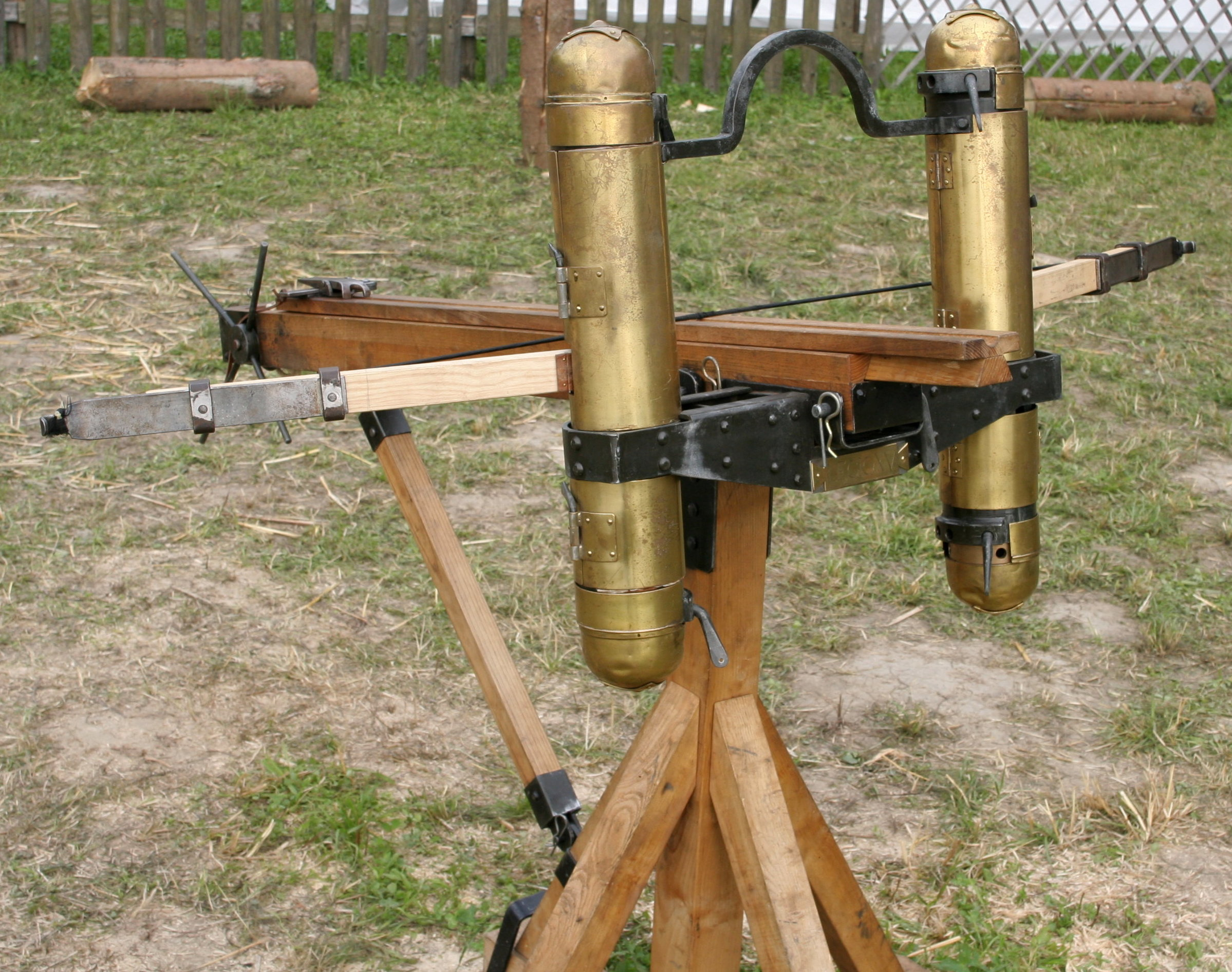
The Roman army used scorpio siege engines.

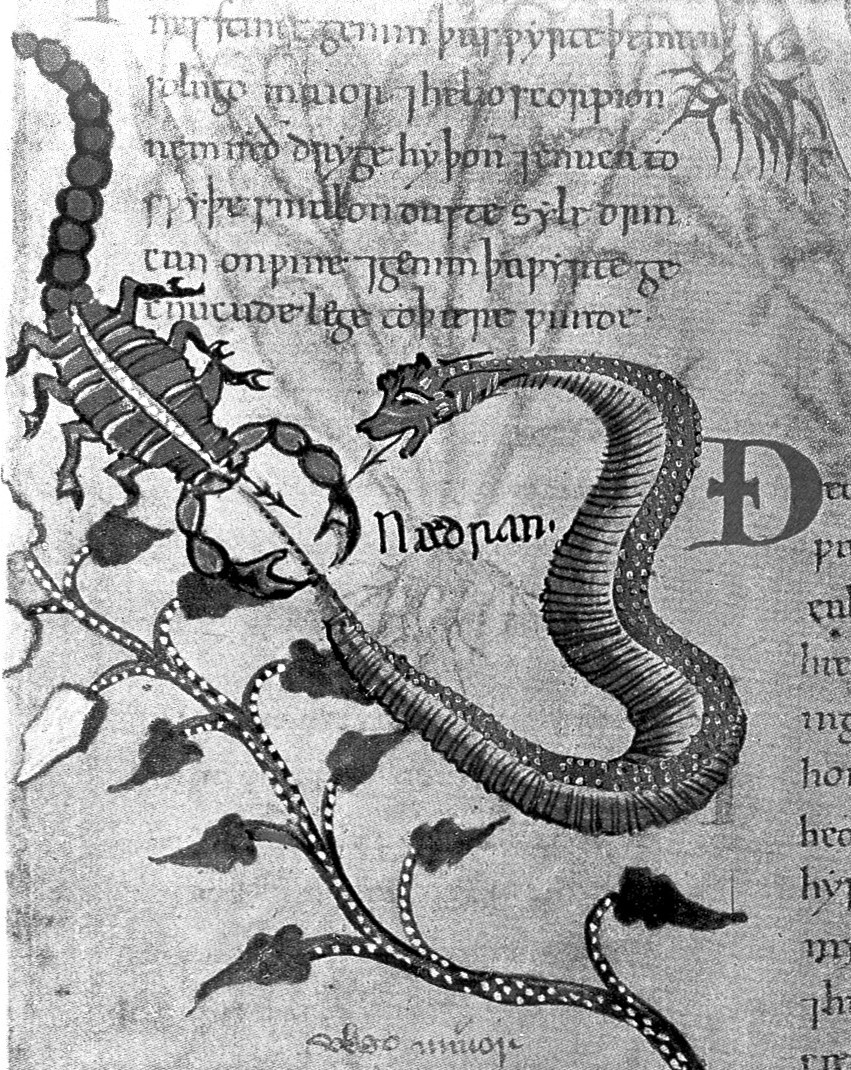
"Scorpion and snake fighting", Anglo-Saxon Herbal, c. 1050

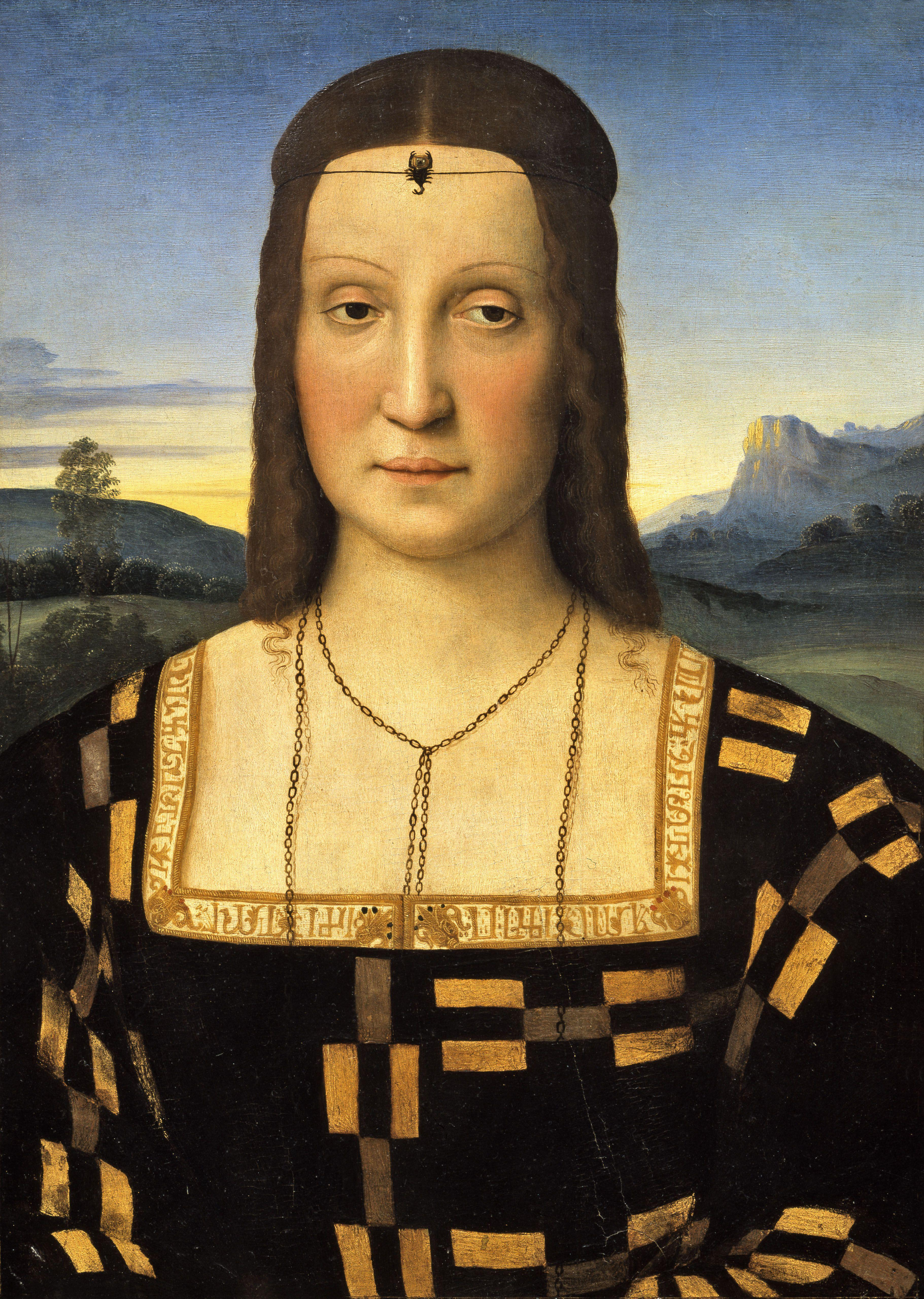
Portrait of Elisabetta Gonzaga, Raphael, c. 1504

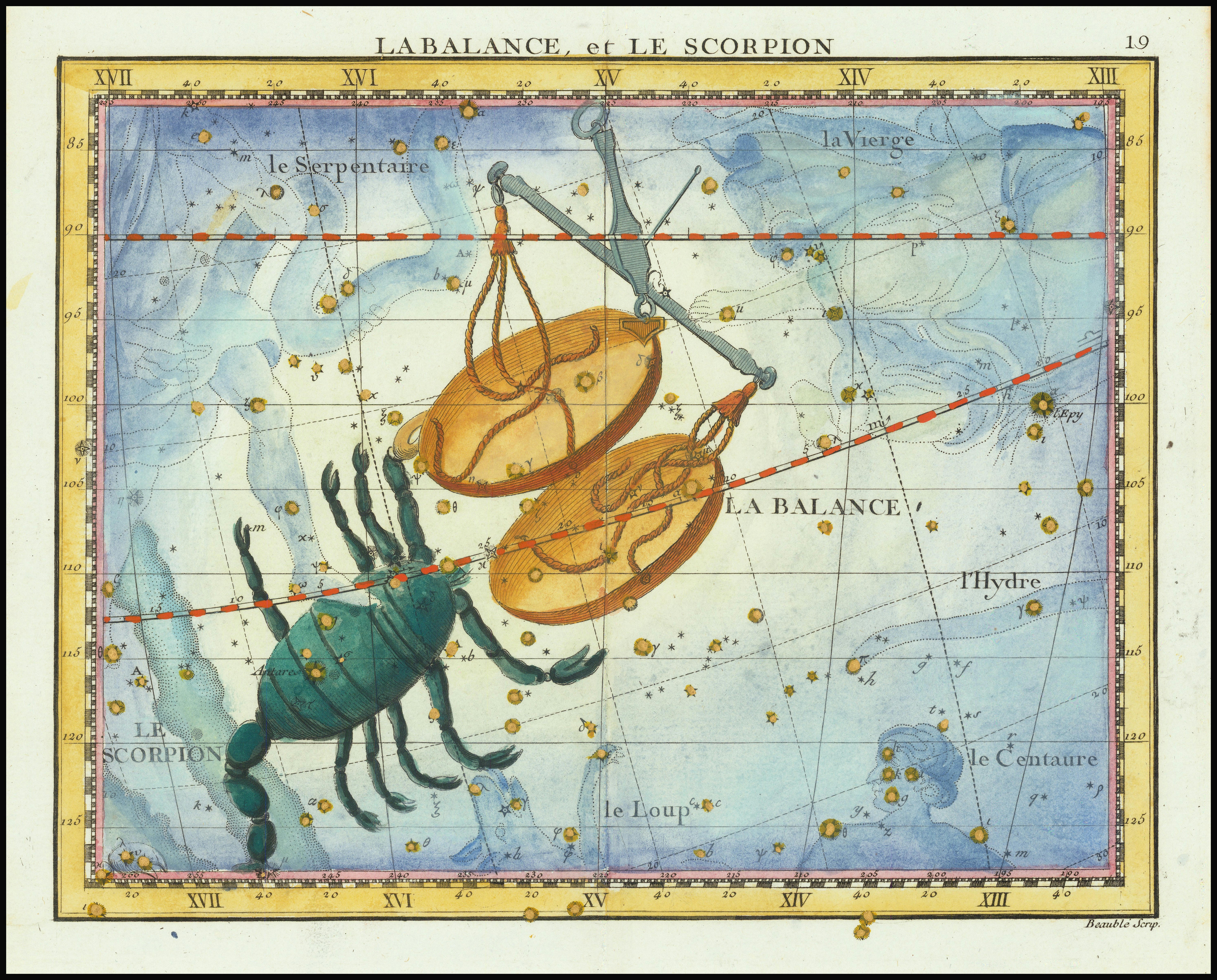
"Libra and Scorpio". Star map by John Flamsteed, 1776

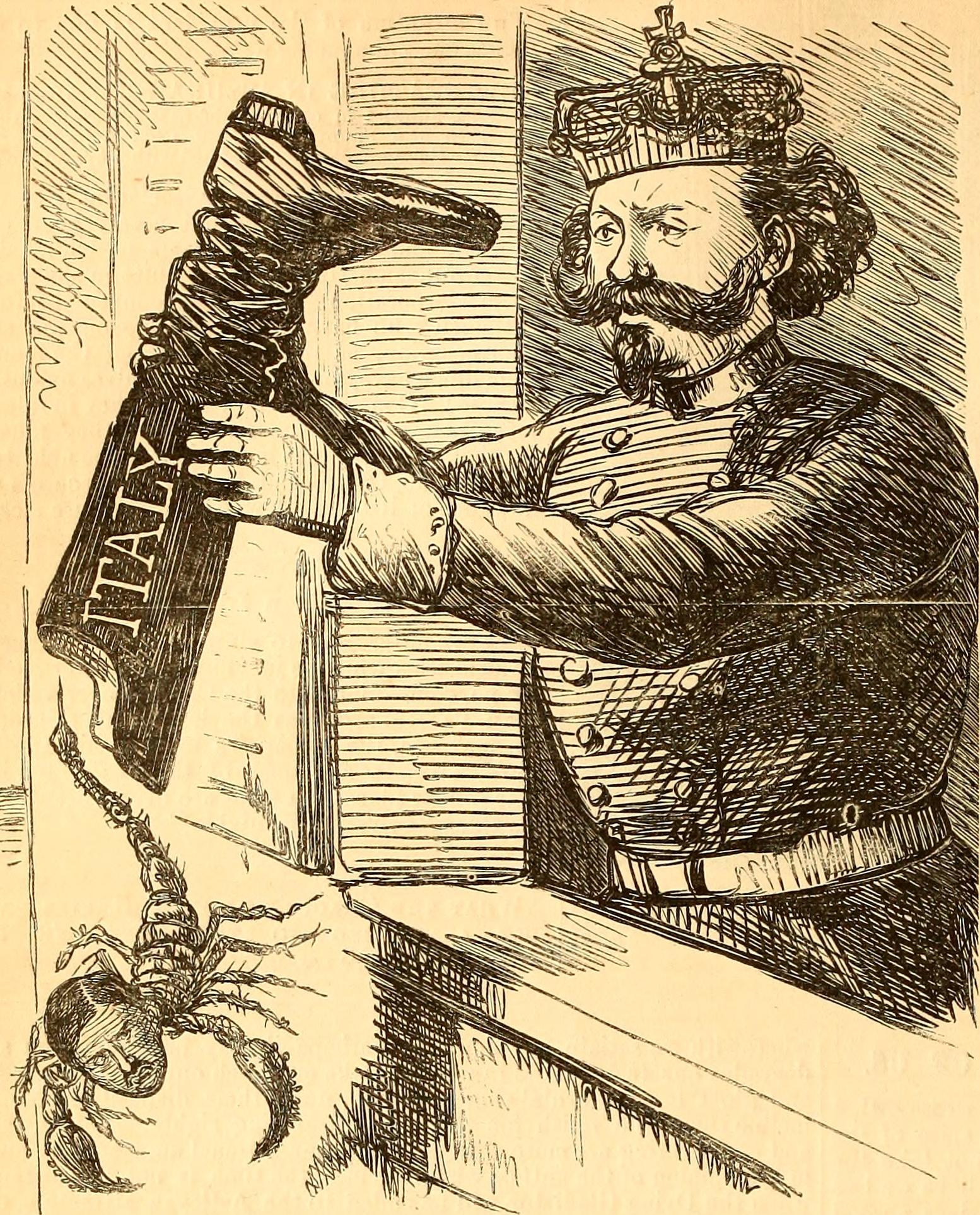
"The Italian Boot": King Victor Emmanuel II of Italy shaking Giuseppe Mazzini from the boot of Italy

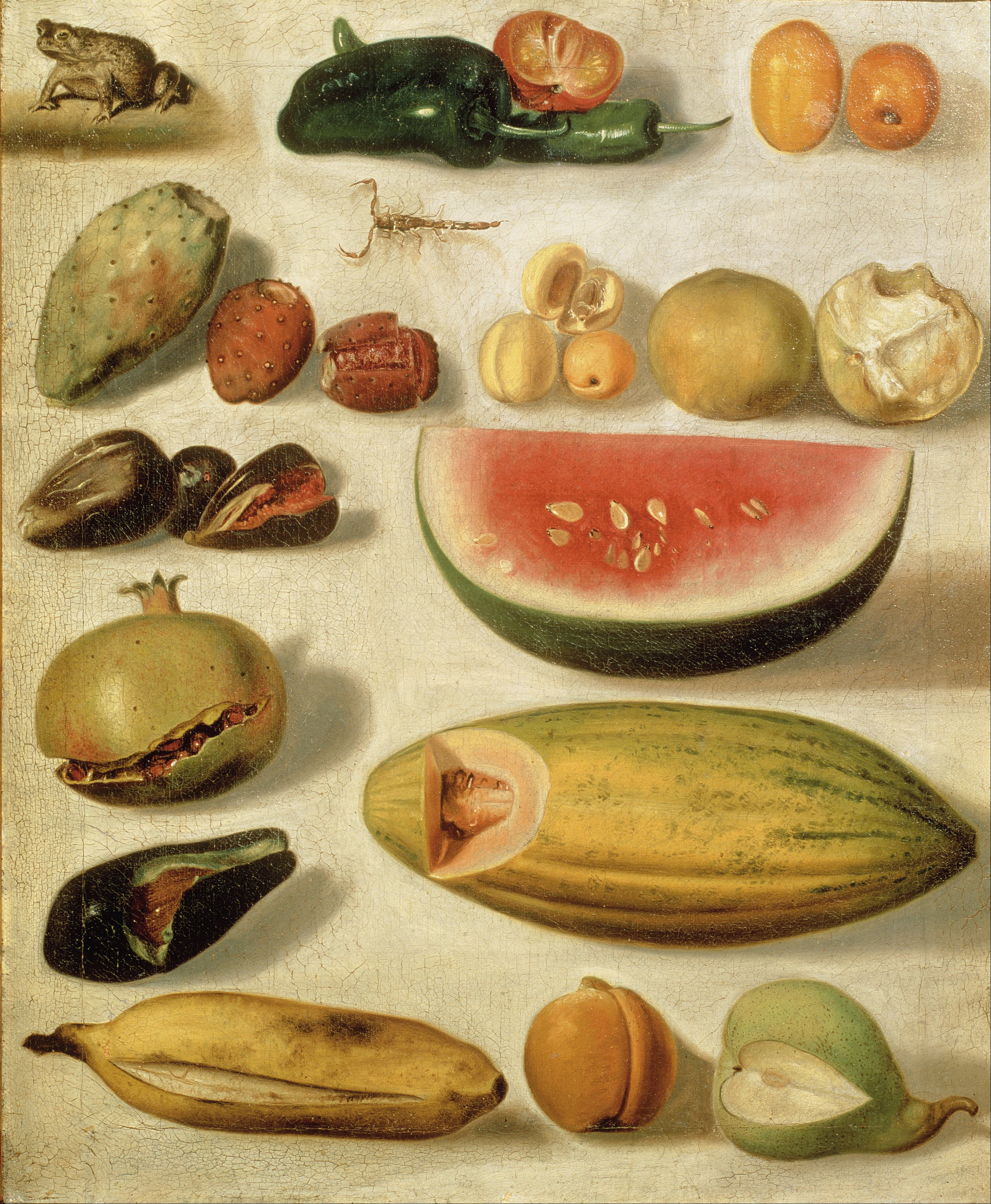
Still life with scorpion and frog by Hermenegildo Bustos, 1874

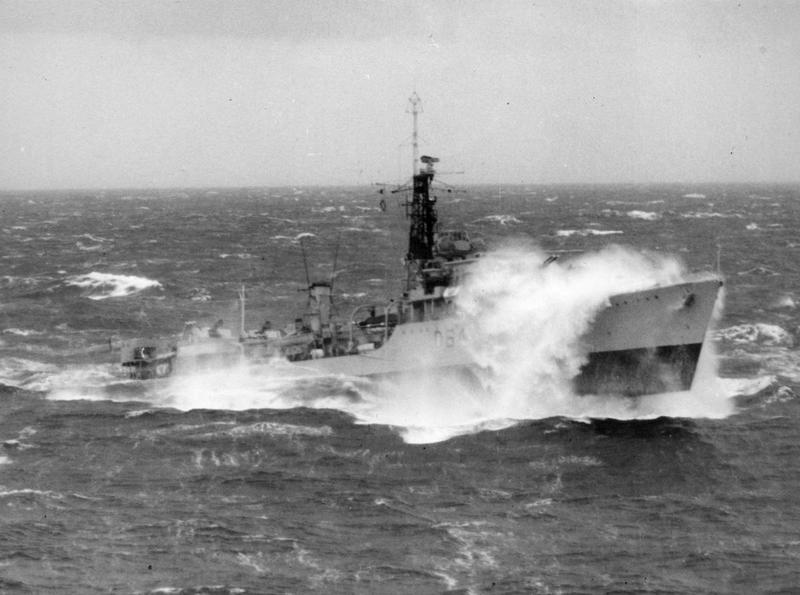
HMS Scorpion, 1953

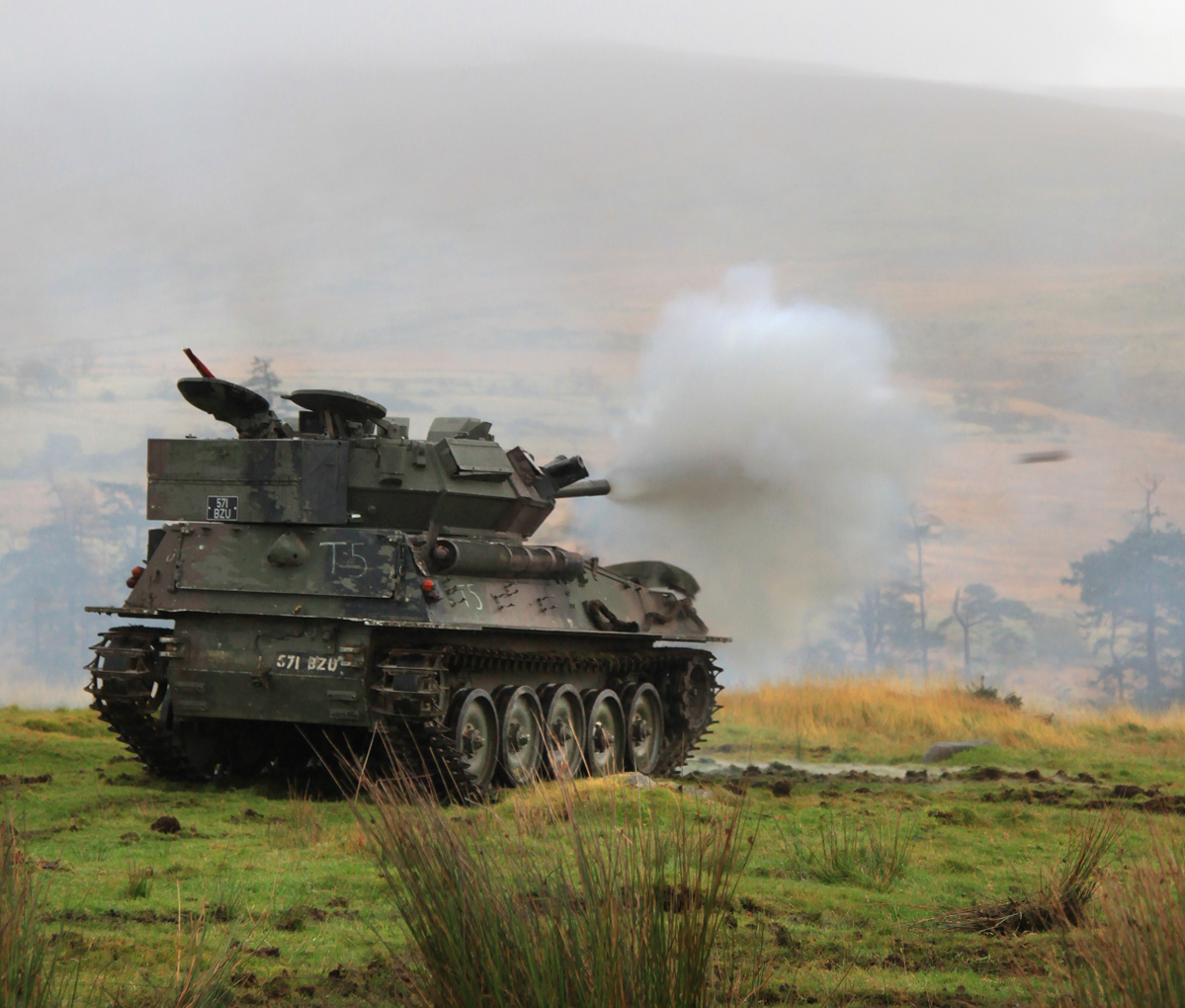
Scorpion tank

Scorpion pose

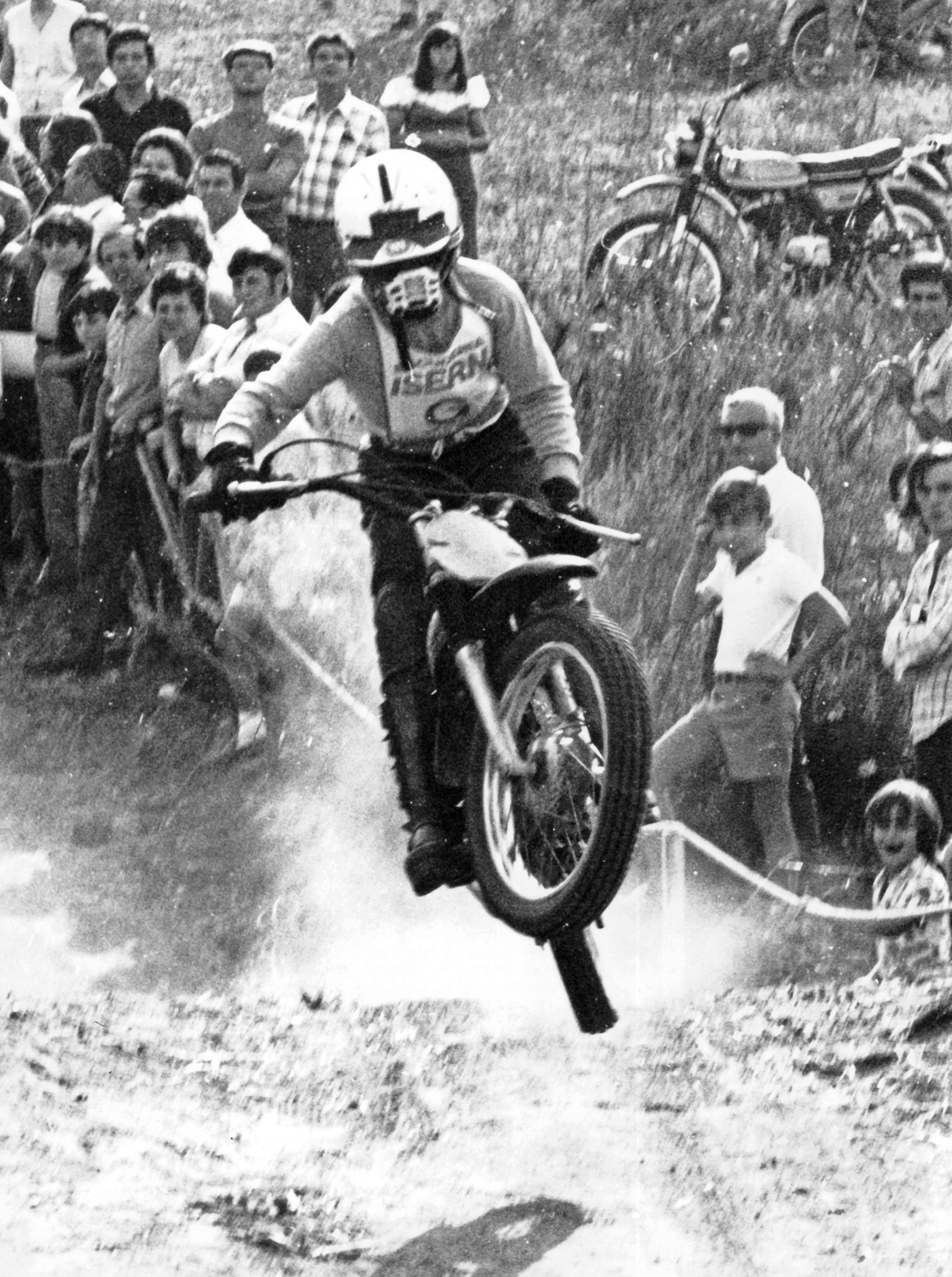
1975 Montesa King Scorpion motorcycle

=== Other cultures ===
Scorpions are among the many animals modelled in the art of the Moche culture of Peru. Mimbres artists in the south of New Mexico created painted ceramics of scorpions and many other symbolic and mythological animals on funerary bowls. A hole was ritually punched through the bottom of the bowl to "kill" it during a funeral.

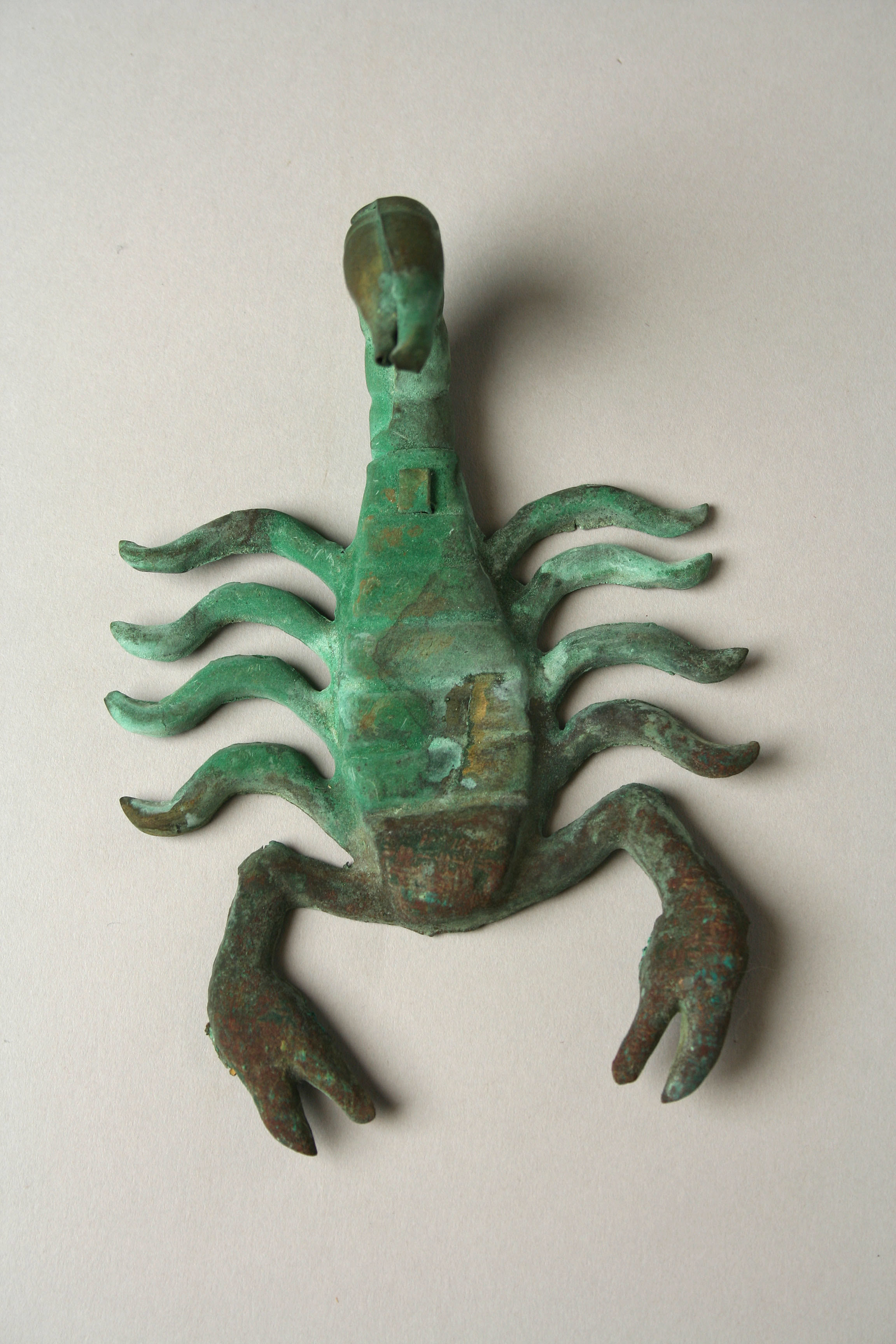
Moche scorpion ornament in gilded copper, Peru, 6th to 7th century AD

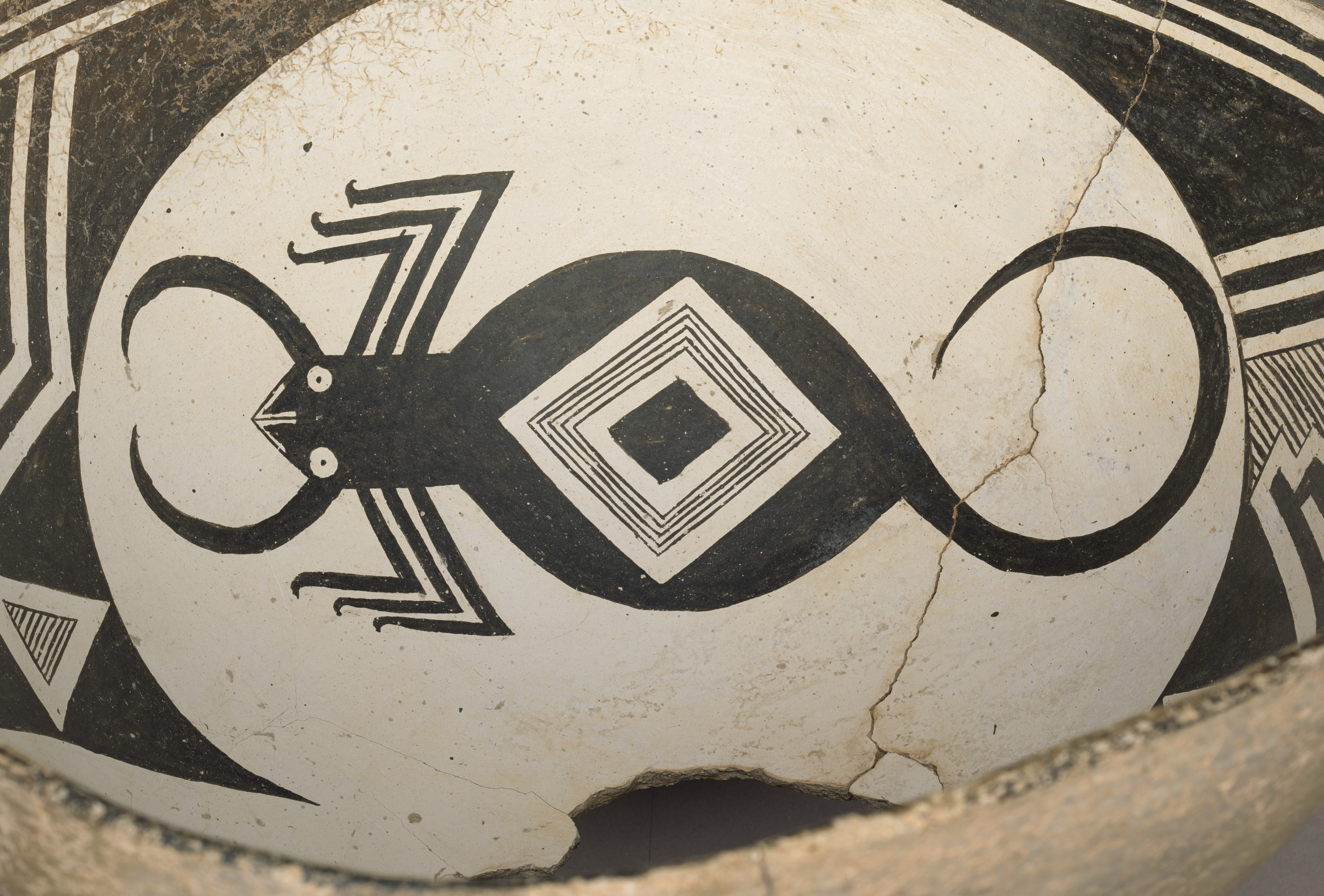
Mogollon (Mimbres) ceramic scorpion bowl, New Mexico, 950-1150 AD

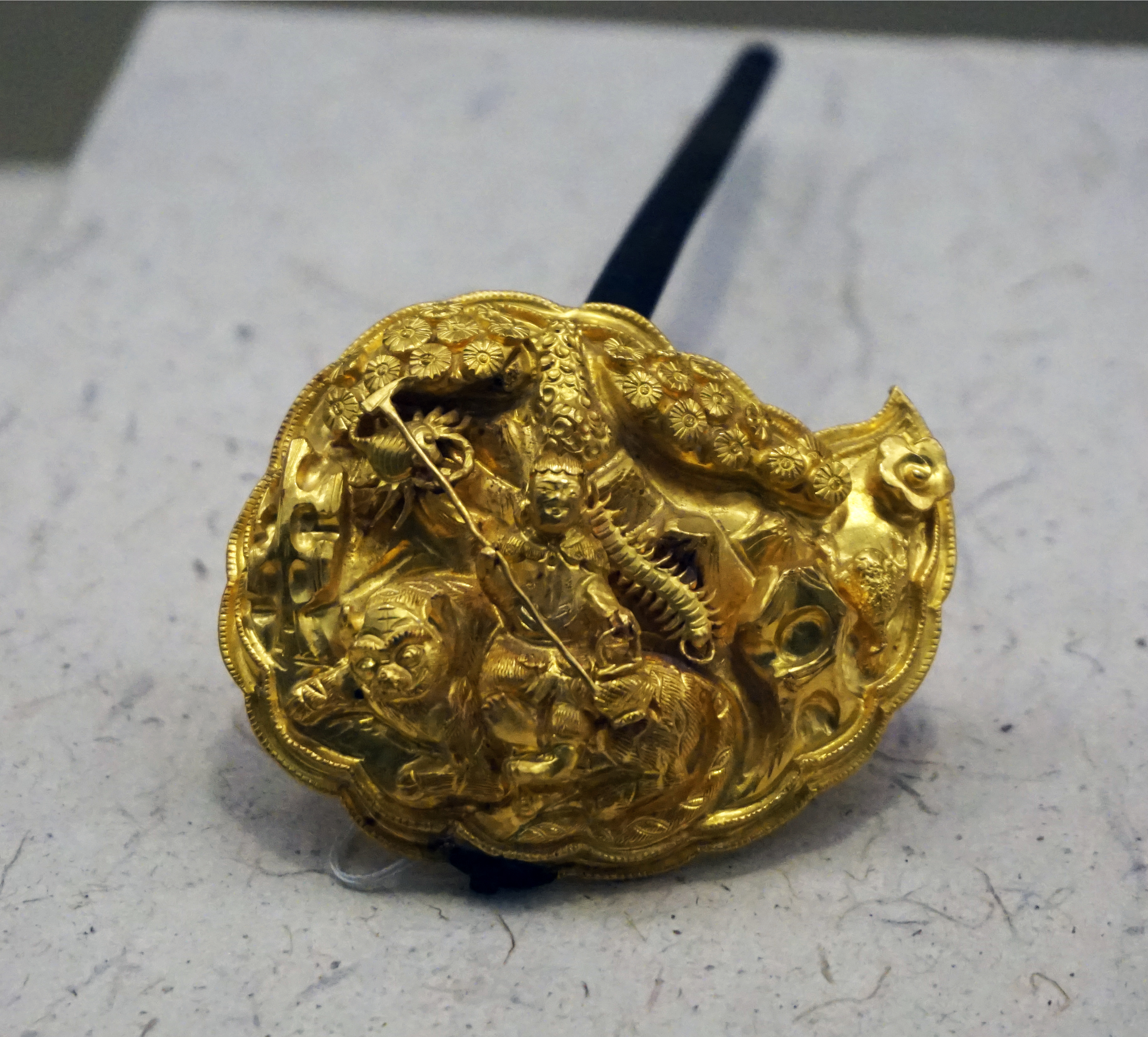
Gold ornament with scorpion and centipede, Qingyang, Jiangyin, China

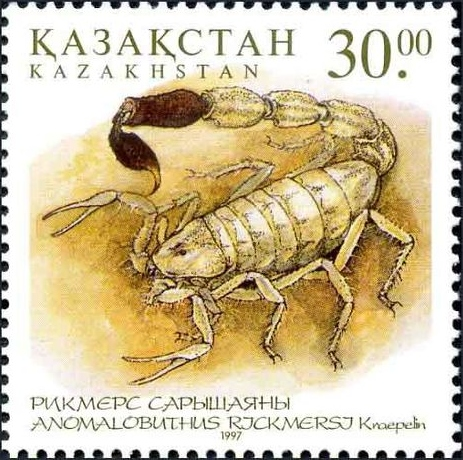
Anomalobuthus rickmersi on a Kazakhstan postage stamp, 1997
