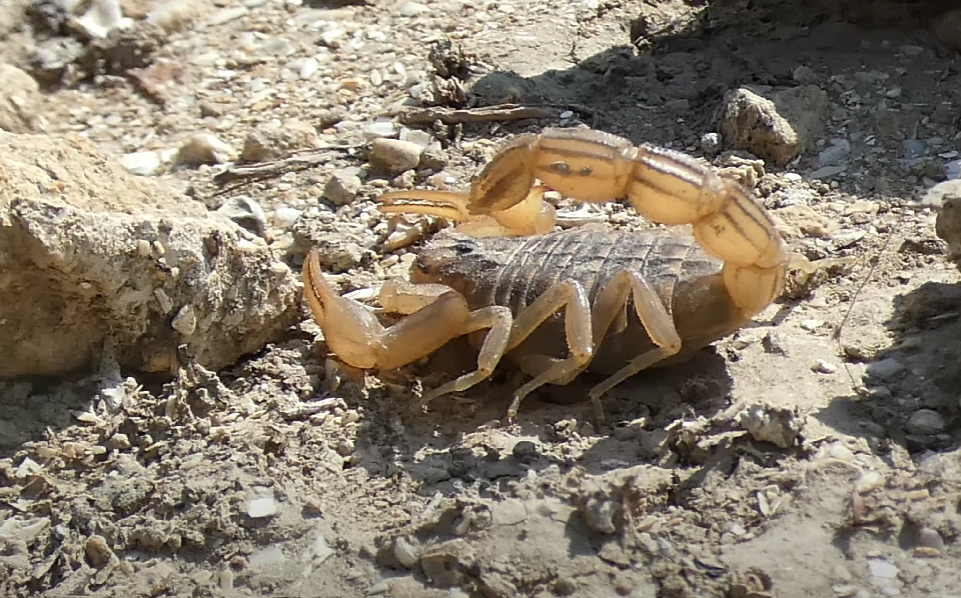
- Individual near Gobustan

Scientific classification
- Domain: Eukaryota
- Kingdom: Animalia
- Phylum: Arthropoda
- Subphylum: Chelicerata
- Class: Arachnida
- Order: Scorpiones
- Family: Buthidae
- Genus: Mesobuthus
- Species: M. zarudnyi

Binomial name
- Mesobuthus zarudnyi Nouvruzov, Kovarik & Fet, 2022

= Mesobuthus zarudnyi =

Scorpion species

Mesobuthus zarudnyi, a scorpion species within the Buthidae family, was formally documented in Azerbaijan in 2022, its discovery was attributed to the region of the Absheron peninsula. This species is named in honor of Nikolai Zarudny (1859–1919), a distinguished Russian zoologist and explorer renowned for his extensive collection of scorpion specimens in Persia (modern-day Iran) from 1896 to 1904, which greatly contributed to the field of zoology.

== Description ==
The chelicerae display a yellow coloration, either lacking or exhibiting minimal reticulation. Both the pedipalps and metasoma are sparsely covered in fine hairs. The carapace and tergites appear reddish-brown, strongly marked with black pigmentation. Meanwhile, the metasoma, telson, pedipalps, and legs range from yellowish to reddish-brown, with only a portion of metasomal segment V being black. The femur of the pedipalp typically features 4–5 granulated carinae, while the patella usually bears 8 smooth carinae. Notably, the chela lacks carinae. The movable fingers of the pedipalps possess 11–12 cutting rows of denticles and 5 terminal denticles.

The species is differentiated morphologically from both other species known from Azerbaijan by having the anal lobe divided into two parts. Both Mesobuthus eupeus and M. persicus have anal lobe divided into three parts.

Adults range in length from 40–49 mm (1.6–1.9 in) for males to 42–58 mm (1.7–2.3 in) for females. Males typically exhibit more twist in their proximal fingers compared to females. The ratio of length to width in the pedipalp chela is between 3.2 and 3.4 for males and between 3.7 and 3.8 for females. The number of pectinal teeth is 25 in males and ranges from 17 to 22 in females.
