= MeuKTX =

MeuKTX (α-KTx 3.13), which belongs to the α-KTx toxin subfamily, is a neurotoxin present in the venom of Mesobuthus eupeus. This short-chain peptide blocks potassium channels, such as Kv1.1, Kv1.2 and Kv1.3.

== Etymology and source ==
MeuKTX is a neurotoxin found in the venom of the scorpion Mesobuthus eupeus which belongs to the family Buthidae. The M. eupeus is commonly found in the semi-arid and arid areas of China. The neurotoxin's name is an acronym in which the first three letters refer to the source of the venom (M. eupeus; lesser Asian scorpion) and the last three to its nature as a potassium channel toxin.

== Chemistry ==
=== Structure ===
MeuKTX is a peptide chain of 37 amino acids forming three disulfide bridges, resulting in the molecular weight of 3987 Da. The amino acid sequence of MeuKTX is VGINVKCKHS GQCLKPCKDA GMRFGKCMNG KCDCTPK.

=== Homology ===
MeuKTX is an orthologue of BmKTX (α-KTx3.6) which is found in the closely related Mesobuthus martensii. These neurotoxins differ by a single amino acid at position 28 (Ile28Met).

=== Family ===
MeuKTX and BmKTX are members of the α-KTx subfamily which are evolutionarily conserved. Each member of this family consists of 23-42 amino acids with 3 or 4 disulfide bridges. These members share 68-97% sequence similarity and contain a specific sequence motif - AGMRFGKC. Typically, α-KTxs affect voltage-gated potassium channels.

== Target ==
MeuKTX is a potent partial blocker for rat Kv1.1 (rKv1.1), rKv1.2, and human Kv1.3 (hKv1.3). The effectiveness of MeuKTX as a blocker for these potassium channels is summarized below:

Channel	IC50
rKv1.1	203 pM
hKv1.3	8920 pM
rKv1.2	171 pM

Complete inhibition of ionic currents was observed at higher concentrations (2 μM) for all three potassium channels. At this concentration, MeuKTX also affects rKv1.6 and shaker IR channels.

== Mode of action ==
The blocking effect of hKv1.3 by MeuKTX occurs rapidly and is reversible. Channel gating does not seem to be altered by binding of MeuKTX. However, the neurotoxin supposedly binds to the extracellular side of hKv1.3. Based on its relatedness to the α-KTx subfamily, it seems likely that a single toxin molecule occludes the extracellular pore.

== Toxicity ==
In general, the M. eupeus scorpion venom has a lethal dose (LD50) of 4.5 (IV), 8.75 (IP), and 11.5 mg/kg (SC). Currently, there is no knowledge of the toxic effect of MeuKTX specifically. However it is suggested that MeuKTX blocks hKv1.3 on T lymphocytes and therefore suppresses immune responses.

== Treatment ==
M. eupeus stings can only be effectively treated using antibodies against venom components.
