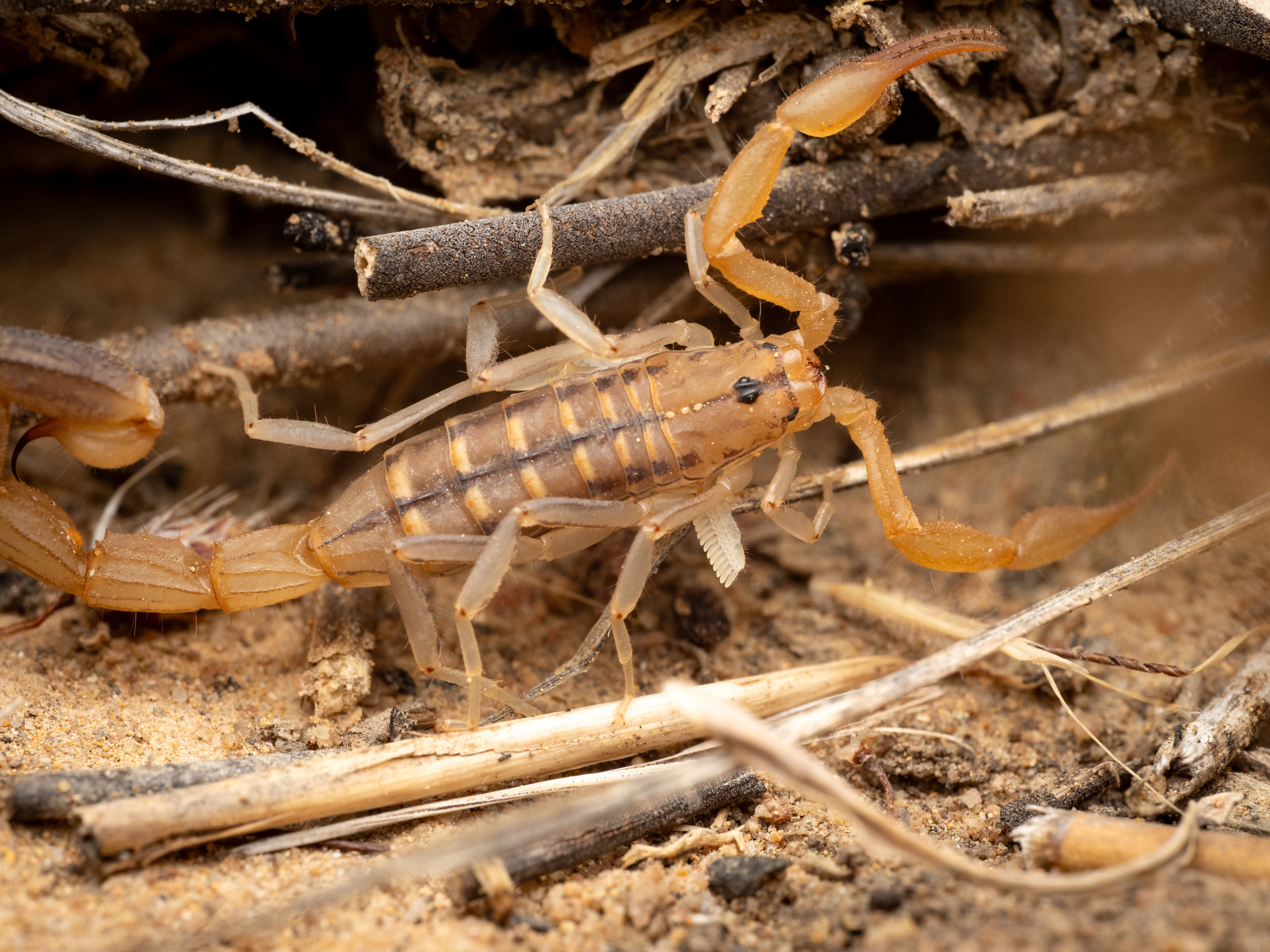
- U. carinatus in Western Cape, South Africa

Scientific classification
- Kingdom: Animalia
- Phylum: Arthropoda
- Subphylum: Chelicerata
- Class: Arachnida
- Order: Scorpiones
- Family: Buthidae
- Genus: Uroplectes
- Species: U. carinatus

Binomial name
- Uroplectes carinatus Pocock, 1890

= Uroplectes carinatus =

Species of scorpion

Uroplectes carinatus is a species of scorpion in the family Buthidae, found in Angola, Botswana, Namibia, South Africa and Zimbabwe.
