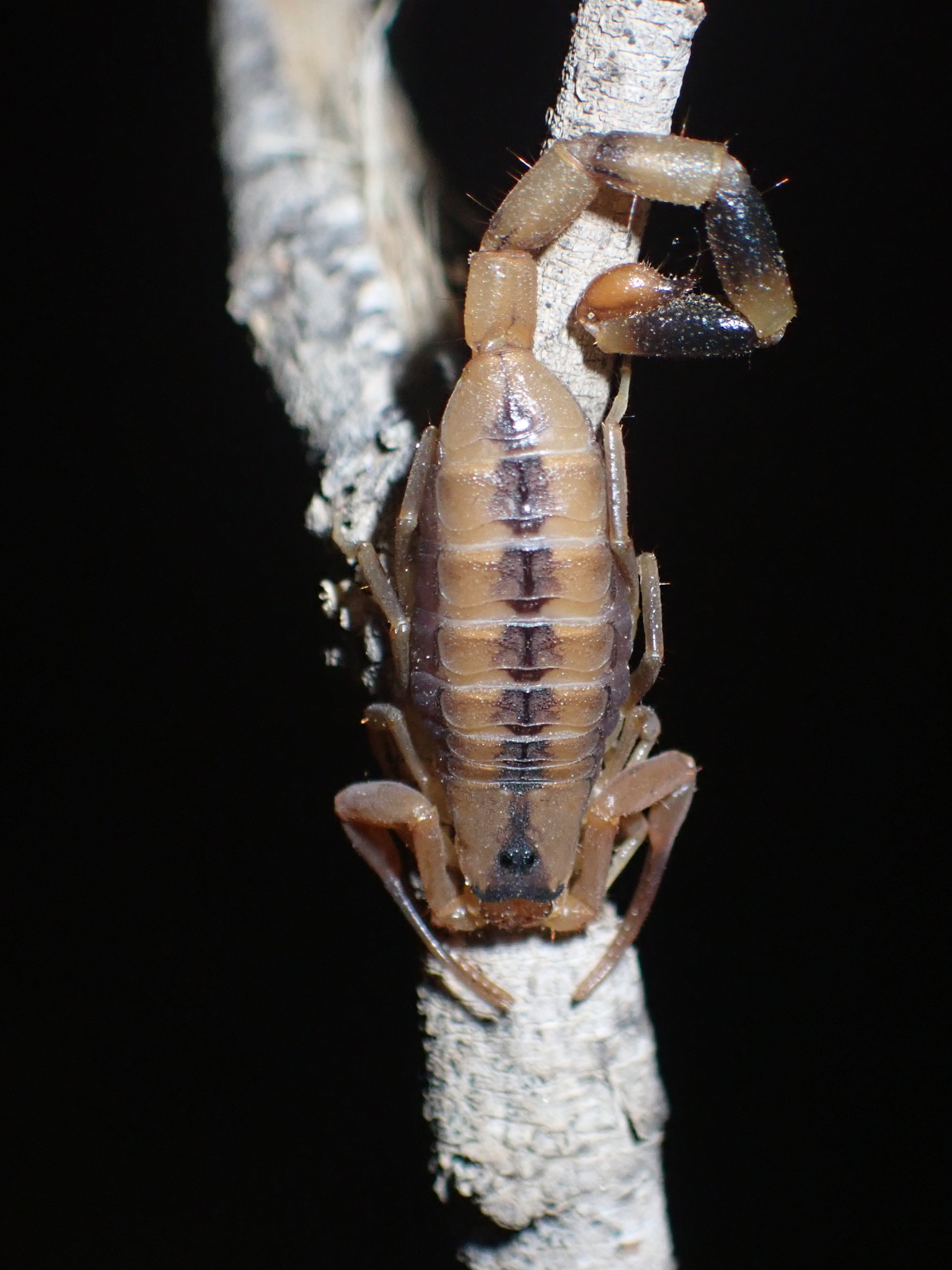
- Uroplectes otjimbinguensis at Gobabeb, Namibia

Scientific classification
- Domain: Eukaryota
- Kingdom: Animalia
- Phylum: Arthropoda
- Subphylum: Chelicerata
- Class: Arachnida
- Order: Scorpiones
- Family: Buthidae
- Genus: Uroplectes
- Species: U. otjimbinguensis

Binomial name
- Uroplectes otjimbinguensis Karsch, 1879

Synonyms
- Lepreus otjimbinguensis (Ferdinand Karsch, 1879)

= Uroplectes otjimbinguensis =

Species of scorpion

Uroplectes otjimbinguensis is a species of scorpion in the family Buthidae, endemic to Angola and Namibia.

== Taxonomy ==
This species was originally described by Ferdinand Karsch as Lepreus otjimbinguensis in 1879 based on specimens collected near Otjimbingwe, a settlement in Namibia. It was later classified as Uroplectes by Karl Kraepelin in 1899.

== Etymology ==
The specific name otjimbinguensis is a combination of Otjimbingu[e] and the Latin suffix -ensis, "of or from [a place]", therefore translating as "from Otjimbingue," in reference to the town where the species was first discovered.

== Description ==
Uroplectes otjimbinguensis is a small scorpion, achieving a maximum length of 40 mm. It is overall pale-yellow, with a broad dark band running down the center of the dorsal side of the abdomen, ending in a triangular dark patch on the cephalothorax. The third, fourth and fifth tail segments are black at the base, with the coloration extending further down each segment as they approach the stinger. The pedipalps are thin, with 11 rows of denticles on the movable finger. Approximately 15 comb teeth can be found on the ventral side.

== Habitat ==
U. otjimbinguensis inhabits woody vegetation growing in arid regions, taking shelter under peeling bark and in the holes of tree trunks. A 2008 study investigating scorpion species' richness versus altitude at the Brandberg Massif found that it was one of only 5 out of 20 documented species to be present at all altitudes (400-2,600m above sea level.)

== Venom ==
Like most scorpions, U. otjimbinguensis possesses venom consisting of a cocktail of protein, peptides and other molecules used to subdue prey and defend itself against predators. Due to a coevolutionary arms race between scorpions and their prey, the molecular structure of scorpion venom is often species-specific and can be used as barcode for identifying species. A 2018 study that investigated the efficacy of venom barcoding in a selection of Namibian and Angolan species found that U. otjimbinguensis venom had a species-specific molecular signature and was unsurprisingly most similar to the venom of Uroplectes planimanus, the only other Uroplectes in the study. Additionally, the study found that Angolan U. otjimbinguensis venom strongly diverged from that of Namibian specimens, possibly due to geographic separation caused by the Kunene River.
