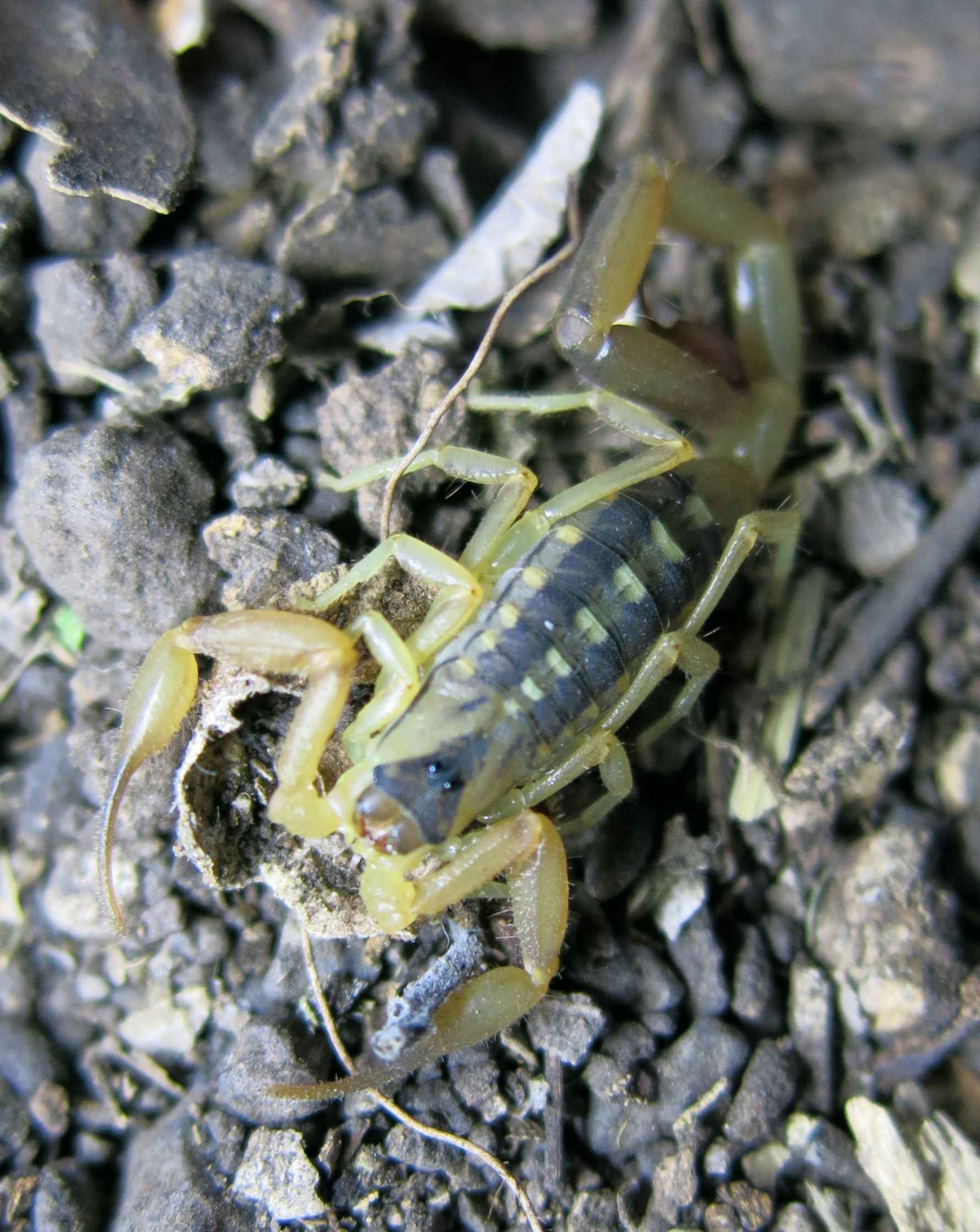

Scientific classification
- Kingdom: Animalia
- Phylum: Arthropoda
- Subphylum: Chelicerata
- Class: Arachnida
- Order: Scorpiones
- Family: Buthidae
- Genus: Uroplectes
- Species: U. formosus

Binomial name
- Uroplectes formosus Pocock, 1890

= Uroplectes formosus =

Species of scorpion

Uroplectes formosus is a species of scorpion in the family Buthidae. U. formosus is found on trees, often under bark.
