= Mesobuthus vesiculatus =

Scientific classification
- Kingdom: Animalia
- Phylum: Arthropoda
- Subphylum: Chelicerata
- Class: Arachnida
- Order: Scorpiones
- Family: Buthidae
- Genus: Mesobuthus
- Species: M. vesiculatus

Binomial name
- Mesobuthus vesiculatus (Pocock, 1899)

Species of scorpion

Mesobuthus vesiculatus is a species of scorpion in the family Buthidae. It is primarily located in Iran, ranging from the Caucaso-Iranian Highlands to Anatolian-Iranian Desert (90% of Iran). The males and females are modest in size, reaching lengths of 60 mm or approximately 2.4 inches. M. vesiculatus is known to have a yellowish to brownish yellow coloration with brownish segments located at or near tergite, sclerotized plate formed near dorsal portion of an arthropod, and dark reticulations on the basal half. In general, males have more pectines, comb-like teeth, 26-29 than females 20–22.

== Morphology ==
=== Carapace ===
Anterior of the carapace is virtually smooth, with slight emarginates. The carinae are seen to be more pronounced in males and granular in both genders. However, the posterior median carinae are small with granules on the dorsal edge of the carapace. The dorsal side of the metasomal segments are all temperately developed. Three pairs of lateral eyes are located on each side, and the median eyes are separated, from one another, by 2 ocular diameters.

=== Telson ===
The telson is globular in shape, characteristic of the scorpions in the family Buthidae, but appears more swollen with short, small, and hooked aculeus (A. Karatas, 2012).

=== Chelicerae ===
It has two reduced denticles at base of the ventral side of its movable finger.

=== Legs ===
All legs have spurs that are prolateral and retro lateral, and all telotarsi have two rows of bristles ventrally and several setae dorsally. The dactyl is small and blunt, while the ungues short, stout, and weakly curved (A. Karatas, 2012). Legs III and IV contain strong tibial spurs.

=== Hemi spermatophore ===
These are typical for this genus and family of scorpion. The outer and interior lobe of the truncal flexure are thick at the base. There are four distinct lobes with the interior lobe being the largest in size.

=== Differentiation of M. vesiculatus from other scorpions in family Buthidae ===
M. Vesiculatus is similar to Sassanidotus gracillis because they both have a large telson and narrow metasoma but M. Vesiculatus is shown to have three granules near the terminal granule on the pedipalp movable finger. M. Vesiculatus also has very pronounced carapacial and metasomal carination, and its metasomal segment are seen to be larger than that of Olivierus caucasicus and smaller than that of M. eupeus. M. Vesiculatus is different than these three other species in that its median eyes are much larger, its vesicle and aculeus is smaller, and it has a stouter carination on its pedipalp.
