= Uroplectes ansiedippenaarae =

Scientific classification
- Domain: Eukaryota
- Kingdom: Animalia
- Phylum: Arthropoda
- Subphylum: Chelicerata
- Class: Arachnida
- Order: Scorpiones
- Family: Buthidae
- Genus: Uroplectes
- Species: U. ansiedippenaarae

Binomial name
- Uroplectes ansiedippenaarae Prendini, 2015

Species of scorpion

Uroplectes ansidippenaarae is a species of scorpion in the family Buthidae, endemic to South Africa. It is the smallest member of the genus Uroplectes.

== Taxonomy ==
Uroplectes ansidippenaarae was described in 2015 by Lorenzo Prendini based on individuals collected from seven different locations in southwestern South Africa via hand-collection and pitfall trapping. Morphologically it appears most similar to Uroplectes variegatus. The specific name ansidippenaarae honors Dr. Ansie Dippenaar-Schoeman of the Agricultural Research Council, Plant Protection Research Institute, South Africa.

== Description ==
Uroplectes ansiedippenaarae is the smallest known member of Uroplectes, with adults ranging at 16–20 mm in length.

It exhibits a primary coloration ranging from pale yellowish to reddish orange. Although generally unadorned, the body does possess some regions of darker pigmentation. The pincers' fingers are notably dark, while the outer sides of the mouthparts typically also exhibit dark areas. Dark stripes run down the center of the scorpion's carapace as well as along both its sides. The fifth section of the tail appears entirely dark, forming a distinctive contrast with the lighter coloration of the stinger.

== Distribution and ecology ==
Uroplectes ansiedippenaarae is endemic to South Africa, where it is known from only eight localities spanning the southwestern Northern Cape and the northern Western Cape provinces. Its distribution falls within the Succulent Karoo ecoregion.

The known localities of the scorpion span four different vegetation types that fall under the Succulent Karoo biome: Central Knersvlakte Vygieveld, Northern Knersvlakte Vygieveld, Hantam Karoo, and Tanqua Escarpment Shrubland. Individuals were often collected in rocky areas of terrain, indicating that the species is lapidicolous (adapted to live in rocky environments).
