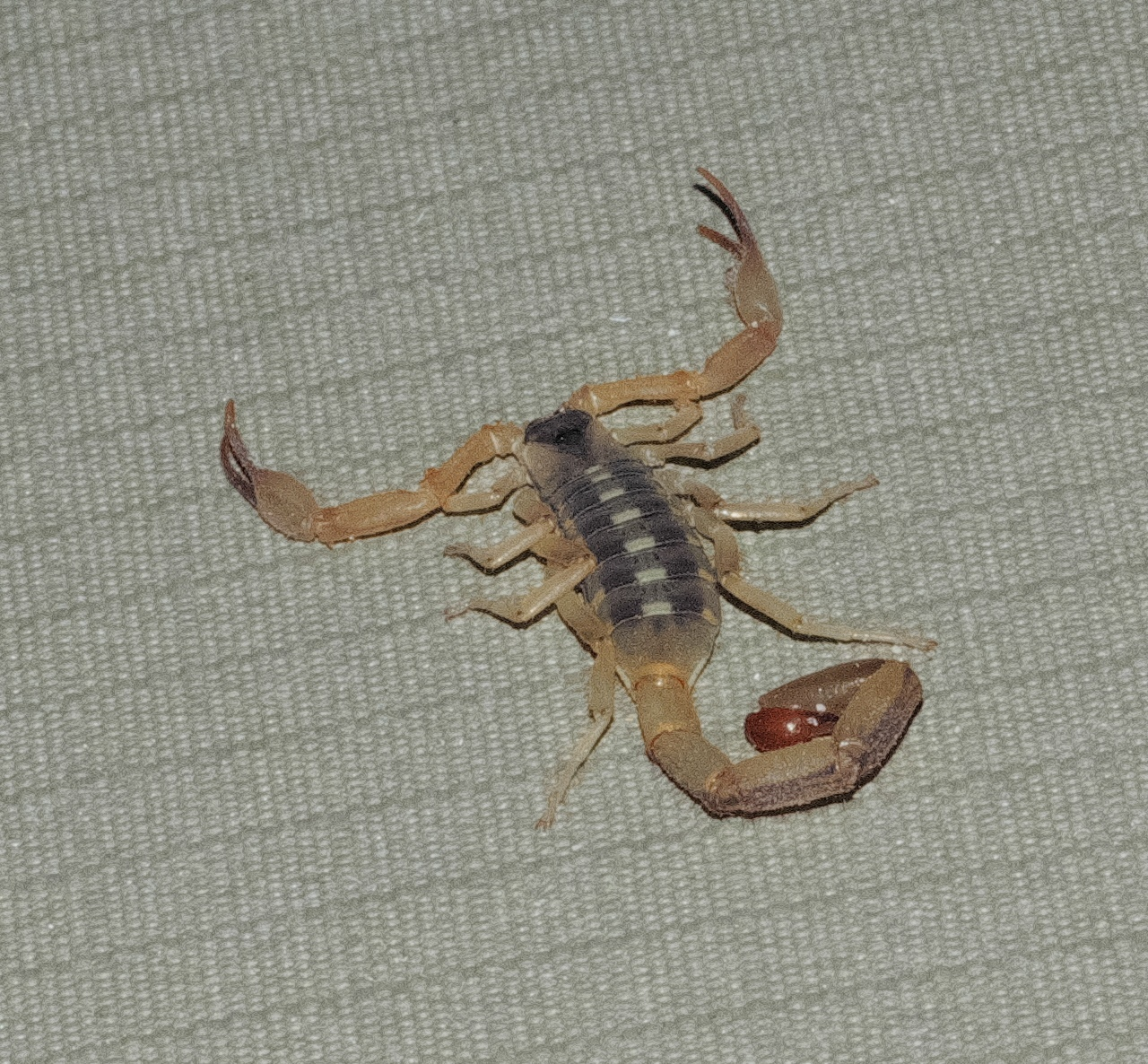
- Uroplectes vittatus, Bark Scorpion, Botswana

Scientific classification
- Kingdom: Animalia
- Phylum: Arthropoda
- Subphylum: Chelicerata
- Class: Arachnida
- Order: Scorpiones
- Family: Buthidae
- Genus: Uroplectes
- Species: U. vittatus

Binomial name
- Uroplectes vittatus (Thorell, 1876)

= Uroplectes vittatus =

Species of scorpions

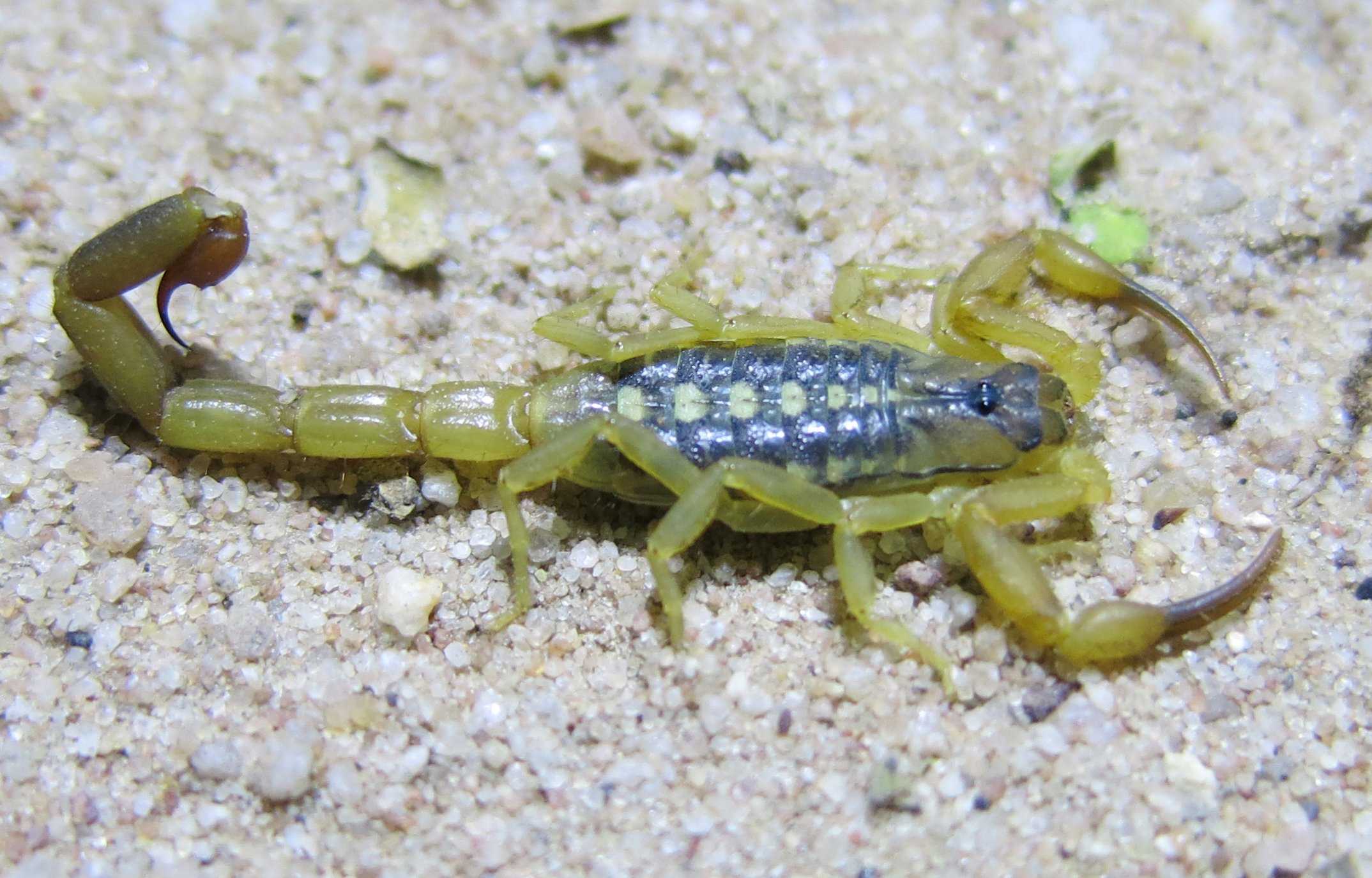

Uroplectes vittatus is a species of scorpion in the family Buthidae. It is found in southern Africa.

This scorpion is under 6 cm. (tail extended). It has a pale, yellow-to-orange color with a dark back. There is typically a line of pale to yellow marks on the center of its back, and often a dark triangular or v-shaped mark forward from its eyes. The scorpion is considered mildly venomous.
