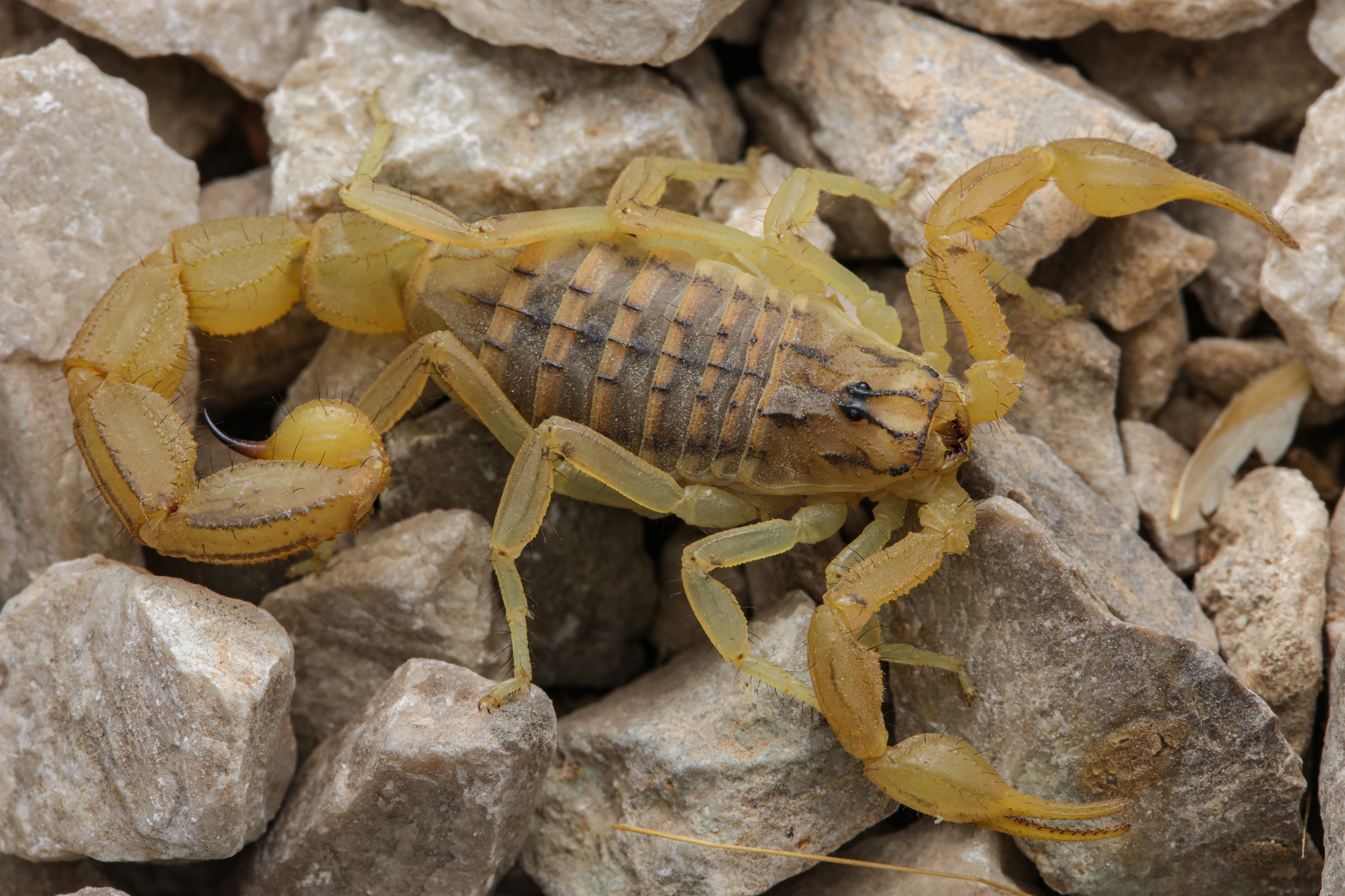
- Mesobuthus crucittii

Scientific classification
- Kingdom: Animalia
- Phylum: Arthropoda
- Subphylum: Chelicerata
- Class: Arachnida
- Order: Scorpiones
- Family: Buthidae
- Genus: Mesobuthus; Vachon, 1950

Synonyms
- Afghanobuthus (Lourenço, 2005)

= Mesobuthus =

Genus of scorpions

Mesobuthus is an Asian genus of scorpions in the family Buthidae.

== Species ==
Mesobuthus contains the following species:

- Mesobuthus afghanus (Pocock, 1889)
- Mesobuthus barszczewskii (Birula, 1904)
- Mesobuthus birulai Kovarik et al., 2022
- Mesobuthus bogdoensis (Birula, 1896)
- Mesobuthus crucittii Kovarik et al., 2022
- Mesobuthus eupeus (C.L. Koch, 1839)
- Mesobuthus fomichevi Kovarik et al., 2022
- Mesobuthus farleyi Kovarik et al., 2022
- Mesobuthus galinae Kovarik et al., 2022
- Mesobuthus haarlovi Vachon, 1958
- Mesobuthus iranus (Birula, 1917)
- Mesobuthus kaftani Kovarik et al., 2022
- Mesobuthus kirmanensis (Birula, 1900)
- Mesobuthus macmahoni (Pocock, 1900)
- Mesobuthus marusiki Kovarik et al., 2022
- Mesobuthus mesopotamicus Penther, 1912
- Mesobuthus mirshamsii Kovarik et al., 2022
- Mesobuthus navidpouri Kovarik et al., 2022
- Mesobuthus persicus (Pocock, 1899)
- Mesobuthus philippovitschi (Birula, 1905)
- Mesobuthus phillipsi (Pocock, 1889)
- Mesobuthus rahsenae Kovarik et al., 2022
- Mesobuthus thersites (C. L. Koch, 1839)
- Mesobuthus turcicus Kovarik et al., 2022
- Mesobuthus vesiculatus (Pocock, 1899)
- Mesobuthus vignolii Kovarik et al., 2022
- Mesobuthus yagmuri Kovarik & Fet, 2022
- Mesobuthus zarudnyi Nouvruzov, Kovarik & Fet, 2022
- Mesobuthus zonsteini Kovarik et al., 2022
