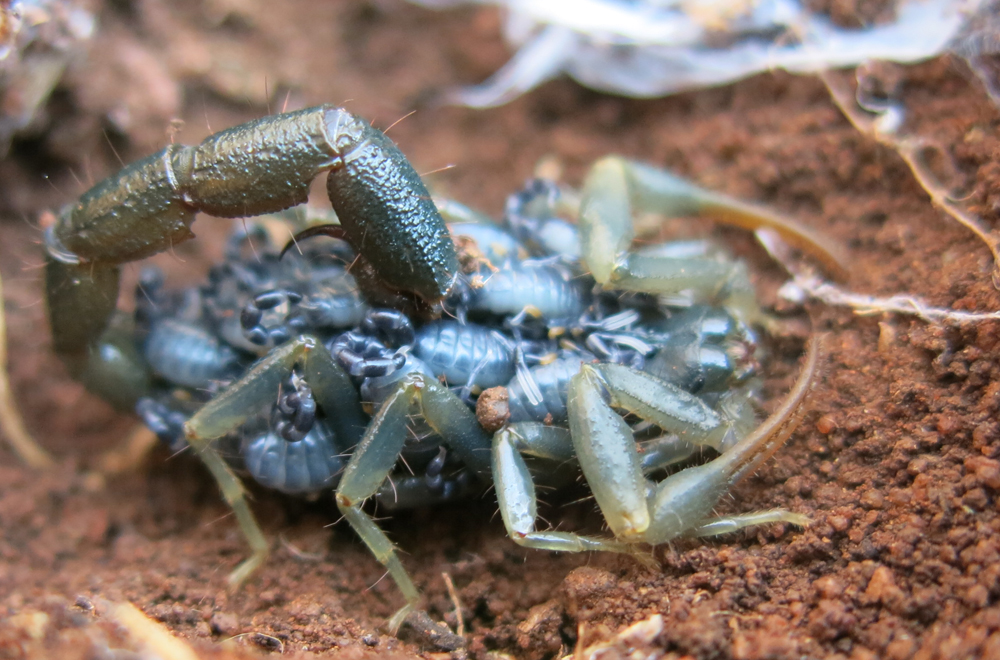
- Uroplectes olivaceus with young, Soutpansberg, South Africa

Scientific classification
- Kingdom: Animalia
- Phylum: Arthropoda
- Subphylum: Chelicerata
- Class: Arachnida
- Order: Scorpiones
- Family: Buthidae
- Genus: Uroplectes
- Species: U. olivaceus

Binomial name
- Uroplectes olivaceus (Pocock, 1896)

= Uroplectes olivaceus =

Species of scorpion

Uroplectes olivaceus is a scorpion of the family Buthidae. The species are 60 mm in length, are black colored, and have fine granulations on their tails. Their venom is not deadly to humans; however, it might cause some swelling.
