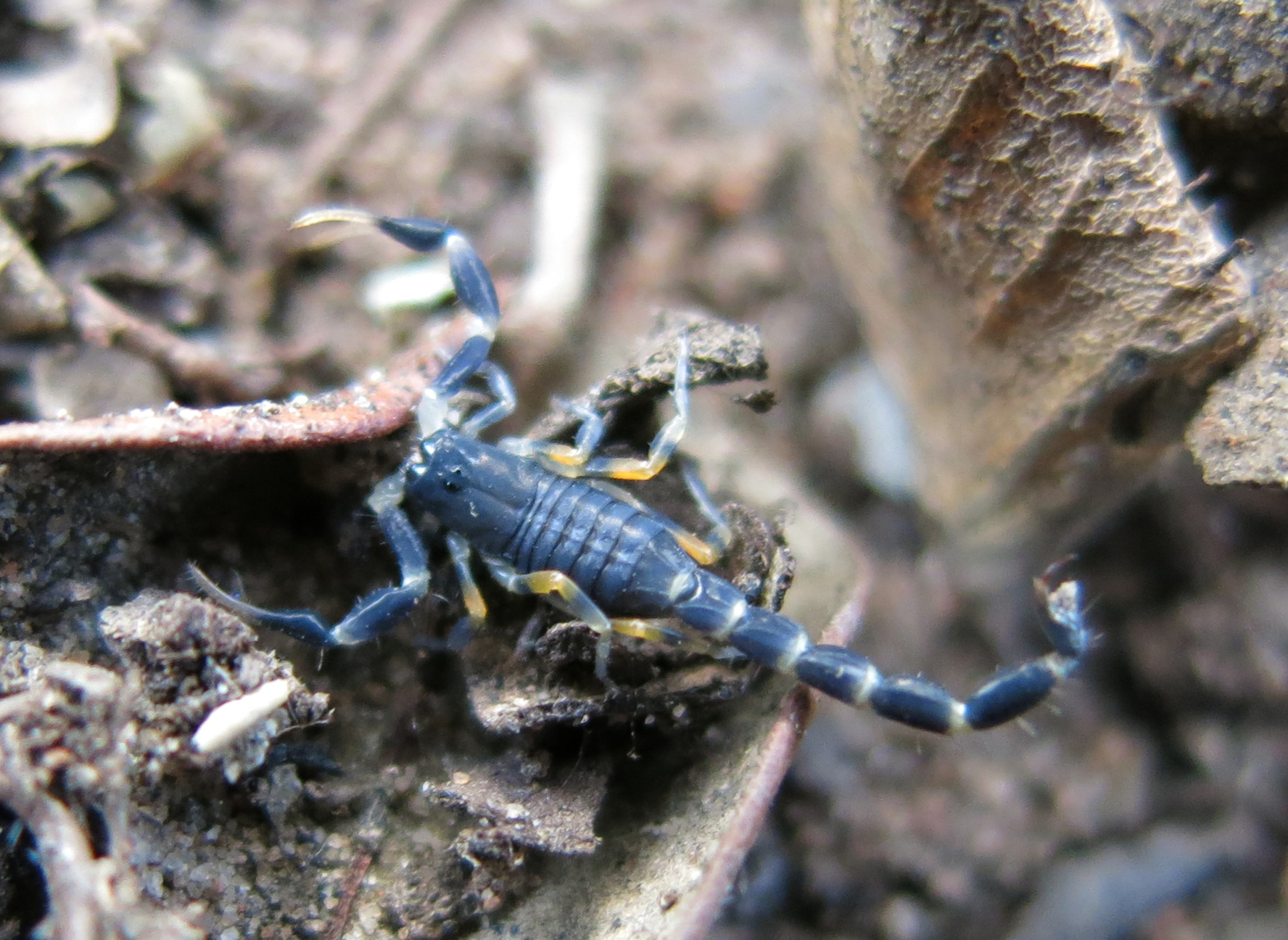
- U. flavoviridis at Pafuri, Kruger National Park
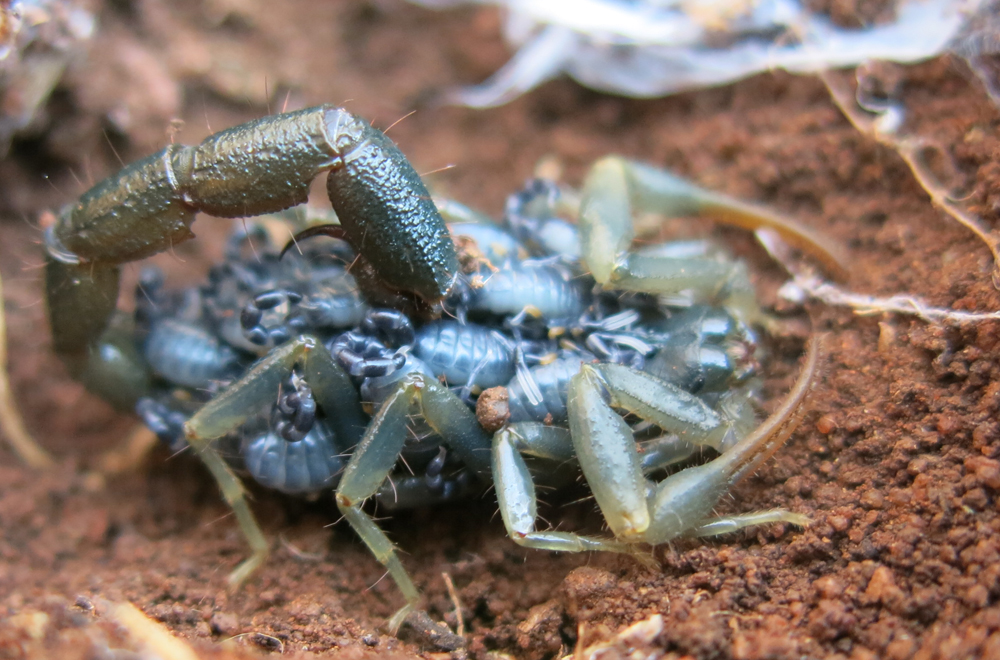
- U. olivaceus with young, Soutpansberg

Scientific classification
- Domain: Eukaryota
- Kingdom: Animalia
- Phylum: Arthropoda
- Subphylum: Chelicerata
- Class: Arachnida
- Order: Scorpiones
- Family: Buthidae
- Genus: Uroplectes; Peters, 1861

Type species
- Uroplectes variegatus Koch, 1844

= Uroplectes =

Genus of scorpions

Uroplectes is a genus of scorpions in the family Buthidae. They are known commonly as the lesser thick-tailed scorpions. There are about 40 species distributed in the Afrotropical realm. They are most diverse in South Africa.

These scorpions are generally about 3 to 6 centimeters long, but a few are smaller, such as U. ansiedippenaarae, which is less than 2 centimeters in length. They are variable in color from bright yellows to muted greens. They occur in many types of habitat from mountain forests to deserts. They live under rocks and in trees, and are sometimes seen invading houses.

Species include:

- Uroplectes ansiedippenaarae Prendini, 2015
- Uroplectes carinatus (Pocock, 1890)
- Uroplectes chubbi Hirst, 1911
- Uroplectes fischeri (Karsch, 1879)
- Uroplectes flavoviridis Peters, 1861
- Uroplectes formosus Pocock, 1890
- Uroplectes gracilior Hewitt, 1914
- Uroplectes insignis Pocock, 1890
- Uroplectes katangensis Prendini, 2015
- Uroplectes lineatus (C. L. Koch, 1844)
- Uroplectes longimanus Werner, 1936
- Uroplectes malawicus Prendini, 2015
- Uroplectes marlothi Purcell, 1901
- Uroplectes ngangelarum Monard, 1930
- Uroplectes occidentalis Simon, 1876
- Uroplectes olivaceus Pocock, 1896
- Uroplectes otjimbinguensis (Karsch, 1879)
- Uroplectes pardalis Werner, 1913
- Uroplectes pardii Kovarik, 2003
- Uroplectes pictus Werner, 1913
- Uroplectes pilosus (Thorell, 1876)
- Uroplectes planimanus (Karsch, 1879)
- Uroplectes schlechteri Purcell, 1901
- Uroplectes schubotzi Kraepelin, 1929
- Uroplectes silvestrii Borelli, 1913
- Uroplectes teretipes Lawrence, 1966
- Uroplectes triangulifer (Thorell, 1876)
- Uroplectes tumidimanus Lamoral, 1979
- Uroplectes variegatus (C. L. Koch, 1844)
- Uroplectes vittatus (Thorell, 1876)
- Uroplectes xanthogrammus Pocock, 1897
- Uroplectes zambezicus Prendini, 2015
