= Chlorotoxin =

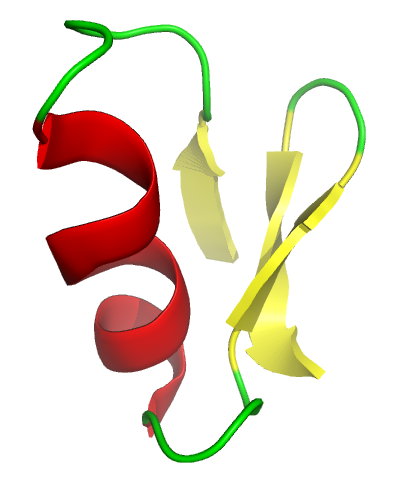

Names
- IUPAC name L-methionyl-L-cysteinyl-L-methionyl-L-prolyl-L-cysteinyl-L-phenylalanyl-L-threonyl-L-threonyl-L-.alpha.-aspartyl-L-histidyl-L-glutaminyl-L-methionyl-L-alanyl-L-arginyl-L-lysyl-L-cysteinyl-L-α-aspartyl-L-α-aspartyl-L-cysteinyl-L-cysteinylglycylglycyl-L-lysylglycyl-L-arginylglycyl-L-lysyl-L-cysteinyl-L-tyrosylglycyl-L-prolyl-L-glutaminyl-L-cysteinyl-L-leucyl-L-cysteinyl-L-argininamide, cyclic (219),(528),(1633),(2035)-tetrakis(disulfide)
- Other names MCMPCFTTDHQMARKCDDCCGGKGRGKCYGPQCLCR

Identifiers
CAS Number	163515-35-3
3D model (JSmol)	Interactive image
ChemSpider	57582614
PubChem CID	86278273
UNII	06UV5RFW57
CompTox Dashboard (EPA)	DTXSID70897247
- InChI: InChI=1S/C158H249N53O47S11/c1-77(2)55-96-138(241)205-105(144(247)186-86(125(165)228)28-18-47-173-156(166)167)70-264-262-68-103-131(234)177-63-115(217)176-64-116(218)183-87(25-12-15-44-159)128(231)178-65-117(219)184-88(29-19-48-174-157(168)169)129(232)179-66-118(220)185-89(26-13-16-45-160)133(236)202-107-72-267-269-75-110-149(252)195-98(56-81-23-10-9-11-24-81)143(246)208-124(80(5)213)154(257)209-123(79(4)212)153(256)199-102(61-122(226)227)141(244)196-99(58-83-62-172-76-181-83)139(242)189-92(37-39-113(163)215)136(239)190-94(42-53-260-7)132(235)182-78(3)126(229)187-91(30-20-49-175-158(170)171)134(237)188-90(27-14-17-46-161)135(238)203-108(73-266-265-71-106(146(249)193-96)204-137(240)93(38-40-114(164)216)191-151(254)111-31-21-50-210(111)119(221)67-180-130(233)97(194-147(107)250)57-82-33-35-84(214)36-34-82)148(251)198-100(59-120(222)223)140(243)197-101(60-121(224)225)142(245)206-109(150(253)201-103)74-268-263-69-104(200-127(230)85(162)41-52-259-6)145(248)192-95(43-54-261-8)155(258)211-51-22-32-112(211)152(255)207-110/h9-11,23-24,33-36,62,76-80,85-112,123-124,212-214H,12-22,25-32,37-61,63-75,159-162H2,1-8H3,(H2,163,215)(H2,164,216)(H2,165,228)(H,172,181)(H,176,217)(H,177,234)(H,178,231)(H,179,232)(H,180,233)(H,182,235)(H,183,218)(H,184,219)(H,185,220)(H,186,247)(H,187,229)(H,188,237)(H,189,242)(H,190,239)(H,191,254)(H,192,248)(H,193,249)(H,194,250)(H,195,252)(H,196,244)(H,197,243)(H,198,251)(H,199,256)(H,200,230)(H,201,253)(H,202,236)(H,203,238)(H,204,240)(H,205,241)(H,206,245)(H,207,255)(H,208,246)(H,209,257)(H,222,223)(H,224,225)(H,226,227)(H4,166,167,173)(H4,168,169,174)(H4,170,171,175)/t78-,79+,80+,85-,86-,87-,88-,89-,90-,91-,92-,93-,94-,95-,96-,97-,98-,99-,100-,101-,102-,103-,104-,105-,106-,107-,108-,109-,110-,111-,112-,123-,124-/m0/s1 Key: QPAKKWCQMHUHNI-GQIQPHNSSA-N
- SMILES: C[C@H]1C(=O)N[C@H](C(=O)N[C@H](C(=O)N[C@H]2CSSC[C@H]3C(=O)N[C@H](C(=O)N[C@@H](CSSC[C@H]4C(=O)NCC(=O)NCC(=O)N[C@H](C(=O)NCC(=O)N[C@H](C(=O)NCC(=O)N[C@H](C(=O)N[C@@H](CSSC[C@@H](C(=O)N[C@H](C(=O)N[C@H](C(=O)N[C@H](C(=O)N[C@H](C(=O)N[C@H](C(=O)N[C@H](C(=O)N[C@H](C(=O)N1)CCSC)CCC(=O)N)CC5=CNC=N5)CC(=O)O)[C@@H](C)O)[C@@H](C)O)CC6=CC=CC=C6)NC(=O)[C@@H]7CCCN7C(=O)[C@@H](NC(=O)[C@H](CSSC[C@@H](C(=O)N4)NC(=O)[C@@H](NC(=O)[C@@H](NC2=O)CC(=O)O)CC(=O)O)NC(=O)[C@H](CCSC)N)CCSC)C(=O)N[C@H](C(=O)NCC(=O)N8CCC[C@H]8C(=O)N[C@H](C(=O)N3)CCC(=O)N)CC9=CC=C(C=C9)O)CCCCN)CCCNC(=N)N)CCCCN)C(=O)N[C@@H](CCCNC(=N)N)C(=O)N)CC(C)C)CCCCN)CCCNC(=N)N

Properties
Chemical formula	C_{158}H_{249}N_{53}O_{47}S_{11}
Molar mass	3995.71 g·mol^{−1}
- Except where otherwise noted, data are given for materials in their standard state (at 25 °C [77 °F], 100 kPa). verify (what is ?) Infobox references

Chlorotoxin is a 36-amino acid peptide found in the venom of the deathstalker scorpion (Leiurus quinquestriatus) which blocks small-conductance chloride channels. The fact that chlorotoxin binds preferentially to glioma cells has allowed the development of methods for the treatment and diagnosis of several types of cancer.

== Sources ==
Chlorotoxin can be purified from crude leiurus, which belongs to the scorpion toxin protein superfamily.

== Chemistry ==
Chlorotoxin is a small toxin and at pH 7 is highly positively charged. It is a peptide consisting of 36 amino acids, with 8 cysteines forming 4 disulfide bonds. Chlorotoxin has a considerable sequence homology to the class of small insectotoxins.

== Target ==
Chlorotoxin is the first reported high-affinity peptide ligand for Cl^{−} channels and it blocks small conductance chloride channels. Each chloride channel can be closed by only one ligand molecule.

Using a recombinant chlorotoxin it was demonstrated that chlorotoxin specifically and selectively interacts with MMP-2 isoforms which are specifically upregulated in gliomas and related cancers, but are not normally expressed in brain.

== Toxicity ==
Chlorotoxin immobilizes the envenomed prey. Duration of paralysis depends on the amount of chlorotoxin injected. In crayfish, chlorotoxin at 1.23-2.23 μg/g body wt produced a loss of motor control beginning about 20 seconds after injection which progressed to a rigid paralysis of the walking and pincer legs that was complete about forty seconds later. Within ±90 s of injection the tail musculature was immobilized. No recovery was noted for 6 hours, at which time the crayfish were destroyed. At 0.5 μg/g, chlorotoxin induced the same progressive paralysis with a slower onset. Recovery of crayfish was noted after 2 hours. The injection on insects produced similar results to those observed in crayfish.

== Possible therapeutic use ==
The fact that chlorotoxin binds preferentially to glioma cells compared with non-neoplastic cells or normal brain has allowed the development of new methods for the treatment and diagnosis of several types of cancer.

Chlorotoxin has the ability to interact with chloride channels in membrane protein in glioma cells, so this prevents transmembrane chloride fluxes but this interaction does not happen for the neurons and normal glial cells. This suggests a potential treatment for cancer.

A report showed the anti-invasive effect of chlorotoxin on glioma cells mediated by its interaction with MMP-2, which allows the penetration of normal and tumor cells through tissue barriers. Chlorotoxin exerts a dual effect on MMP-2: it inhibits the enzymatic activity of MMP-2 and causes a reduction in the surface expression of MMP-2. This result implies the use of chlorotoxin as a highly effective drug of therapeutic potential for diseases that involve the activity of MMP-2.

TM-601 which is the synthetic version of chlorotoxin is under phase II clinical trial. Iodine-131-TM-601 is used to treat malignant glioma. TM-601 is also a candidate for targeting gliomas because it crosses blood-brain and tissue barriers and binds to malignant brain tumor cells without affecting healthy tissue.

Phase II trials are being conducted on the use of chlorotoxin for imaging and radio therapy in glioma.

Chlorotoxin:Cy5.5 (CTX:Cy5.5), which is a bioconjugate of chlorotoxin and a fluorescent dye named Cy5.5, was used by researchers at Seattle Children's Hospital Research Institute and Fred Hutchinson Cancer Research Center to distinguish cancer cells from the surrounding normal cells. This could enable surgeons to remove cancerous cells without injuring the surrounding healthy tissue. CTX:Cy5.5 is a fluorescent molecule emitting photons in the near infrared spectrum and hence can be visualized in the operating room with the aid of infrared glasses. Studies in mouse models have shown that CTX:Cy5.5 can identify tumors with as few as 2000 cancer cells, making it 500 times more sensitive than MRI. Treated animals exhibited no neurologic or behavioral deficits, and postmortem studies revealed no evidence of neuropathy. In 2015, clinical trials were beginning for this "Tumor Paint."

== In popular culture ==
In the episode "Both Sides Now" of medical drama House, House suggests using a scorpion derived toxin to paint the pancreas and view it under infrared light to look for tumors too small to detect by MRI.
