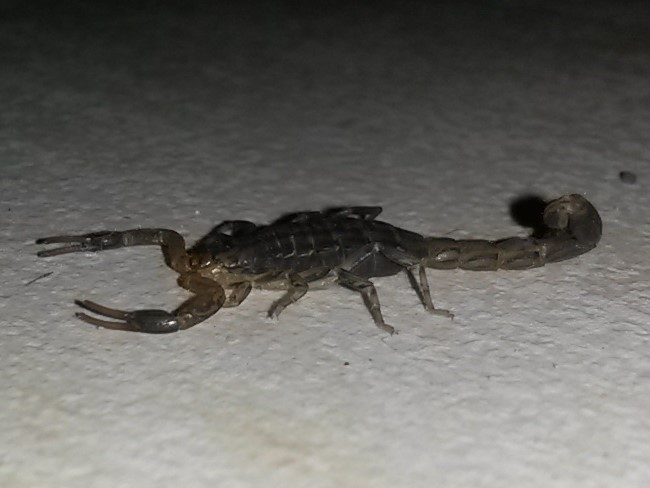

Scientific classification
- Domain: Eukaryota
- Kingdom: Animalia
- Phylum: Arthropoda
- Subphylum: Chelicerata
- Class: Arachnida
- Order: Scorpiones
- Family: Buthidae
- Genus: Uroplectes
- Species: U. lineatus

Binomial name
- Uroplectes lineatus (Koch, 1844)

= Uroplectes lineatus =

Species of scorpion

Uroplectes lineatus is a species of scorpion, endemic to the Western Cape of South Africa. U. lineatus is noted for is a clinically important venom.
