= BmKTX =

BmKTX (alpha-KTx 3.6) is a scorpion neurotoxin which blocks the voltage gated potassium channel K_{v}1.3.

== Etymology and source ==
The name BmK part of the toxin is derived from the name of the scorpion, Buthus martensi (Karsch). KTX also stands for the Kaliotoxin family, which this toxin is a part of. BmKTX is one of the toxins present in the venom of scorpion, found in mostly Mongolia, Korea and China.

== Chemistry ==
=== Homology ===
BmKTX belongs to the α-KTX family, more specifically, the α-KTX subfamily 3, both in terms of primary and 3D structure. The venom of this scorpion has led to the discovery of 77 different peptides, mainly related to ion channel toxins. Out of these toxins there are 14 short chain toxins, composed of 30–40 amino acid residues, homologous to BmKTX. All these toxins, although being short peptides, are encoded by individual cDNAs, instead of originating from cleavage of a common precursor.

=== Structure ===
The toxin consists of multiple parts. The N- and C- terminals are more disordered compared to the rest of the structure. A 2-turn α-helix, runs from residues 14-20. The conformation is less defined for the preceding residues; residues 11 and 12 classified as a turn, and residue 13 is classified as an extended α-helix. The α helix is connected to a β sheet through an αβ3 turn. The β-sheet is antiparallel, running from G25 to C27, and from C32 to C34. The β strands are connected by a type I β turn. The peptide at the N-terminal acts as the third strand of the β -sheet, despite there not being any hydrogen bonding binding it to the β sheets.

== Target and mode of action ==
BmKTX blocks voltage gated 1.3 potassium channels (K_{V}1.3) with an IC_{50} of 0.2 ± 0.01 nM. This channel is essential in cell proliferation and apoptosis. The toxins homologous to BmKTX classically have two ways of binding to voltage gated potassium channels. The first is the involvement of the antiparallel β -sheets that recognize the potassium channels. The second method involves the α -helical domain that recognizes the potassium channels. The common factor in these homologous toxins is that the conserved Lys26 is the residue that physically blocks the pore from the extracellular side of the potassium channels. BmKTX has the special property that it has an Asp33 that gets repelled by the four Asp402 of the potassium channel. This causes the toxin to rotate, moving the Lys26 out of the plane of the potassium channel pore. Because of the synergy effect of the Asp33 and Asp19 of the toxin, Arg23 gets aligned to physically block the pore. This substitution of Arg23 instead of Lys26 can be defined as a third non-classical method of channel blocking, as Arg23 is located between the α helix and the anti-parallel -sheets.

== Toxicity ==
The LD_{50} of BMTX in mice is 95.1 ng.
