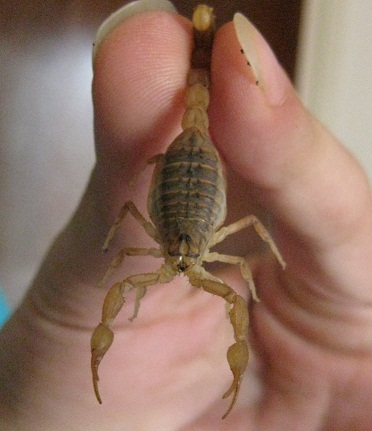

Scientific classification
- Kingdom: Animalia
- Phylum: Arthropoda
- Subphylum: Chelicerata
- Class: Arachnida
- Order: Scorpiones
- Family: Buthidae
- Genus: Mesobuthus
- Species: M. eupeus

Binomial name
- Mesobuthus eupeus (Koch, 1839)

Synonyms
- Buthus eupeus Koch, 1839

= Mesobuthus eupeus =

Species of scorpion

Mesobuthus eupeus is a polymorphic scorpion species belonging to the well-known family Buthidae. Commonly known as the lesser Asian scorpion or the mottled scorpion. It is thought to be the most widely dispersed species of the genus Mesobuthus, perhaps even of the family Buthidae.

== Description ==
M. eupeus can reach a size of 4 to 5 centimetres (1.6 to 2.0 in) in length. The entire body is yellow to yellowish brown. The dorsal segments (tergites) of the mesosoma often have longitudinal irregular stripes that are black to dark brown. They exhibit sexual dimorphism, the adult females being generally larger than males but have a lower number of pectinal teeth (16 to 23, as opposed to 22 to 28 in males).

The pedipalps of M. eupeus have a maximum of ten diagonal rows of granules on the fixed finger and eleven on the movable finger. The pedipalp chelae (pincers) are wider than the patella (segment IV). The segments of the metasoma are thick and have eight keels (octocarinate). The telson is subglobose with a flat dorsal surface.

== Taxonomy ==
M. eupeus were first described by the German arachnologist Carl Ludwig Koch in 1839. It is classified under the genus Mesobuthus and belongs to the largest family of scorpions, the thick-tailed scorpion family Buthidae. Currently, more than 23 subspecies of M. eupeus are recognized.

== Ecology ==
M. eupeus feed on small insects such as crickets or small cockroaches. Cannibalism is very rare in this species. They do not dig burrows and prefer using natural spaces and burrows under stones and other objects. They have slender pedipalps so they usually rely on their stings for killing their prey.

== Venom ==
The venom of M. eupeus is not as potent as that of other dangerous buthid species. Victims of stings feel intense pain, hyperemia, swelling and a burning sensation in the affected area, while numbness and itching were also reported in some cases.

As in other scorpions, the venom of M. eupeus contains various neurotoxic proteins that interact specifically with ion channels. A number of unique proteins in this scorpion's venom have been identified, cloned and investigated for clinical applications. For instance, MeuKTX, structurally related to BmKTX (α-KTx3.6) from M. martensii, potently inhibits rKv1.1, rKv1.2 and hKv1.3 channels but does not affect rKv1.4, rKv1.5, hKv3.1, rKv4.3, and hERG channels even at high concentrations. In contrast, BeKm-1 specifically inhibits hERG channels, which are potassium channels critical to maintaining normal electrical activities in the heart, but showed no effects on various other potassium channels tested. Inhibitors of sodium channels have also been found in this venom. MeuNaTxa-12 and MeuNaTxa-13 can affect cloned mammalian Nav subtypes rNav1.1, rNav1.2, rNav1.4 and mNav1.6, but not rNav1.5. In vivo assays showed that these two toxins have potential to be insecticidal agents, with MeuNaTxa-12 having 5-fold higher toxicity than MeuNaTxa-13.

A number of antimicrobial peptides have also been found in the venom of M. eupeus. Meucin-13 and Meucin-18 exhibited extensive cytolytic effects on bacteria, fungi and yeasts. Furthermore, Meucin-24 and Meucin-25, first identified from genetic sequences expressed in their venom gland, were shown to selectively kill Plasmodium falciparum and inhibit the development of Plasmodium berghei, both malaria parasites, but do not harm mammalian cells. These two venom-derived proteins are therefore attractive candidates for the development of anti-malarial drugs.

== Habitat and distribution ==
Mesobuthus eupeus mostly lives in arid or semi-arid habitats with little or no vegetation. Its geographical distributions consists of eastern Turkey, Armenia, Azerbaijan, Georgia, southern Russia, northern Syria, eastern Iraq, Iran, Afghanistan, Pakistan, Turkmenistan, Uzbekistan, Kyrgyzstan, Tajikistan, Kazakhstan, Australia, southern Mongolia and northern China.

== List of subspecies ==
- Mesobuthus eupeus eupeus (C. L. Koch, 1839)
- Mesobuthus eupeus afghanus (Pocock, 1889)
- Mesobuthus eupeus barszczewskii (Birula, 1904)
- Mesobuthus eupeus bogdoensis (Birula, 1896)
- Mesobuthus eupeus haarlovi Vachon, 1958
- Mesobuthus eupeus iranus (Birula, 1917)
- Mesobuthus eupeus kirmanensis (Birula, 1900)
- Mesobuthus eupeus mesopotamicus (Penther, 1912)
- Mesobuthus eupeus mongolicus (Birula, 1911)
- Mesobuthus eupeus pachysoma (Birula, 1900)
- Mesobuthus eupeus persicus (Pocock, 1899)
- Mesobuthus eupeus philippovitschi (Birula, 1905)
- Mesobuthus eupeus thersites (C. L. Koch, 1839)

== See also ==
- Mesobuthus martensii
- Hottentotta tamulus
- Scorpion toxin
- Deathstalker
