= Hadrurus anzaborrego =

Scientific classification
- Kingdom: Animalia
- Phylum: Arthropoda
- Subphylum: Chelicerata
- Class: Arachnida
- Order: Scorpiones
- Family: Hadruridae
- Genus: Hadrurus
- Species: H. anzaborrego

Binomial name
- Hadrurus anzaborrego Soleglad, Fet & Lowe, 2011;

Species of scorpion

Hadrurus anzaborrego is a large scorpion endemic to the western Colorado desert of southern California and extreme northern Baja California.

== Description ==
H. anzaborrego is a medium sized Hadrurus species, reaching up to 11 cm (4.3 in) long. Two color phenotypes are present. Light individuals are overwhelmingly pale yellow while dark individuals bear a melanic posterior carapace and mesosoma. Both phenotypes express a dark, v-shaped pattern near the eyes.

== Range ==
H. anzaborrego is endemic to the western Colorado desert where it occurs from Joshua Tree National Park south to the eastern Sierra de Juárez in extreme northern Baja California. It has been recorded at elevations ranging from 163 m (535 ft) to 915 m (3,002 ft). The holotype was collected around Anza-Borrego Desert State Park, from which the taxonomic name is derived. Near Borrego Springs, CA it is sympatric with Hadrurus arizonensis. H. anzaborrego prefers coarser sand and rockier sites than H. arizonensis.
