= Fauna of Nevada =

Native animals of Nevada

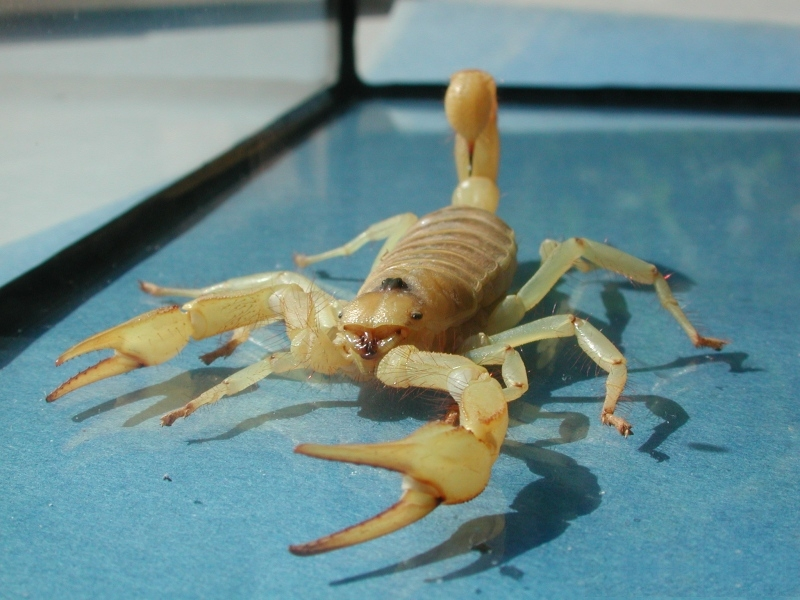
The giant hairy scorpion is the largest scorpion in North America and is one of the 23 species of scorpion in Nevada.

The fauna of the U.S. state of Nevada is mostly species adapted to desert, temperature extremes and to lack of moisture. With an average annual rainfall of only about 7 inches (180 mm), Nevada is the driest – and has the largest percentage of its total area classified as desert – of all states in the United States. Two-thirds of the state is located within the largest desert on the North American continent, the Great Basin Desert, while the lower one-third is the Mojave Desert.

The smaller Smoke Creek Desert and Black Rock Desert are located in the northwest, while other deserts include the Y P Desert, Tule Desert, Forty Mile Desert, Owyhee Desert and the Amargosa Desert. Nevada is located within the Nearctic faunistic realm in a region containing an assemblage of species similar to Northern Africa.

Animals in Nevada include scorpions, mountain lions, snakes, lizards, spiders, wolves, coyotes, foxes, ground squirrels, rabbits, falcons, ravens, desert tortoise, hawks, eagles, bobcats, sheep, deer, pronghorns, geckos, owls, bats and horned toads. Nevada's rivers and lakes contain bass, trout, crappie and catfish.

== Avifauna ==
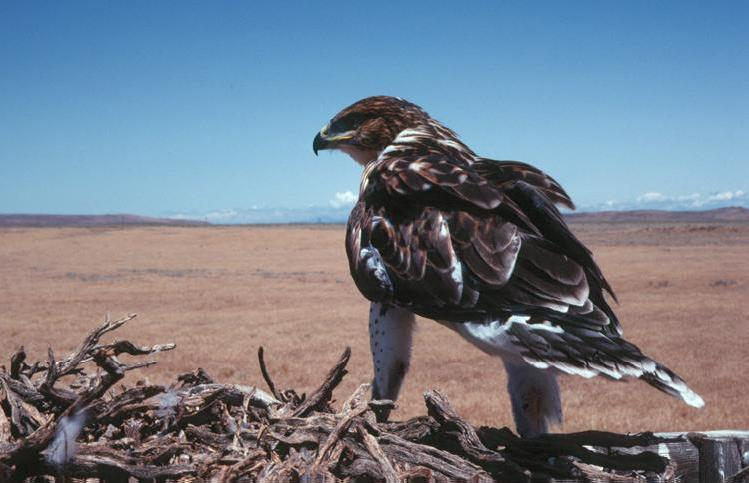
A dark-morph ferruginous hawk on nest.

More than 480 species of birds have been recorded in Nevada, and of these, 300 either nest or occur with regularity in the state. The majority of Nevada's breeding birds are landbirds, but a large percentage of the priority species are shorebirds and waterbirds, reflecting the importance of water bodies in the desert. 78 species of Nevadan birds are currently identified as priority species. These birds are subdivided into 70 conservation priority species, five stewardship species, and three special status species.

The 70 conservation priority species were identified as high priorities in one or more bird conservation initiatives. Most conservation priority species were designated as such by regional initiatives because of population declines, significant threats, dependence on restricted or threatened habitats, or small population size. Three species that were not ranked by regional initiatives (American goshawk, ferruginous hawk and golden eagle) were included as conservation priority species based on current concerns in Nevada and agency priorities.

Bird species in the state include the American bald eagle, New World vulture, peregrine falcon, American goshawk, red-tailed hawk, American white pelican, northern phainopepla, great horned owl, burrowing owl, golden eagle, prairie falcon, greater roadrunner, canyon wren, Gambel's quail, house finch, Harris's hawk, common gallinule, curlew sandpiper, common black-hawk, zone-tailed hawk, red crossbill, northern cardinal, red-faced cormorant, sooty grouse, wild turkey, northern harrier, American bittern, red-shouldered hawk, ferruginous hawk, broad-winged hawk, Cooper's hawk, elf owl, gyrfalcon, sharp-shinned hawk and many more. The mountain bluebird is the official state bird.

== Mammals ==
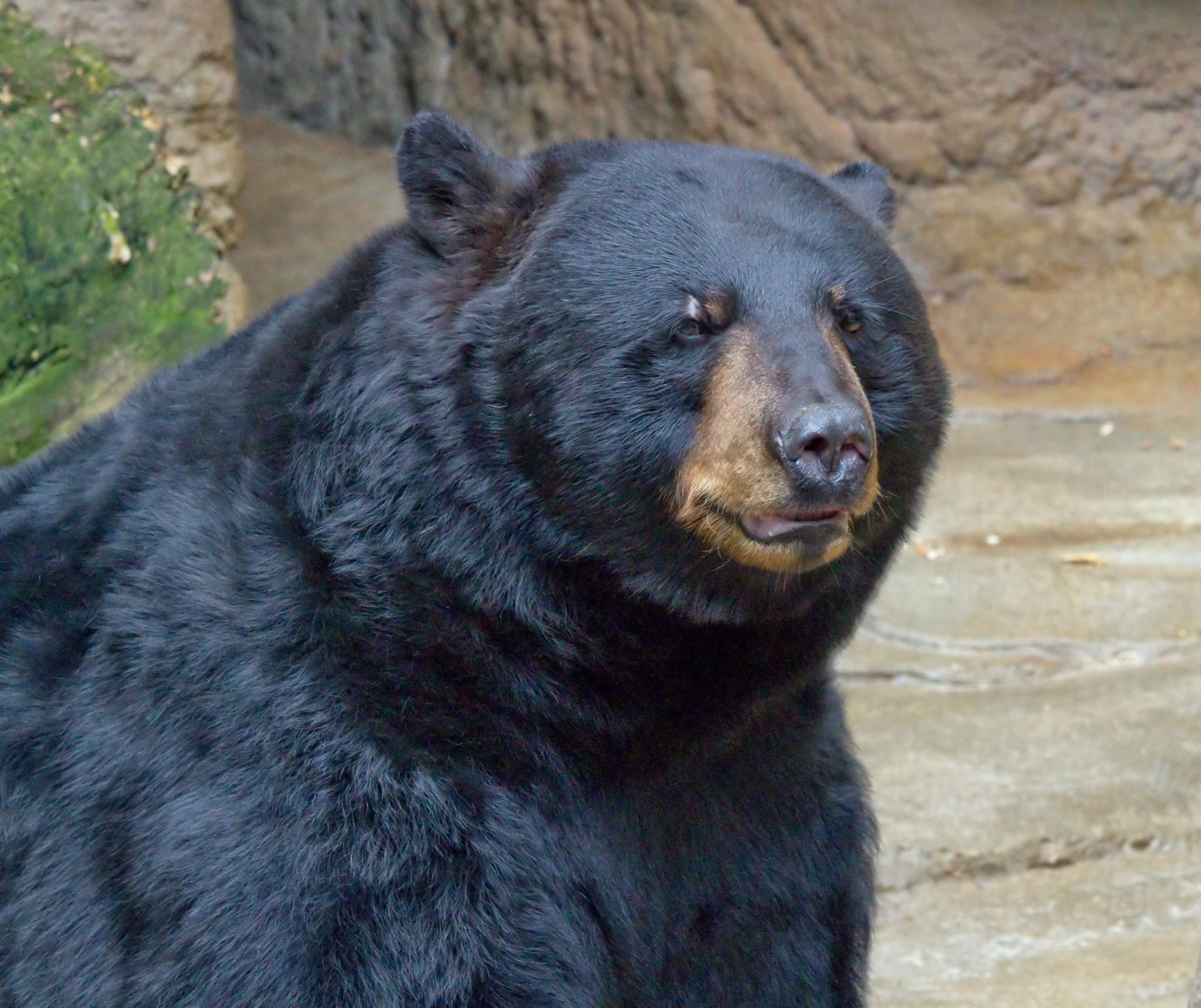
More than 250 American black bears live on the Nevadan side of Lake Tahoe.

More than 61 species of mammals live in Nevada, and live in the greener northwestern parts of the state. While most of the state has mammals adapted to the dry desert climate, the area around Lake Tahoe and Pyramid Lake has forests habitable for American black bears, beavers, otters, skunks and raccoons.

The desert bighorn sheep is the official state animal and is found in most of Nevada's mountainous desert. The desert bighorn is smaller than the Rocky Mountain bighorn sheep but has a wider horn spread. The population of desert bighorn sheep are blooming; while it was 1500 in 1960, the population has increased to almost 5300 by the 1990s. The mountain bighorn sheep can go for extended periods of time without drinking water. With their unique padded hooves, bighorns are able to climb the steep terrain of the Nevadan desert. Desert bighorn sheep also have keen eyesight to detect predators such as bobcats, mountain lions and coyotes.

Other mammals in Nevada are the Merriam's shrew, white-tailed antelope squirrel, cactus mouse, gray fox, mustang horse, kit fox, kangaroo rat, mountain cottontail, desert bighorn sheep, pack rat, Townsend's big-eared bat, coyotes, collared peccary, Rocky Mountain goat, pronghorn, wild donkeys, mountain lion, raccoons, Ring-tailed cat, American black bear, striped skunk, short-tailed weasel, badger, lynx, Sierra Nevada red fox, grey wolf, western jumping mouse, lodgepole chipmunk, American beaver, Yuma bat, and several others.

== Arachnids ==
The scorpions of Nevada are well represented by four main families: Buthidae, Caraboctonidae, Vaejovidae and the intriguingly named Superstitioniidae. Nevada has 23 species of scorpion, including Centruroides sculpturatus, one of many species referred to as a bark scorpion. Other species of scorpion include the giant desert hairy scorpion, and Hadrurus spadix. Nevada's hot climate makes it an ideal state for certain spiders to live. Spiders include Carolina wolf spider, jumping spider, funnel-weaving spider, crab spider, black widow and tarantula.

== Reptiles ==
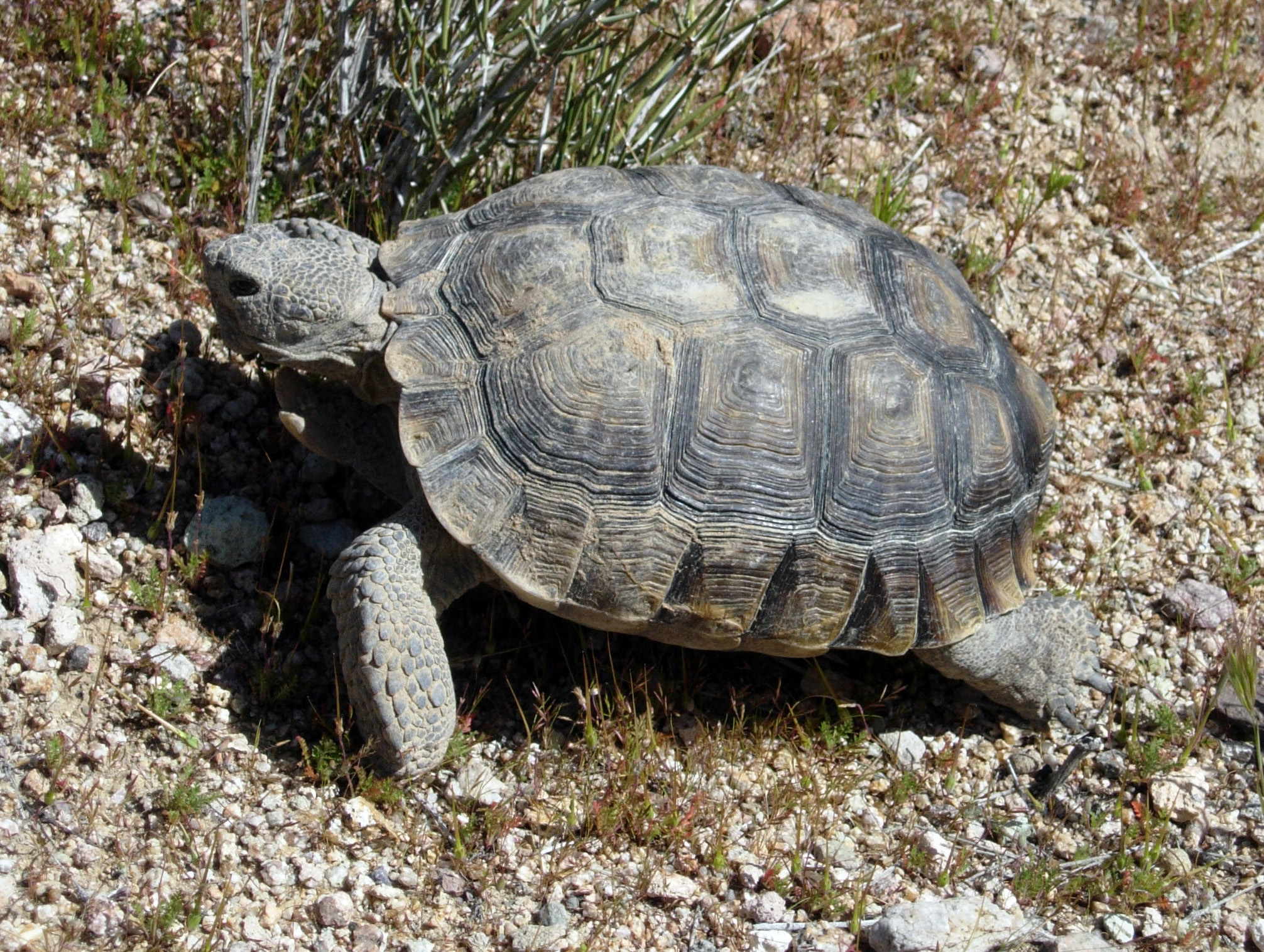
The desert tortoise is a native of the Mojave Desert in Southern Nevada.

More than 52 registered species of reptiles live in Nevada, where 12 are considered venomous and an additional 6 are considered dangerous. Venomous species of snakes include the sidewinder, western diamondback, and the Great Basin rattlesnakes. Other species of reptiles include the venomous Gila monster, northern desert horned lizard, sagebrush lizard, leopard lizard, western fence lizard, short-horned lizard and the Nevadan official state reptile: the threatened desert tortoise.

The desert tortoise, which can live up to seventy years, is found in southwestern Nevada and is the largest reptile in the southwestern United States. In parts of the state, the population has decreased thirty to fifty percent due to predation, disease, vandalism and illegal collection by humans.

== Fish ==
Nevada has 48 species of fish living in its 600 rivers and more than 200 lakes. Large lakes with several species of fish include for instance Pyramid Lake, Lake Tahoe, Lake Mead, Lake Mohave, Franklin Lake and Walker Lake. At least 12 of Nevada's fishes are endemic to Nevada waters – they occur here and exist nowhere else in the world. Examples of endemic Nevadan fish are Devil's Hole pupfish in Devils Hole, moapa dace in Muddy River and the Cui-ui in Pyramid Lake and Truckee River.

The Lahontan cutthroat trout is the official state fish and a native trout found in 14 of the State's 17 counties. Fish species in Nevada include mountain whitefish, Great Basin redband trout, bull trout, Yellowstone cutthroat trout, Bonneville cutthroat trout, Lahontan cutthroat trout, rainbow trout, largemouth bass, Small Mouthed Bass, channel catfish, striped bass, bullhead catfish, crappie, green sunfish, bluegill sunfish, carps, humpback chub, razor back sucker, bonytail chub and Colorado squawfish.

== Amphibians ==
Amphibians in Nevada include the tiger salamander, western toad, Great Basin spadefoot, bullfrog, Columbia spotted frog, northern leopard frog, Woodhouse's toad, Amargosa toad, southwestern toad and several other species of toad, frog and salamander.

== See also ==
- Fauna of the United States
