= HgeTx1 =

Type of scorpion venom

HgeTx1 (systematic name: α-KTx 6.14) is a toxin produced by the Mexican scorpion Hoffmanihadrurus gertschi that is a reversible blocker of the Shaker B K^{+}-channel, a type of voltage-gated potassium channels.

== Etymology and Source ==
The toxin HgeTx1 is produced by the Mexican scorpion Hoffmanihadrurus gertschi, which belongs to the family of Caraboctonidae. HgeTx1 is the first toxin (Tx1) from this scorpion (Hge). HgeTx1 belongs to the α-KTx potassium channel toxin category, and is placed in the sixth subfamily of all α-KTx toxins where HgeTx1 is the fourteenth member, which gives HgeTx1 its systematic name α-KTx 6.14.

== Chemical Structure ==
All α-KTx category toxins are peptides that contain between 20 and 40 amino acids and contain three or four disulfide bridges. HgeTx1 consists of 36 amino acids and has four disulfide bridges. These disulfide bridges exist between Cys1–Cys5, Cys2–Cys6, Cys3–Cys7 and Cys4–Cys8. It has a molecular mass of 3950 atomic mass units.

== Target ==
Electrophysiological experiments (whole cell configuration patch clamping) have been performed to investigate the physiological effect of HgeTx1 on Shaker B K^{+}-channels in insect cell cultures. These recordings show that HgeTx1 reversibly blocks the Shaker B K^{+}-channel. This blockage follows a Michaelis-Menten saturation relationship with a Kd of 52 nM. However, there is no report of selectivity for or blockage of other subtypes of K^{+}-channels.

== Mode of action ==
HgeTx1 has only been investigated for its effectiveness on the Shaker B K^{+}-channel, where the toxin seems to work as a plug that blocks the pore's ion conductance. This blockage follows the functional dyad model that underlies most α-KTx toxins. In the functional dyad model, a lysine residue interacts with a hydrophobic Leu, Tyr, Met or Phe residue, in order to recognize the K^{+}-channel. On the extracellular side of the channel, the side-chain of the lysine residue will enter the pore and subsequently block the channel. In HgeTx1, it seems likely that the Lys24 residue will interact with the hydrophobic Met33 or Leu34 residue according to the functional dyad model, which allows it to block the Shaker B K^{+}-channel.

== Toxicity ==
Scorpions of the family Caraboctonidae, each of which produce a cocktail of different toxins, are not considered dangerous to humans.
