= Hg1 (toxin) =

Hg1 scorpion toxin

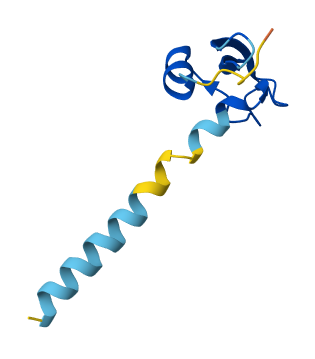
- Ribbon diagram for Hg1

Identifiers
- InChI: InChI=1S/C441H666N124O120S7/c1-37-230(22)350(554-406(654)307(190-330(455)584)540-430(678)354(234(26)41-5)558-413(661)315(212-571)545-433(681)359(243(35)574)562-404(652)285(167-226(14)15)535-424(672)349(229(20)21)552-403(651)284(166-225(12)13)536-428(676)353(233(25)40-4)557-412(660)314(211-570)544-393(641)292(173-248-98-60-48-61-99-248)523-385(633)282(164-223(8)9)495-336(590)203-483-369(617)287(177-252-121-129-260(575)130-122-252)521-391(639)296(175-250-102-64-50-65-103-250)538-431(679)355(235(27)42-6)559-432(680)356(236(28)43-7)553-364(612)264(449)147-163-686-36)426(674)493-240(32)362(610)503-277(138-143-343(598)599)372(620)490-237(29)360(608)477-200-335(589)497-298(181-256-192-466-219-486-256)394(642)529-300(183-258-194-468-221-488-258)396(644)531-303(186-326(451)580)399(647)511-275(117-86-159-474-441(464)465)381(629)551-348(228(18)19)425(673)539-306(189-329(454)583)402(650)548-320-217-691-688-214-317(415(663)505-266(113-82-155-470-437(456)457)366(614)480-201-337(591)496-289(170-245-92-54-45-55-93-245)387(635)510-273(115-84-157-472-439(460)461)374(622)506-269(109-71-78-151-445)375(623)520-286(169-244-90-52-44-53-91-244)368(616)478-196-331(585)475-198-333(587)494-281(436(684)685)112-74-81-154-448)546-378(626)274(116-85-158-473-440(462)463)509-373(621)268(108-70-77-150-444)507-380(628)279(140-145-345(602)603)515-417(665)318-215-689-690-216-319-416(664)512-267(107-69-76-149-443)371(619)491-239(31)363(611)518-297(176-251-104-66-51-67-105-251)405(653)555-352(232(24)39-3)429(677)537-288(178-253-123-131-261(576)132-124-253)370(618)479-197-332(586)476-199-334(588)501-316(414(662)513-276(137-142-342(596)597)367(615)482-202-338(592)498-302(185-325(450)579)398(646)543-313(210-569)411(659)533-305(188-328(453)582)401(649)532-304(187-327(452)581)400(648)526-293(174-249-100-62-49-63-101-249)392(640)542-312(209-568)410(658)514-278(139-144-344(600)601)379(627)508-270(110-72-79-152-446)376(624)528-299(182-257-193-467-220-487-257)395(643)530-301(397(645)547-318)184-259-195-469-222-489-259)213-687-692-218-321(550-420(668)322-118-87-160-563(322)341(595)206-485-423(671)358(242(34)573)560-382(630)271(111-73-80-153-447)516-421(669)323-119-88-161-564(323)435(683)324-120-89-162-565(324)434(682)309(168-227(16)17)541-386(634)283(165-224(10)11)519-419(320)667)418(666)504-265(106-68-75-148-442)365(613)481-204-339(593)499-310(207-566)408(656)527-290(171-246-94-56-46-57-95-246)384(632)492-238(30)361(609)502-272(114-83-156-471-438(458)459)377(625)522-294(179-254-125-133-262(577)134-126-254)388(636)525-295(180-255-127-135-263(578)136-128-255)389(637)524-291(172-247-96-58-47-59-97-247)390(638)534-308(191-347(606)607)407(655)556-351(231(23)38-2)427(675)517-280(141-146-346(604)605)383(631)561-357(241(33)572)422(670)484-205-340(594)500-311(208-567)409(657)549-319/h44-67,90-105,121-136,192-195,219-243,264-324,348-359,566-578H,37-43,68-89,106-120,137-191,196-218,442-449H2,1-36H3,(H2,450,579)(H2,451,580)(H2,452,581)(H2,453,582)(H2,454,583)(H2,455,584)(H,466,486)(H,467,487)(H,468,488)(H,469,489)(H,475,585)(H,476,586)(H,477,608)(H,478,616)(H,479,618)(H,480,614)(H,481,613)(H,482,615)(H,483,617)(H,484,670)(H,485,671)(H,490,620)(H,491,619)(H,492,632)(H,493,674)(H,494,587)(H,495,590)(H,496,591)(H,497,589)(H,498,592)(H,499,593)(H,500,594)(H,501,588)(H,502,609)(H,503,610)(H,504,666)(H,505,663)(H,506,622)(H,507,628)(H,508,627)(H,509,621)(H,510,635)(H,511,647)(H,512,664)(H,513,662)(H,514,658)(H,515,665)(H,516,669)(H,517,675)(H,518,611)(H,519,667)(H,520,623)(H,521,639)(H,522,625)(H,523,633)(H,524,637)(H,525,636)(H,526,648)(H,527,656)(H,528,624)(H,529,642)(H,530,643)(H,531,644)(H,532,649)(H,533,659)(H,534,638)(H,535,672)(H,536,676)(H,537,677)(H,538,679)(H,539,673)(H,540,678)(H,541,634)(H,542,640)(H,543,646)(H,544,641)(H,545,681)(H,546,626)(H,547,645)(H,548,650)(H,549,657)(H,550,668)(H,551,629)(H,552,651)(H,553,612)(H,554,654)(H,555,653)(H,556,655)(H,557,660)(H,558,661)(H,559,680)(H,560,630)(H,561,631)(H,562,652)(H,596,597)(H,598,599)(H,600,601)(H,602,603)(H,604,605)(H,606,607)(H,684,685)(H4,456,457,470)(H4,458,459,471)(H4,460,461,472)(H4,462,463,473)(H4,464,465,474)/t230-,231-,232-,233-,234-,235-,236-,237-,238-,239-,240-,241+,242+,243+,264-,265-,266-,267-,268-,269-,270-,271-,272-,273-,274-,275-,276-,277-,278-,279-,280-,281-,282-,283-,284-,285-,286-,287-,288-,289-,290-,291-,292-,293-,294-,295-,296-,297-,298-,299-,300-,301-,302-,303-,304-,305-,306-,307-,308-,309-,310-,311-,312-,313-,314-,315-,316-,317-,318-,319-,320-,321-,322-,323-,324-,348-,349-,350-,351-,352-,353-,354-,355-,356-,357-,358-,359-/m0/s1
- SMILES: N[C@@]([H])(CCSC)C(=O)N[C@@]([H])([C@]([H])(CC)C)C(=O)N[C@@]([H])([C@]([H])(CC)C)C(=O)N[C@@]([H])(Cc1ccccc1)C(=O)N[C@@]([H])(Cc1ccc(O)cc1)C(=O)NCC(=O)N[C@@]([H])(CC(C)C)C(=O)N[C@@]([H])(Cc1ccccc1)C(=O)N[C@@]([H])(CO)C(=O)N[C@@]([H])([C@]([H])(CC)C)C(=O)N[C@@]([H])(CC(C)C)C(=O)N[C@@]([H])(C(C)C)C(=O)N[C@@]([H])(CC(C)C)C(=O)N[C@@]([H])([C@]([H])(O)C)C(=O)N[C@@]([H])(CO)C(=O)N[C@@]([H])([C@]([H])(CC)C)C(=O)N[C@@]([H])(CC(=O)N)C(=O)N[C@@]([H])([C@]([H])(CC)C)C(=O)N[C@@]([H])(C)C(=O)N[C@@]([H])(CCC(=O)O)C(=O)N[C@@]([H])(C)C(=O)NCC(=O)N[C@@]([H])(CC1=CN=C-N1)C(=O)N[C@@]([H])(CC1=CN=C-N1)C(=O)N[C@@]([H])(CC(=O)N)C(=O)N[C@@]([H])(CCCNC(=N)N)C(=O)N[C@@]([H])(C(C)C)C(=O)N[C@@]([H])(CC(=O)N)C(=O)N[C@@]([H])(CS2)C(=O)N[C@@]([H])(CC(C)C)C(=O)N[C@@]([H])(CC(C)C)C(=O)N1[C@@]([H])(CCC1)C(=O)N1[C@@]([H])(CCC1)C(=O)N[C@@]([H])(CCCCN)C(=O)N[C@@]([H])([C@]([H])(O)C)C(=O)NCC(=O)N1[C@@]([H])(CCC1)C(=O)N[C@@]([H])(CS3)C(=O)N[C@@]([H])(CCCCN)C(=O)NCC(=O)N[C@@]([H])(CO)C(=O)N[C@@]([H])(Cc1ccccc1)C(=O)N[C@@]([H])(C)C(=O)N[C@@]([H])(CCCNC(=N)N)C(=O)N[C@@]([H])(Cc1ccc(O)cc1)C(=O)N[C@@]([H])(Cc1ccc(O)cc1)C(=O)N[C@@]([H])(Cc1ccccc1)C(=O)N[C@@]([H])(CC(=O)O)C(=O)N[C@@]([H])([C@]([H])(CC)C)C(=O)N[C@@]([H])(CCC(=O)O)C(=O)N[C@@]([H])([C@]([H])(O)C)C(=O)NCC(=O)N[C@@]([H])(CO)C(=O)N[C@@]([H])(CS4)C(=O)N[C@@]([H])(CCCCN)C(=O)N[C@@]([H])(C)C(=O)N[C@@]([H])(Cc1ccccc1)C(=O)N[C@@]([H])([C@]([H])(CC)C)C(=O)N[C@@]([H])(Cc1ccc(O)cc1)C(=O)NCC(=O)NCC(=O)N[C@@]([H])(CS3)C(=O)N[C@@]([H])(CCC(=O)O)C(=O)NCC(=O)N[C@@]([H])(CC(=O)N)C(=O)N[C@@]([H])(CO)C(=O)N[C@@]([H])(CC(=O)N)C(=O)N[C@@]([H])(CC(=O)N)C(=O)N[C@@]([H])(Cc1ccccc1)C(=O)N[C@@]([H])(CO)C(=O)N[C@@]([H])(CCC(=O)O)C(=O)N[C@@]([H])(CCCCN)C(=O)N[C@@]([H])(CC1=CN=C-N1)C(=O)N[C@@]([H])(CC1=CN=C-N1)C(=O)N[C@@]([H])(CS4)C(=O)N[C@@]([H])(CCC(=O)O)C(=O)N[C@@]([H])(CCCCN)C(=O)N[C@@]([H])(CCCNC(=N)N)C(=O)N[C@@]([H])(CS2)C(=O)N[C@@]([H])(CCCNC(=N)N)C(=O)NCC(=O)N[C@@]([H])(Cc1ccccc1)C(=O)N[C@@]([H])(CCCNC(=N)N)C(=O)N[C@@]([H])(CCCCN)C(=O)N[C@@]([H])(Cc1ccccc1)C(=O)NCC(=O)NCC(=O)N[C@@]([H])(CCCCN)C(=O)O

Properties
Chemical formula	C_{441}H_{666}N_{124}O_{120}S_{7}
Molar mass	9849.35 g·mol^{−1}
- Except where otherwise noted, data are given for materials in their standard state (at 25 °C [77 °F], 100 kPa). Infobox references

Hg1/Delta-Ktx 1.1

Identifiers
- Organism: Hadrurus gertschi
- Symbol: ?
- Orthologs: OMA: entry
- UniProt: P0C8W3
Search for
- Structures: Swiss-model
- Domains: InterPro

Hg1 (also known as Delta-Ktx 1.1) is a Kunitz-type peptide ion channel toxin derived from the scorpion Hadrurus gertschi. Its mode of action is that it selectively inhibits the potassium channel Kv1.3 and, with a lower affinity, channels Kv1.1 and Kv1.2.

== Etymology and source ==
The Hg1 toxin is named after the Mexican scorpion Hadrurus gertschi that produces it, which belongs to the Caraboctonidae family. This scorpion is also known as Hoffmannihadrurus gertschi. The alternative name of Hg1 is Delta-Ktx 1.1.

== Chemistry ==
Hg1 has a sequence of 88 amino acids with three disulfide bonds between Cys29-Cys79, Cys38-Cys62 and Cys54-Cys75. Hg1 has a molecular weight of 9,855 Da. It belongs to the Kunitz-type potassium channel family toxins. These toxins are classified in three different groups, according to their disulfide bridge pattern. Hg1 is classified as a member of the first group, showing classical disulfide pairing, comparable to the HWTX-XI toxin in spiders, dendrotoxin K in snakes, and APEKTx1 in sea anemones.

=== Amino acid sequence ===
The amino acid sequence of Hg1 is:

MIIFYGLFSILVLTSINIAEAGHHNRVNCLLPPKTGPCKGSFARYYFDIETGSCKAFIYGGCEGNSNNFSEKHHCEKRCRGFRKFGGK

== Target ==
The toxin primarily inhibits voltage-gated potassium channels and is highly selective for channel Kv1.3 with an IC_{50} of 6.2 ± 1.2 nM. With a lower affinity the toxin also inhibits potassium channels Kv1.1 and Kv1.2.

Channel	Reduction in ion channel conductance (1 μM Hg1)
Kv1.1	<50%
Kv1.2	<50%
Kv1.3	≈80%

Similar to other Kunitz-type toxins, recombinant Hg1 was revealed to inhibit the serine protease trypsin (dissociation constant (K_{d}) = 107 nM), having the highest affinity to it compared to other Kunitz-type potassium channel toxins, such as LmKTT-1a (K_{d} = 140 nM), LmKTT-1b (K_{d} = 160 nM), LmKTT-1c (K_{d} = 124 nM), and BmKTT-1 (K_{d} = 136 nM).

== Mode of action ==
Compared to other Kunitz-type toxins that act on potassium channels through their N-terminal regions, alanine-scanning supports that the Hg1 toxin interacts with the Kv1.3 channel through its residues on the C-terminal region. Based on computational modelling, the toxin is thought to inhibit the channel through pore-blocking mechanisms of its Lys-56 residue and hydrophobic interactions between residues of the toxin (Arg-57, Phe-61, Lys-63) and residues of the Kv1.3 channel.
