= Typhlochactas reddelli =

Scientific classification
- Kingdom: Animalia
- Phylum: Arthropoda
- Subphylum: Chelicerata
- Class: Arachnida
- Order: Scorpiones
- Family: Typhlochactidae
- Genus: Typhlochactas
- Species: T. reddelli

Binomial name
- Typhlochactas reddelli Mitchell, 1968

Species of scorpion

Typhlochactas reddelli is a species of scorpion in the family Typhlochactidae. It is known from only four specimens, collected from La Cueva del Ojo de Agua de Tlilapan in Veracruz, Mexico.
