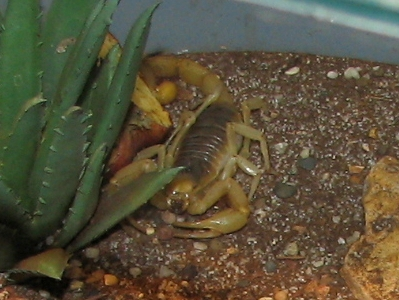

Scientific classification
- Domain: Eukaryota
- Kingdom: Animalia
- Phylum: Arthropoda
- Subphylum: Chelicerata
- Class: Arachnida
- Order: Scorpiones
- Family: Hadruridae
- Genus: Hadrurus
- Species: H. hirsutus

Binomial name
- Hadrurus hirsutus (Wood, 1863)

= Hadrurus hirsutus =

Adding new species of scorpion

Hadrurus hirsutus, also known as the desert hairy scorpion, is a species of scorpion in the Hadruridae family. It was first described by Horatio C. Wood Jr. in 1863.

== Distribution ==
This species is endemic to the state of Baja California Sur in Mexico.

== Description ==
The male specimen described by Williams in 1970 measured 107.4 mm, and the female specimen measured 98.7 mm.

== Taxonomy ==
Hadrurus hirsutus was given the protonym Buthus hirsutus by Wood in 1863. Tamerlan Thorell placed it in the genus Hadrurus in 1876.

== Original publication ==
- Wood, 1863: Descriptions of new species of North American Pedipalpi. Proceedings of the Academy of Natural Sciences of Philadelphia, vol. 15, p. 107-112 (original text).
