= Robert W. Mitchell =

American zoologist

- Born: Robert Wetsel Mitchell; April 25, 1933; Wellington, Texas
- Died: March 18, 2010 (aged 76); San Antonio, Texas
- Known for: Robert W. Mitchell
- Scientific career
- Fields: Zoology, speleology, photography
- Workplaces: Texas Tech University
- Author abbrev. (zoology): Mitchell

Robert Wetsel Mitchell (April 25, 1933 – March 18, 2010) was an American invertebrate zoologist and photographer who was particularly active in the study of the biology of caves.

Mitchell was awarded Bachelor of Science (1954) and Master of Science (1955) degrees from Texas Tech University, and Doctor of Philosophy from the University of Texas at Austin in 1961. He was in the United States Air Force Medical Service from 1955 to 1957.

Genera and species Mitchell described include Typhlochactas (1971), Typhlochactas reddelli (1968), Typhlochactas rhodesi (1968) and Sotanochactas elliotti (1971).

Typhlochactas mitchelli or Pseudocellus mitchelli are named in honor of Mitchell.
