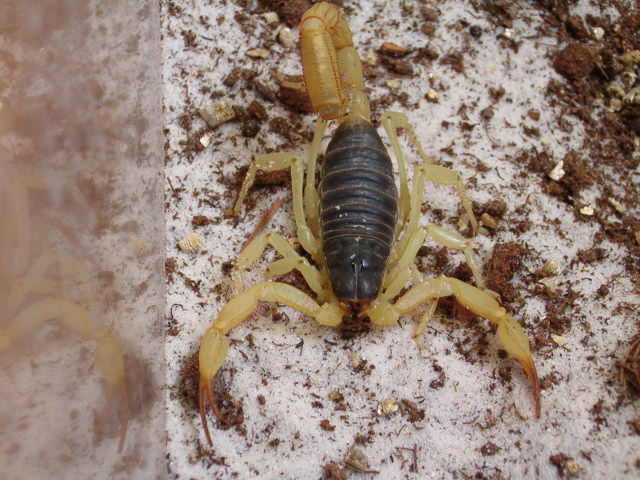

Scientific classification
- Kingdom: Animalia
- Phylum: Arthropoda
- Subphylum: Chelicerata
- Class: Arachnida
- Order: Scorpiones
- Family: Hadruridae
- Genus: Hadrurus
- Species: H. spadix

Binomial name
- Hadrurus spadix (Stahnke, 1940)

= Hadrurus spadix =

Species of scorpion

Hadrurus spadix is a large (around 15 centimetres (5.9 inches)) scorpion native to the southern deserts of North America. It is a burrowing scorpion which spends much of its time digging in the sand and enlarging its burrow. A similar species is the giant desert hairy scorpion.

== Captive care ==
Hadrurus spadix can be housed in a big vivarium. A mixture of peat and sand should be used for substrate, though sand should be the major component. The substrate should be humidified in order to stabilize it and permit burrowing, then dried before introducing the scorpion in the vivarium. A rock or a piece of bark should be provided so the scorpion can dig its burrow under it. No water is needed in the vivarium and humidity should be quite low (30%) to prevent mycosis. Hadrurus spadix requires high temperatures, and do best at 30–35 °C (86–95 °F) during the day, with a sharp drop in temperatures (to 20 °C (68 °F)) during the night to mimic desert conditions. As with all scorpions, this species can be fed most types of small insects, though crickets remain the most common choice.

== Behavior ==
Commonly known as the black-back scorpion, it can be differentiated from the giant desert hairy scorpion by its completely black prosoma or cephalothorax. This scorpion is quite nervous and can display aggressiveness. The toxicity of its venom is usually deemed to be low, though its sting can be quite painful. The scorpion locates its prey through vibrations, meaning it has more difficulty finding prey that are less active. The scorpion will often pause prior to feeding, although no explanation is known for why this behavior occurs.
