= Typhlochactas mitchelli =

Scientific classification
- Kingdom: Animalia
- Phylum: Arthropoda
- Subphylum: Chelicerata
- Class: Arachnida
- Order: Scorpiones
- Family: Typhlochactidae
- Genus: Typhlochactas
- Species: T. mitchelli

Binomial name
- Typhlochactas mitchelli Sissom, 1988

Species of scorpion

Typhlochactas mitchelli is a species of scorpion of the family Typhlochactidae. It is endemic to the state of Oaxaca, Mexico. This species is of the eyeless cave-dwelling genus Typhlochactas.
