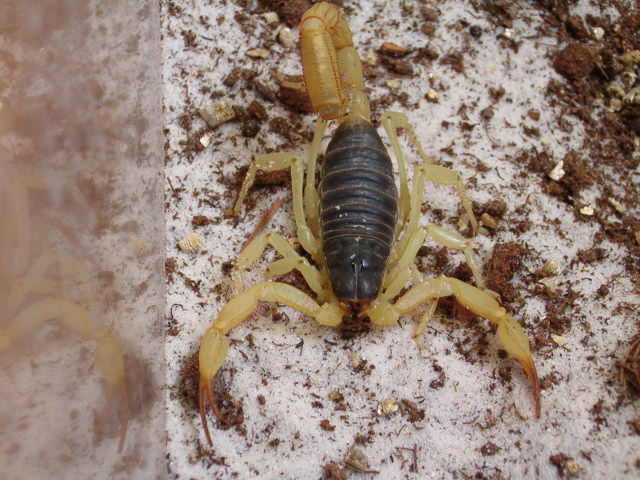
- Hadrurus spadix

Scientific classification
- Kingdom: Animalia
- Phylum: Arthropoda
- Subphylum: Chelicerata
- Class: Arachnida
- Order: Scorpiones
- Family: Hadruridae
- Genus: Hadrurus; Thorell, 1876

= Hadrurus =

Genus of scorpions

Hadrurus is a genus of scorpions which belongs to the family Hadruridae. They are found in sandy deserts and other xeric habitats in northwestern Mexico and in southwest United States. They are among the largest of all scorpion genera, only surpassed by Hadogenes, Pandinus, Heterometrus and Hoffmannihadrurus.

== Taxonomy ==
There are currently 7 species of this genus which are recognized:

- Hadrurus anzaborrego Soleglad, Fet & Lowe, 2011
- Hadrurus arizonensis Ewing, 1928
- Hadrurus concolorous Stahnke, 1969
- Hadrurus hirsutus Wood, 1863
- Hadrurus obscurus Williams, 1970
- Hadrurus pinteri Stahnke, 1969
- Hadrurus spadix Stahnke, 1940

Two species (H. aztecus and H. gertschi) were separated and placed in the genus Hoffmannihadrurus based on the larger distance between the lateral eyes and the anterior margin of the carapace as well as the shorter distance between the median eyes and the lateral eyes.

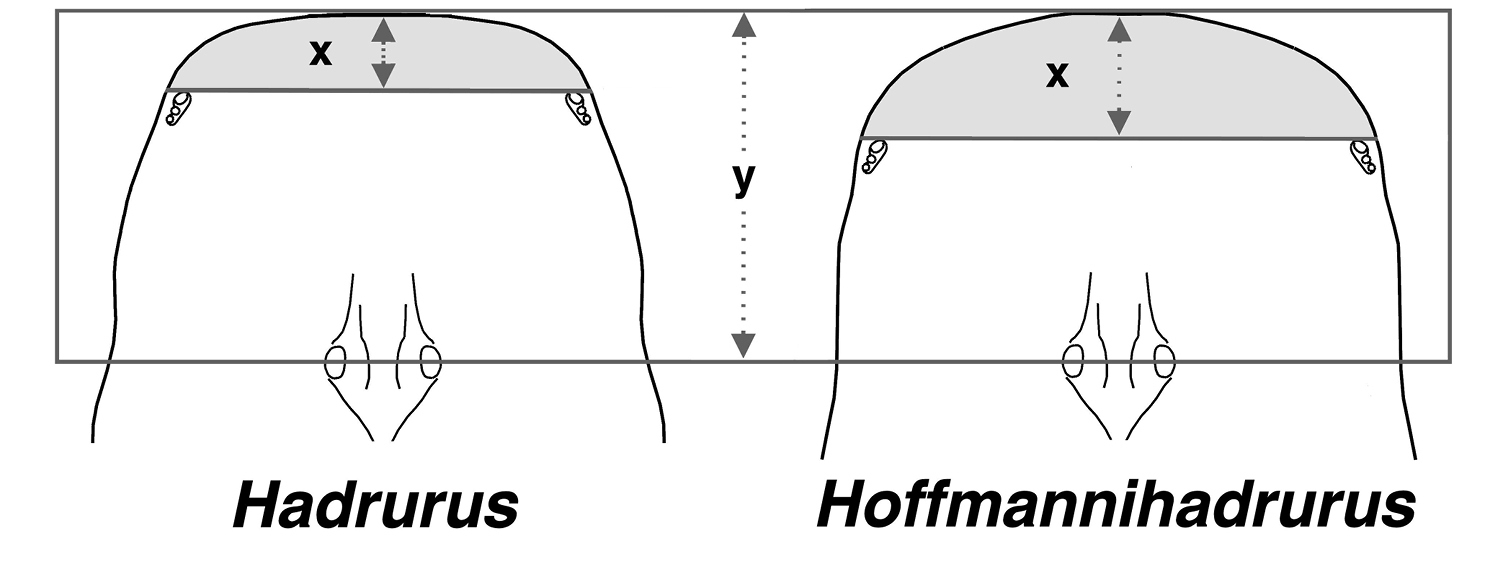
Distances between the lateral and median eyes and the anterior edge of the carapace in the genera Hadrurus and Hoffmannihadrurus.

== General characteristics ==
The species of this genus are large (up to a max of 15 cm) and hairy scorpions with yellowish tones through their bodies although there is an exception in Hadrurus spadix, a species which has a dark almost black prosoma and mesosoma while the palps, legs and metasoma are yellow in color. Not the palps nor the metasoma are in any way reduced in size.

=== Toxicity ===
Though not considered to have a dangerously toxic venom, its sting is still quite painful; unlike other big species of scorpions which defend themselves using their powerful palps to pinch the attacker, the species of Hadrurus prefer to sting.

== Behaviour ==
The species of this genus are quite active through the night foraging for food or a potential mate. They are avid burrowers, preferring somewhat (but not completely) loose soil such as dried sand to make their burrows. If loose soil is not available, they can take shelter beneath rocks and dead plants such as Opuntia and Cylindropuntia during the day. It bears live young which are guarded by the female until they undergo their first molt.
