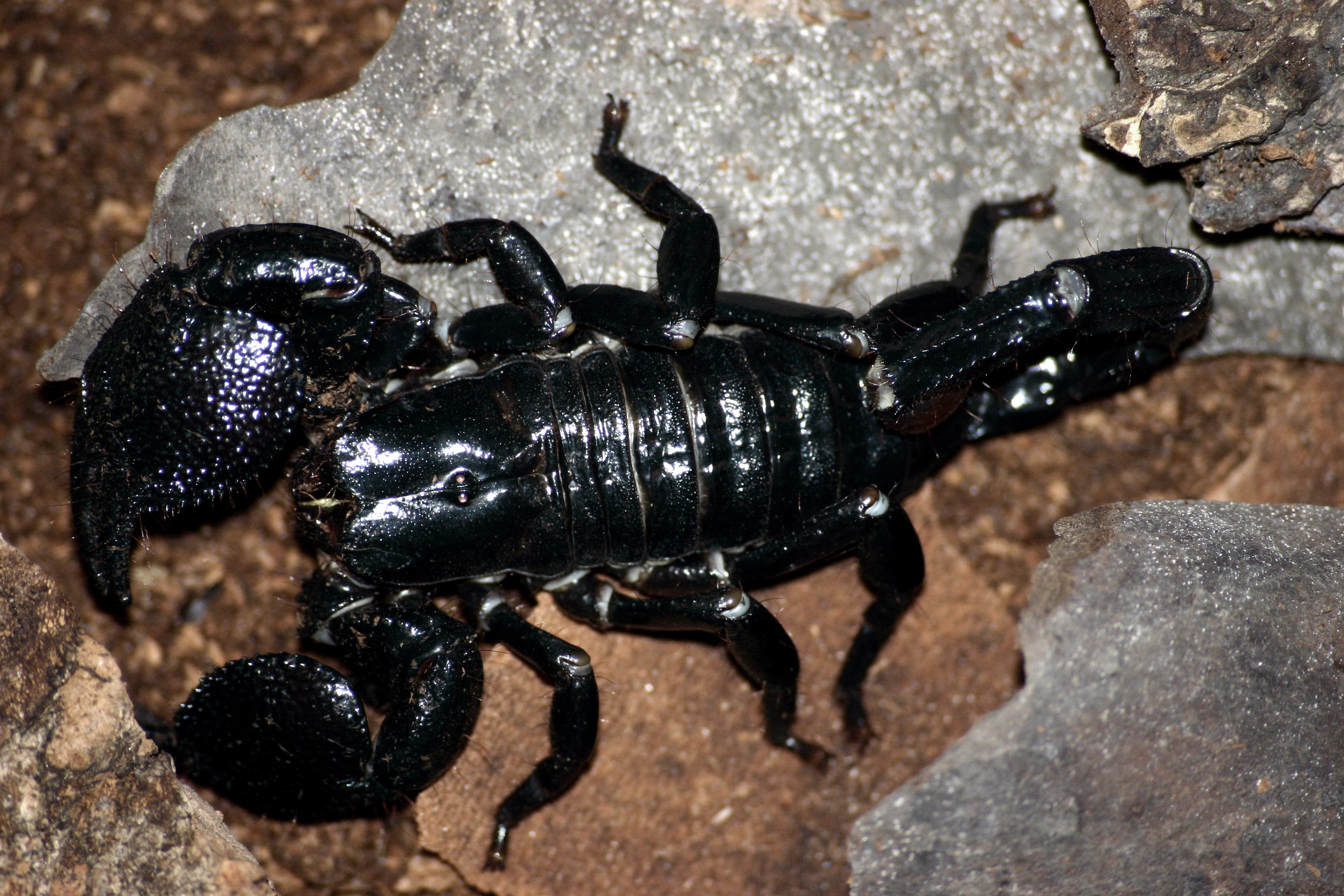
- Pandinus imperator

Scientific classification
- Kingdom: Animalia
- Phylum: Arthropoda
- Subphylum: Chelicerata
- Class: Arachnida
- Order: Scorpiones
- Family: Scorpionidae
- Subfamily: Scorpioninae
- Genus: Pandinus; Thorell, 1876

Type species
- Buthus imperator C. L. Koch, 1841

Diversity
- 4 species

= Pandinus =

Genus of scorpions

Pandinus is a genus of large scorpions belonging to the family Scorpionidae. It contains one of the most popular pet scorpions, the emperor scorpion (P. imperator). The genus is distributed across tropical Africa.

== Taxonomy ==
The genus was introduced in 1876 by Tamerlan Thorell. Subsequent research subdivided the genus into five subgenera. In 2015 all five subgenera were raised to genus level.

=== Diversity ===
Currently, 4 species are recognized within this genus:

- Pandinus gambiensis Pocock, 1899
- Pandinus imperator (C. L. Koch, 1841)
- Pandinus ugandaensis Kovarik, 2011
- Pandinus ulderigoi Rossi, 2014

== General characteristics ==
Members of Pandinus are generally large scorpions (about 120–200 mm total length), which are dark to black colored, sometimes with paler metasoma and legs. The pedipalp pincers are massive, while the metasoma is proportionally thin with a small vesicle and stinger (aculeus). They possess a stridulatory organ, composed of a rough area on the first segment (coxa) of the pedipalps and a 'scraper' made of bristles on the first segment of their first pair of walking legs. Scraping these bristles on the rough zone produces a scratching sound. Genera of the subfamily Scorpioninae are extremely similar to each other and Pandinus is especially close to the Southeast Asian genus Heterometrus. They differ mainly in details of the stridulatory organ and sensory bristles (trichobothria).

=== Toxicity ===
As in other Scorpionidae, the venom of Pandinus species is rather mild, and human fatalities are unknown. Symptoms are mostly restricted to local pain, described similar to those of a bee sting. At least P. imperator rarely stings at all, and often prefers to use its massive pincers for prey capture and even for defense. The defensive behavior of the other species is not yet studied in detail.

== Habitat ==
Most species live in humid tropical low-land regions. They occur in rain forest, gallery forest near rivers and other woodlands aside of savannah habitats. Arabian species also occur in semiarid climates. Soft, loamy soils seem to be preferred by most species, but ecology is only well known for the forest-living P. imperator.

== Conservational status ==
Two species of Pandinus (P. imperator, and P. gambiensis) are the only scorpions listed by the CITES Appendix II since 1995, due to overexploitation for pet trade from the wild. CITES export quotas have been issued for P. imperator by several countries in West Africa (including Benin, Togo, Niger, and Chad). The CITES listing has been conceptually criticized for protecting two species, of which only one (P. imperator) is frequently exported for international pet trade. Even in countries with effective quotas, the origin of traded specimens either from farms or from the wild is hardly traceable. Beside of overharvesting, the species are most endangered by habitat destruction due to deforestation. Traded specimens are sometimes labelled "Pandinus africanus". This name is an invalid synonym for P. imperator and apparently used to avoid CITES regulations for this species. However, other - unlisted - species were also traded under this name.

== In captivity ==
The large size, its docile and gregarious behaviour, partly diurnal activity and mild venom make P. imperator the most popular pet scorpion. After listing of the species in CITES, commercial scorpion farms have been established in several West African countries.
