= LmKTT-1a =

Scorpion Toxin

LmKTT-1a (SdPI-2, δ-KTx2.1) is a bifunctional Kunitz-type toxin belonging to the ẟ-KTx subfamily, which can be found in the venom of Lychas mucronatus (the Chinese swimming scorpion). As a bifunctional toxin, it both inhibits trypsin activity and blocks Kv1 channels with a weak selectivity towards Kv1.3 channels.

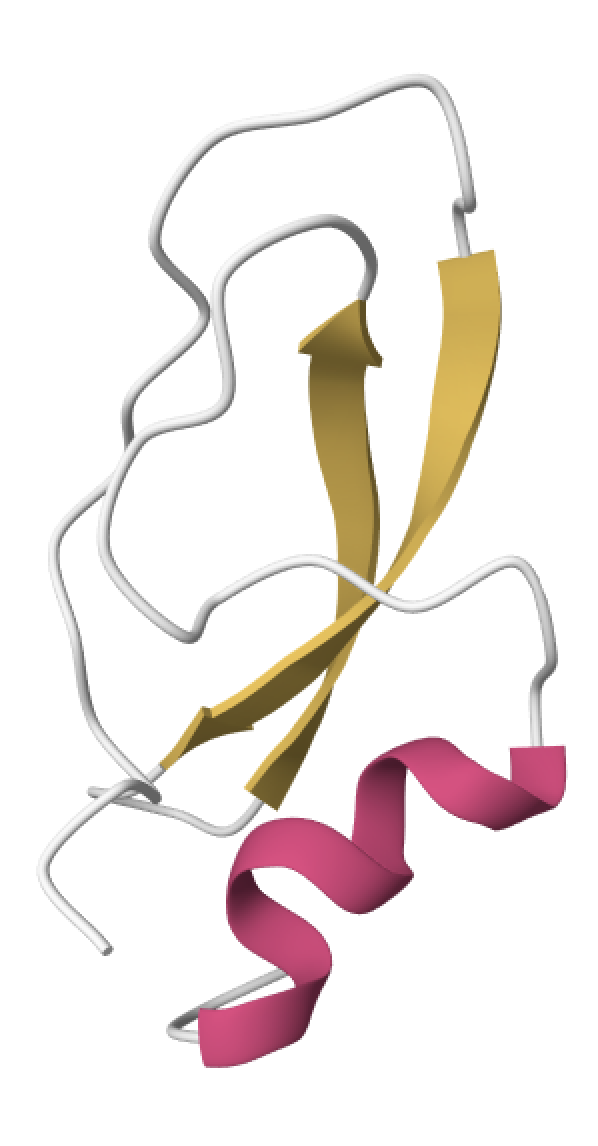
Figure 1. Secondary structure of mature LmKTT-1a protein. Short α-helix (pink) is connected to two antiparallel β-sheets (yellow), representing the Kunitz-type fold. Image adapted from RCSB PDB.

== Source and etymology ==
The LmKTT-1a toxin was first identified in Lychas mucronatus, a scorpion belonging to the Buthidae family, which is widely spread around Southeast Asia and southern China.

The LmKTT-1a nomenclature describes the toxin species of origin (Lm: L.mucronatus) and its structural scaffold (KTT: Kunitz-type toxin).

LmKTT-1a was first identified and named as a scorpion-derived protease inhibitor (SdPI-2). The mature protein of this toxin has 96.6% sequence homology with a toxin named LmKTT-1b (SdPI). The mature protein is established by removing the signal sequence prior to it (see Amino Acid Sequence table). The mature proteins of the two toxins differ only in their second and twenty sixth amino acids: SdPI possesses an asparagine (Asn) and a glycine (Gly), whereas SdPI-2 has a lysine (Lys) and a serine (Ser) in these locations, respectively.

== Chemistry ==
=== Structure ===
The mature protein of LmKTT-1a (SdPI-2) is composed of 59 amino acids with a molecular mass of 8658.6 Da. These residues assemble into a unique Kunitz-type structural fold, which is typical for the δ-KTx subfamily. This characteristic fold consists of a short α-helix connected to two antiparallel β-sheets with six cysteines in the sequence to form three disulfide bridges (see figure 1). This ẟ-KTx subfamily's typical Kunitz-type fold represents a third possible structure of scorpion toxins specific to potassium (K^{+}) channels (KTx).

Amino Acid Sequence of LmKTT-1a (SdPI-2)

MKSFLLIALVLFFLFVSYASAKKKCQLPSDVGKGKASFTRYYYNEESGKCETFIYGGVGGNSNNFLTKEDCCRECAQGSC Signal Sequence Mature Protein (1-59)

=== Cysteine framework ===
LmKTT-1a adopts a distinctive cysteine framework. While Kunitz-type toxins normally have a CysII-CysIV disulfide bridge, LmKTT-1a lacks this bridge and instead possesses two cysteine residues near the C-terminus (Cys51 and Cys59), which form a new disulfide bridge. This disulfide bridge has little to no effect on the toxin's fold and ability to block potassium channels. Yet, after eliminating this Cys51-C59 disulfide bridge, trypsin was inhibited with five-fold lower K_{i} than wildtype LMKTT-1a.

== Targets ==
LmKTT-1a targets voltage-gated potassium channels and blocks them. The toxin has a weak selectivity for Kv1.3 channels with an IC_{50}-value of 1.58±0.73 μM, with less effect on Kv1.1 and Kv1.2 channels.

Moreover, LmKTT-1a also selectively inhibits trypsin with a K_{i} value of 0.14-0.16 μM at a 1:1 stoichiometric ratio, while not affecting chymotrypsin and elastase activity.

== Mode of Action ==
The related toxin LmKTT-1b (SdPI) inhibits trypsin activity through forming a complex with trypsin, where LmKTT-1b's active site (K12 to A15) interacts with the S1 pocket of trypsin. In this pocket, K14 forms hydrogen bonds with two residues of trypsin (D176 and S192). This K14 is crucial for LmKTT-1b's inhibitory activity, as this activity is fully abolished when K14 is mutated to a hydrophobic residue.
