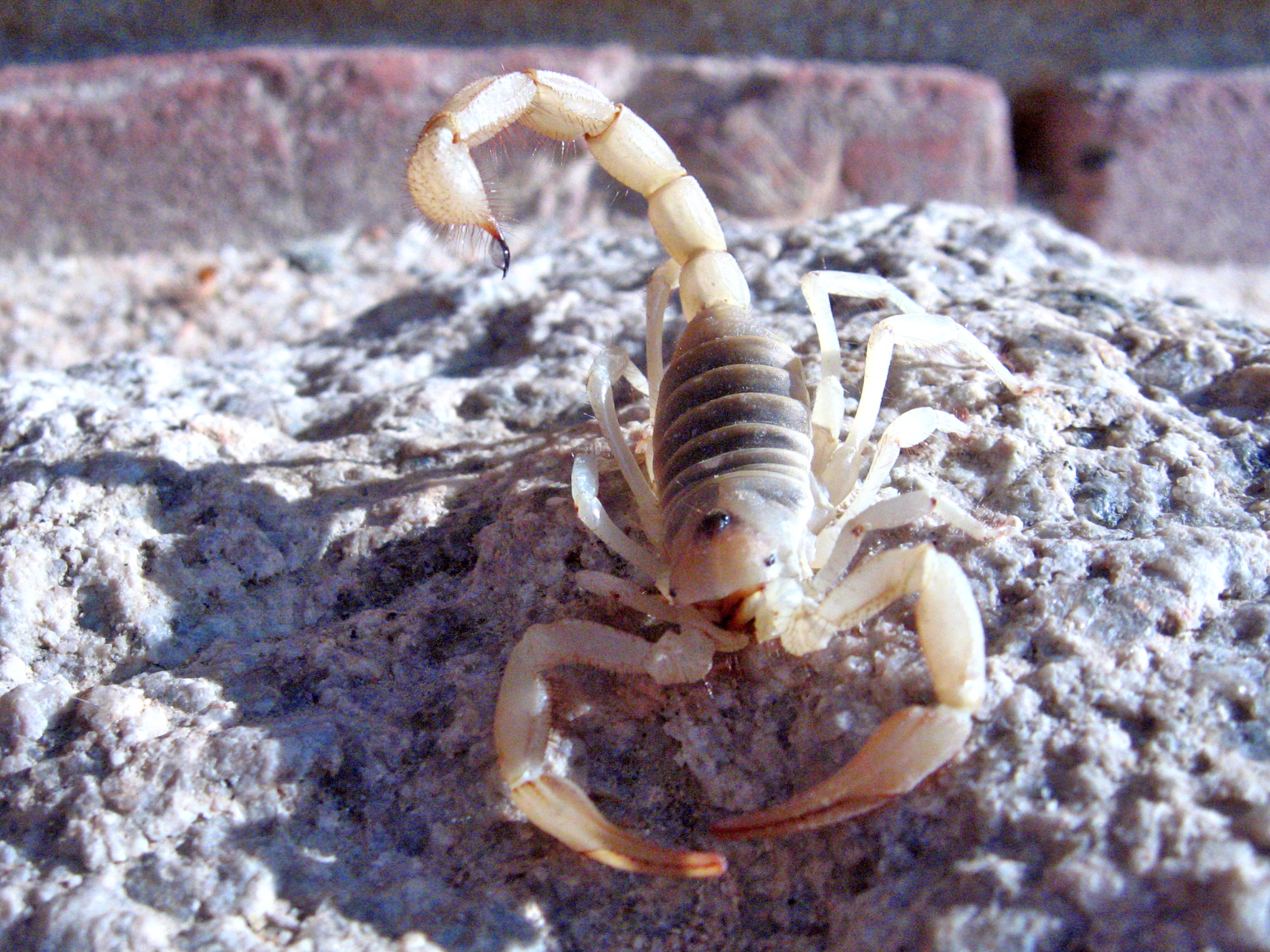
- In Joshua Tree National Park, California

Scientific classification
- Kingdom: Animalia
- Phylum: Arthropoda
- Subphylum: Chelicerata
- Class: Arachnida
- Order: Scorpiones
- Family: Hadruridae
- Genus: Hadrurus
- Species: H. arizonensis

Binomial name
- Hadrurus arizonensis Ewing, 1928

= Hadrurus arizonensis =

Species of scorpion

Hadrurus arizonensis, the giant desert hairy scorpion, giant hairy scorpion, or Arizona Desert hairy scorpion is a large scorpion found in North America.

== Description ==
H. arizonensis is the largest scorpion in North America, and one of the 8–9 species of Hadrurus in the United States, attaining a length of 14 cm (5.5 in). They measure 10 to 18 cm in length (average 15 cm) and weigh 4 to 7 g (average 5 g). Males and females are very similar in appearance, and they are usually tan to olive-green in color, with a darker back and yellow pedipalps, legs, and tail. This species is usually yellow with a dark top and has crab-like pincers. It gets its common names from the brown hairs that cover its body. These hairs help it to detect vibration in the soil. Females of the species tend to have wider, stockier bodies, while males tend to have larger pincers. A similar species is Hadrurus spadix.

== Habitat ==
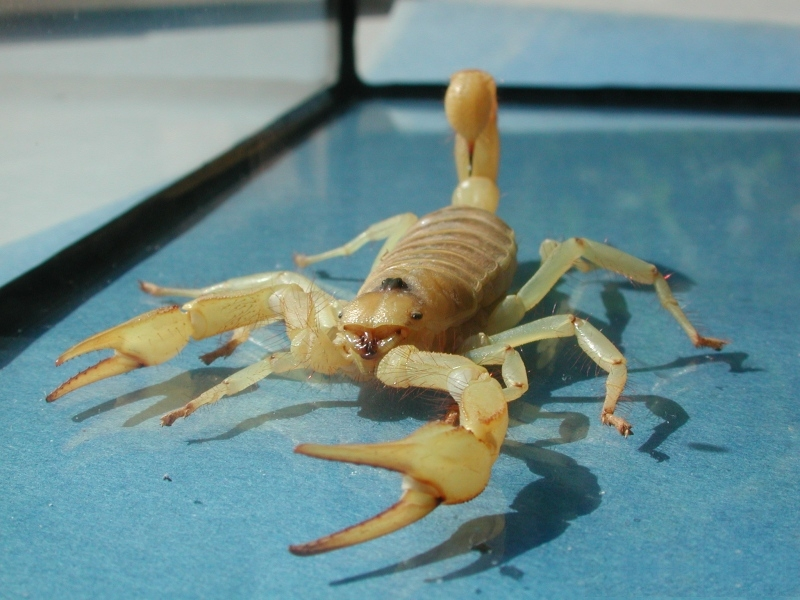
Hadrurus pallidus

Hadrurus arizonensis is distributed throughout the Sonoran and Mojave deserts. In Mexico, the species' range flanks the Gulf of California in Sonora and Baja California. In the United States, it is found in the western two thirds of Arizona, the Colorado Desert and Mojave Desert regions of southern California, southern Nevada, and extreme southwestern Utah. They commonly occupy abandoned burrows, small caves, and crevices. They also seek out ornamental plants and irrigated lawns that attract beetles and other invertebrate prey, generally residing around 900 to 1800 m in elevation. Arizona Desert hairy scorpions are a warm-desert species, specially adapted to hot and dry conditions. They are usually found in and around washes or low-elevation valleys where they dig elaborate burrows (up to 2.5 m or 8 ft 2 in) and emerge at night to forage for prey and mates. Other species commonly encountered living sympatrically with this species are: Smeringurus mesaensis, Hoffmannius confusus, and Hoffmannius spinigerus .

== Diet and behavior ==
=== Diet ===
It is a carnivorous arachnid that primarily feeds on large insects, spiders, but it is also known to consume small vertebrates, such as lizards and rodents, and occasionally other scorpions. Its large size enables it to capture relatively large prey items compared to most scorpion species. Field observations suggest that small snakes, particularly those in the family Leptotyphlopidae, may comprise up to 10% of its diet, indicating that predation on small reptiles occurs with some frequency.

=== Behavior ===
It is a burrowing scorpion, but is commonly found under rocks containing moisture. Its diet consists of large insects, spiders, and small vertebrates. Its competitors include the giant desert centipede which is also a natural predator to the scorpion. This scorpion is active and aggressive, if provoked. As with all scorpions, it is nocturnal and viviparous. The giant desert hairy scorpion's live young remain on the mother's back for a week or more before leaving.

== Predators and prey ==
Within the desert ecosystem, the Hadrurus arizonensis acts as both predator and prey, feeding on insects and small animals, and being also hunted by some mammals, birds, and some reptiles. In a 2019 study, it showed that the scorpion can detect chemical cues from predators (Nisani & Curiel). When exposed to the scent of a Norway rat (Rattus norvegicus), a known predator, it shows a more defensive reaction by the animal with them stinging more often and releasing venom, showing the use of smell to sense danger and adjust its behavior.

When interacting with its prey, the scorpion often evokes the “sit and wait’ method of hunting, by staying still in its stance and relying on its legs and sensory organs to detect vibrations from nearby prey. When it feels movement, it then grabs the prey with its pincers and injects its venom using its stinger, in order to immobilize its prey.

== Toxicity ==
Although this scorpion is big, its venom is not very potent, and its sting is commonly perceived to be about as painful as a honeybee's sting. The venom has an LD_{50} value of 168 mg/kg. However, an allergic reaction to its venom is uncommon; symptoms can include difficulty breathing, excessive swelling, and prolonged pain. Their venom is not potent enough to be fatal. Earlier behavioral work (e.g., Tallarovic 2000) indicates that H. arizonensis displays distinct courtship and aggressive behaviors, consistent with other large scorpions.

== Antimicrobial properties of hemolymph ==
In 2021, a study characterized the antibacterial activity of H. arizonensis hemolymph (the non-venom circulatory fluid). The hemolymph showed rapid, concentration, and time-dependent inhibition within bacteria (e.g. Escherichia coli), killing within 1–2 minutes in favorable temperature conditions (~25 °C). The study also observed that the hemolymph exhibited no phenoloxidase activity, no hemolysis against sheep red blood cells, and no melanization (a common arthropod immune response). This was the first study documenting immune function in scorpion hemolymph.
