= Typhlochactidae =

Scientific classification
- Domain: Eukaryota
- Kingdom: Animalia
- Phylum: Arthropoda
- Subphylum: Chelicerata
- Class: Arachnida
- Order: Scorpiones
- Superfamily: Chactoidea
- Family: Typhlochactidae

Subfamilies
- Alacraninae; Typhlochactinae

Family of scorpions

Typhlochactidae is a family of troglomorphic scorpions native to eastern Mexico.

== Overview of genera ==
Subfamily: Alacraninae

- Genus Alacran

Subfamily: Typhlochactinae

- Genus Sotanochactas
- Genus Stygochactas
- Genus Typhlochactas
