= Caraboctonidae =

Scientific classification
- Kingdom: Animalia
- Phylum: Arthropoda
- Subphylum: Chelicerata
- Class: Arachnida
- Order: Scorpiones
- Superfamily: Iuroidea
- Family: Caraboctonidae; Kraepelin, 1905

Family of scorpions

The Caraboctonidae (hairy scorpions) are part of the superfamily Iuroidea. The family was established by Karl Kraepelin in 1905.

== Genera ==
Genera accepted by the Global Biodiversity Information Facility as of February 2024:

- Caraboctonus Pocock, 1893
- Hadruroides Pocock, 1893
