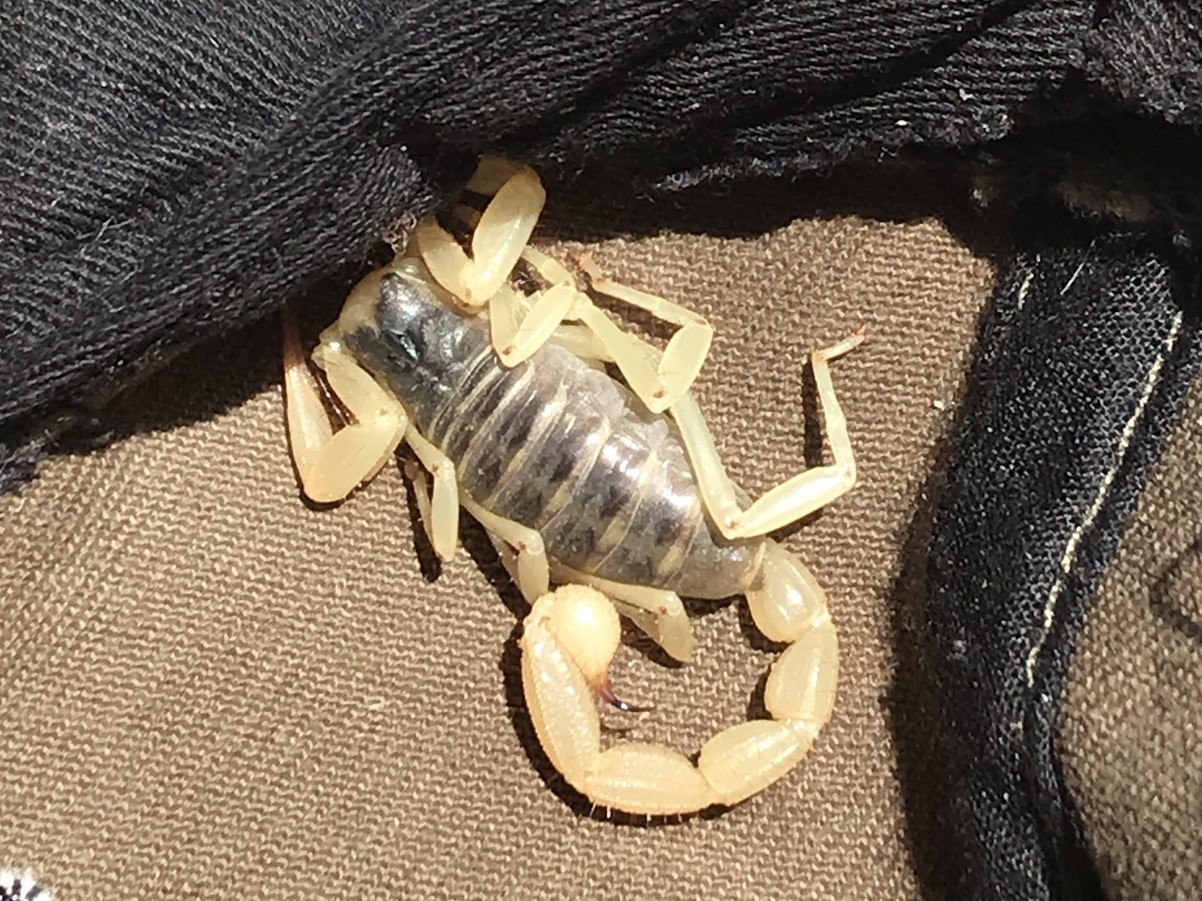
- Hadrurus obscurus

Scientific classification
- Domain: Eukaryota
- Kingdom: Animalia
- Phylum: Arthropoda
- Subphylum: Chelicerata
- Class: Arachnida
- Order: Scorpiones
- Superfamily: Iuroidea
- Family: Hadruridae; Stahnke, 1974

= Hadruridae =

Family of scorpions

Hadruridae is a family of scorpions.

Genera:

- Hadrurus Thorell, 1876
- Hoffmannihadrurus Fet & Soleglad, 2004
