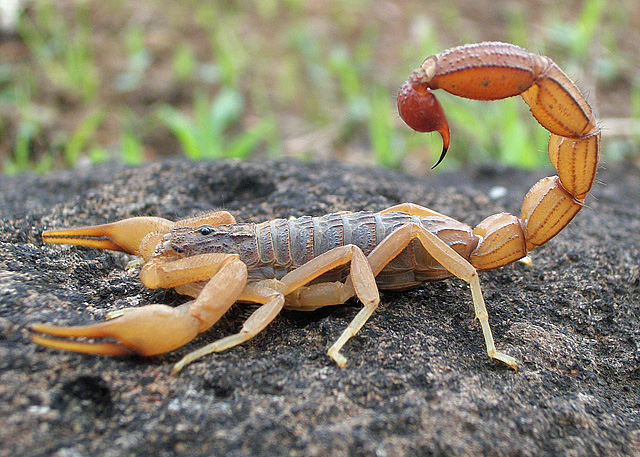
- Hottentotta tamulus from Mangaon, Maharashtra, India

Scientific classification
- Kingdom: Animalia
- Phylum: Arthropoda
- Subphylum: Chelicerata
- Class: Arachnida
- Clade: Arachnopulmonata
- Order: Scorpiones; C. L. Koch, 1837

Families
- see Taxonomy
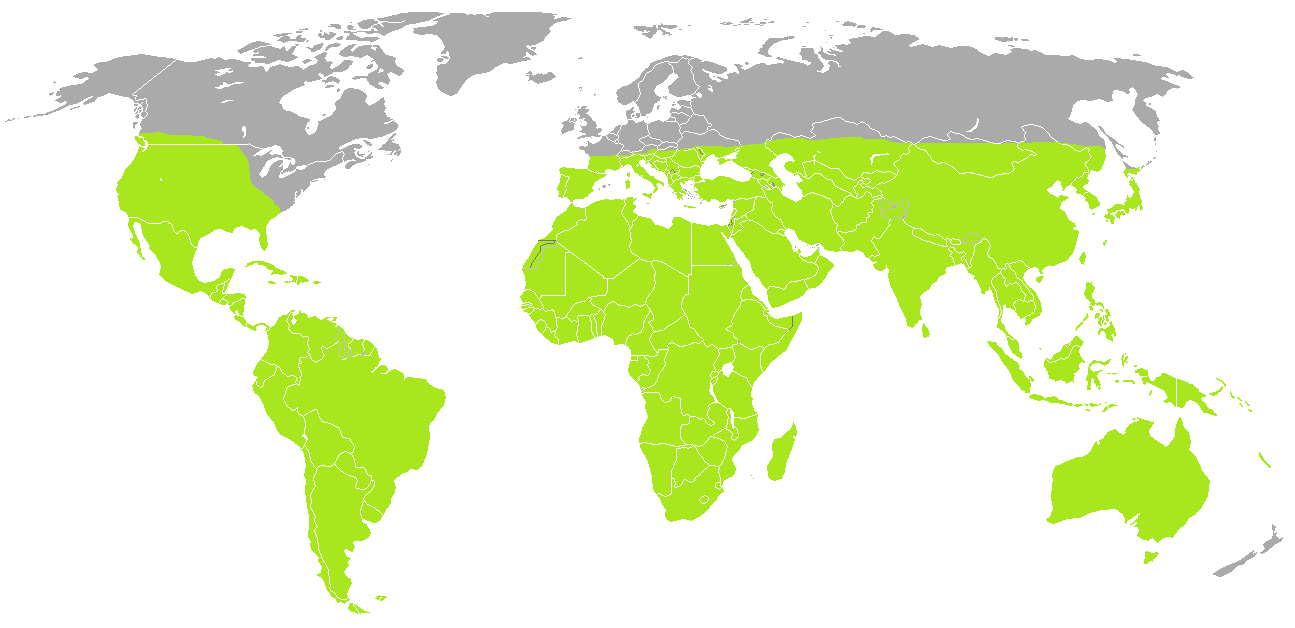
- Native range of Scorpiones

= Scorpion =

Scorpions Temporal range: 435–0 Ma Early Silurian – present

Predatory order of arachnids

Scorpions (order Scorpiones) are predatory arachnids with eight legs, a pair of grasping pincers and a narrow, segmented tail, often carried in a characteristic forward curve over the back and always ending with a stinger. The evolutionary history of scorpions goes back to the Silurian Period, approximately 430 million years ago. They mainly live in deserts but have adapted to a wide range of environmental conditions, and can be found on all continents except Antarctica. There are over 2,500 described species, with 22 extant (living) families recognized to date. Their taxonomy is being revised to account for 21st-century genomic studies.

Scorpions primarily prey on insects and other invertebrates, but some species hunt vertebrates. They use their pincers to restrain and kill prey, or to prevent their own predation. The scorpion's sting is venomous and used for offense and defense. During courtship, the male and female grasp each other's pincers and dance while the male tries to move the female onto his sperm packet. All known species give live birth and the female cares for the young as their exoskeletons harden, transporting them on her back. The exoskeleton contains fluorescent chemicals and glows under ultraviolet light.

The vast majority of species do not seriously threaten humans, and healthy adults usually do not need medical treatment after a sting. About 25 species (fewer than one percent) have venom capable of killing a human, which happens frequently in the parts of the world where they live, primarily where access to medical treatment is unlikely.

Scorpions appear in art, folklore, mythology, and commercial brands. Scorpion motifs are woven into kilim carpets for protection from their sting. Scorpius is the name of a constellation; the corresponding astrological sign is Scorpio. A classical myth about Scorpius tells how the giant scorpion and its enemy Orion became constellations on opposite sides of the sky.

== Etymology ==
The word scorpion originated in Middle English between 1175 and 1225 AD from Old French scorpion, or from Italian scorpione, both derived from the Latin scorpio, equivalent to scorpius, which is the romanization of the Greek σκορπίος skorpíos. The Greek word is not traceable further within Indo-European, but is a loanword, borrowed from a non-Indo-European language; it is "akin to Hebrew ʿaqrāb" (עַקרָב).

== Evolution ==
=== Fossil record ===
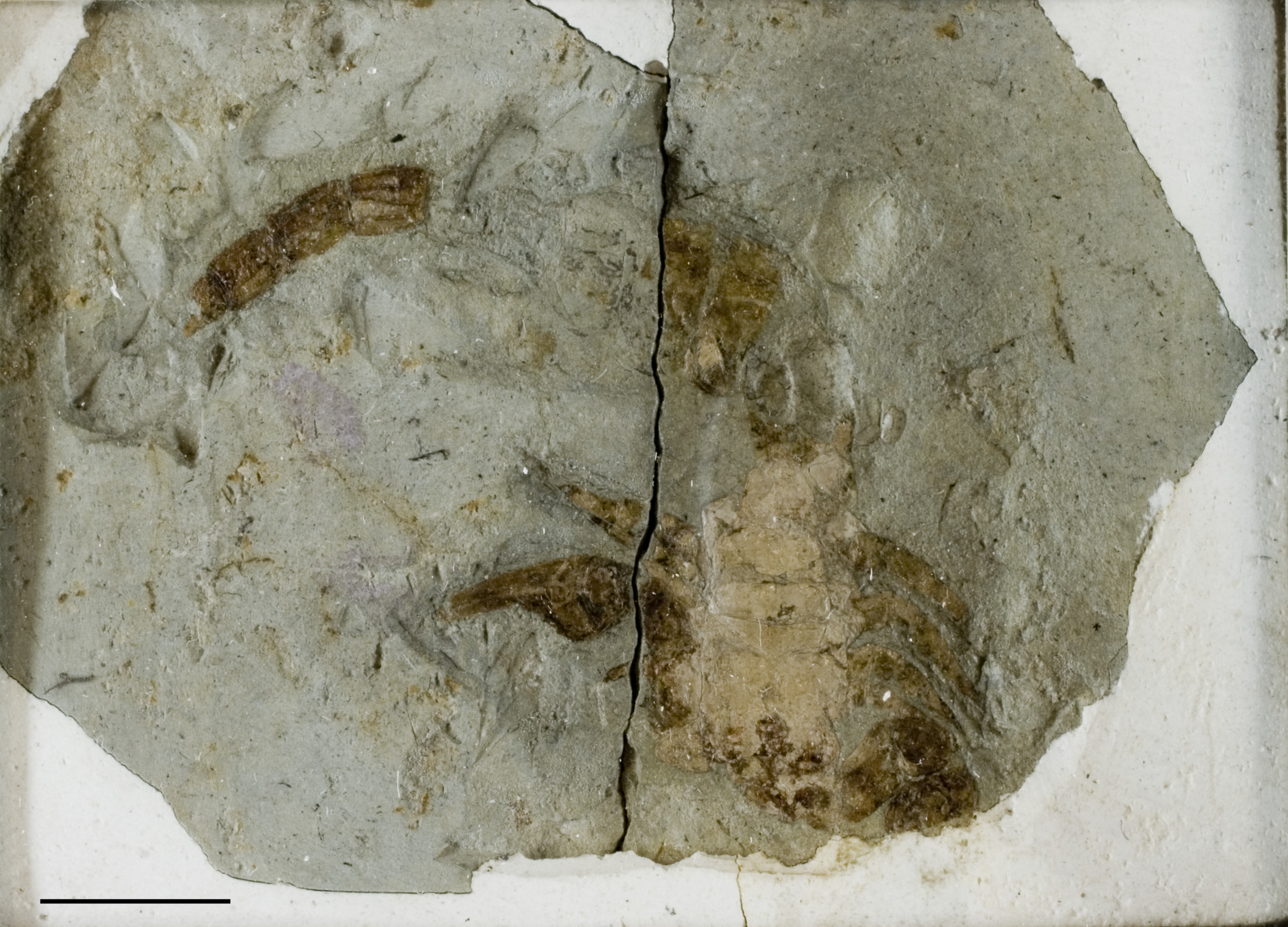
Fossil of Palaeophonus nuncius, a Silurian scorpion from Sweden

Scorpion fossils have been found in many strata, including marine Silurian and estuarine Devonian deposits, coal deposits from the Carboniferous Period and in amber. Whether the early scorpions were marine or terrestrial has been debated, and while they had book lungs like modern terrestrial species, the most basal such as Eramoscorpius were originally considered as still aquatic, until it was found that Eramoscorpius had book lungs. Over 100 fossil species of scorpion have been described. The oldest found as of 2021 is Dolichophonus loudonensis, which lived during the Silurian, in present-day Scotland. Gondwanascorpio from the Devonian is among the earliest-known terrestrial animals on the Gondwana supercontinent. Some Palaeozoic scorpions possessed compound eyes similar to those of eurypterids. The Triassic fossils Protochactas and Protobuthus belong to the modern clades Chactoidea and Buthoidea respectively, indicating that the crown group of modern scorpions had emerged by this time. In 2025, a 140 million year old scorpion was discovered in Jordanian amber by Abbas Haddadin.

=== Phylogeny ===
==== External ====
The Scorpiones are a clade within the pulmonate Arachnida (those with book lungs). Arachnida is placed within the Chelicerata, a subphylum of Arthropoda that contains sea spiders and horseshoe crabs, alongside terrestrial animals without book lungs such as ticks and harvestmen. The extinct Eurypterida, sometimes called sea scorpions, though they were not all marine, are not scorpions; their grasping pincers were chelicerae, unlike those of scorpion which are second appendages. Scorpiones is sister to the Tetrapulmonata, a terrestrial group of pulmonates containing the spiders and whip scorpions.

Pseudoscorpions are the sister group of scorpions in the clade Panscorpiones, which together with Tetrapulmonata make up the clade Arachnopulmonata.

Cladogram of chelicerate relationships, after Sharma and Gavish-Regev (2025):

- Chelicerata
  - Pycnogonida (sea spiders)
  - Prosomapoda
    - Opiliones (harvestmen)
    - - Palpigradi (microwhip scorpions)
      - - Solifugae (camel spiders)
        - Acariformes (mites, in part)
    - Parasitiformes (mites, in part and ticks)
    - - Xiphosura (horseshoe crabs)
      - Ricinulei
      - Arachnopulmonata
        - Panscorpiones
          - Pseudoscorpiones (pseudoscorpions)
          - Scorpiones (scorpions)
        - Tetrapulmonata
          - Araneae (spiders)
          - - Amblypygi (whip-spiders)
            - - Schizomida (shorttailed whipscorpions)
              - Uropygi (whip scorpions/vinegaroons)

==== Internal ====
The internal phylogeny of the scorpions has been debated, but genomic analysis consistently places the Bothriuridae as sister to a clade consisting of Scorpionoidea and Chactoidea. The scorpions diversified during the Devonian and into the early Carboniferous. The main division is into the clades Buthida and Iurida. The Bothriuridae diverged starting before temperate Gondwana broke up into separate land masses, completed by the Jurassic. In 2022, the Caraboctonidae and Hadruridae were treated as superfamilies, separate clades from Iuroidea, while the Vaejovidae were similarly treated as a separate clade from Chactoidea.

- Scorpiones
  - Buthida
    - - Chaeriloidea
      - Pseudochactoidea
    - Buthoidea
  - Iurida
    - Iuroidea (sensu Santibáñez-López 2022)
    - - Bothriuroidea
      - - Caraboctonoidea
        - - Chactoidea (sensu Santibáñez-López 2022)
          - - Hadruroidea
            - - Vaejovoidea
              - Scorpionoidea

=== Taxonomy ===
Carl Linnaeus described six species of scorpion in his genus Scorpio in 1758 and 1767; three of these are now considered valid and are called Scorpio maurus, Androctonus australis, and Euscorpius carpathicus; the other three are dubious names. He placed the scorpions among his "Insecta aptera" (wingless insects). In 1801, Jean-Baptiste Lamarck divided up the "Insecta aptera", creating the taxon Arachnides for spiders, scorpions, and acari (mites and ticks), though it also contained the Thysanura, Myriapoda and parasites such as lice. German arachnologist Carl Ludwig Koch created the order Scorpiones in 1837. He divided it into four families, the six-eyed scorpions "Scorpionides", the eight-eyed scorpions "Buthides", the ten-eyed scorpions "Centrurides", and the twelve-eyed scorpions "Androctonides". More recently, some twenty-two families containing over 2,500 species of scorpions have been described, with many additions and much reorganization of taxa in the 21st century. There are over 100 described taxa of fossil scorpions.

== Geographical distribution ==
Scorpions are found on all continents except Antarctica. They are unusual among animal groups in that they are most diverse at the subtropics rather than the tropics, and are also less common near the poles. New Zealand, and some of the islands in Oceania, have in the past had small populations of introduced scorpions, but they were exterminated. Five colonies of Euscorpius flavicaudis have established themselves since the late 19th century in Sheerness in England at 51°N, while Paruroctonus boreus lives as far north as Red Deer, Alberta. A few species are on the IUCN Red List; Afrolychas braueri is classed as critically endangered (2012), Isometrus deharvengi as endangered (2016) and Chiromachus ochropus as vulnerable (2014).

Scorpions are usually xerocoles, primarily living in deserts, but they can be found in virtually every terrestrial habitat including high-elevation mountains, caves, and intertidal zones. They are largely absent from boreal ecosystems such as the tundra, high-altitude taiga, and mountain tops. The highest altitude reached by a scorpion is 5,500 meters (18,000 ft) in the Andes, for Orobothriurus crassimanus. As regards microhabitats, scorpions may be ground-dwelling, tree-loving, rock-loving or sand-loving. Some species, such as Vaejovis janssi, are versatile and use any habitat on Socorro Island, Baja California, while others such as Euscorpius carpathicus, endemic to the littoral zone of rivers in Romania, occupy specialized niches.

== Morphology ==
Scorpion anatomy (dorsal view of Cheloctonus jonesii): 1 = Cephalothorax or prosoma; 2 = Preabdomen or mesosoma; 3 = Tail or metasoma; 4 = Claws or pedipalps; 5 = Legs; 6 = Mouth parts or chelicerae; 7 = Pincers or chelae; 8 = Moveable claw or tarsus; 9 = Fixed claw or manus; 10 = Stinger or aculeus; 11 = Telson (anus in previous joint); 12 = Opening of book lungs

Scorpions range in size from the 8.5 mm (0.33 in) Typhlochactas mitchelli of Typhlochactidae, to the 23 cm (9.1 in) Heterometrus swammerdami of Scorpionidae. The body of a scorpion is divided into two parts or tagmata: the cephalothorax or prosoma, and the abdomen or opisthosoma. (Note: As there is currently neither paleontological nor embryological evidence that arachnids ever had a separate thorax-like division, there exists an argument against the validity of the term cephalothorax, which means fused cephalon (head) and the thorax. Similarly, arguments can be formed against use of the term abdomen, as the opisthosoma of all scorpions contains a heart and book lungs, organs atypical of an abdomen.) The opisthosoma consists of a broad anterior portion, the mesosoma or pre-abdomen, followed by a thinner tail-like posterior, the metasoma or post-abdomen. External differences between the sexes are not obvious in most species. In some, the tail of the male is slenderer than that of the female.

=== Cephalothorax ===
The cephalothorax comprises the carapace (a helmet-like structure), eyes, chelicerae (mouth parts), pedipalps (which have chelae, commonly called claws or pincers) and four pairs of walking legs. Scorpions have two eyes on the top of the cephalothorax, and usually two to five pairs of eyes along the front corners of the cephalothorax. While unable to form sharp images, their central eyes are amongst the most light sensitive in the animal kingdom, especially in dim light, which makes it possible for nocturnal species to use starlight to navigate at night. The chelicerae are at the front and below the carapace. They are pincer-like and have three segments and "teeth". The supraesophageal ganglion of a scorpion performs a function similar to a brain and is located in the front part of the cephalothorax, just above the esophagus. As in other arachnids, the nervous system is highly concentrated in the cephalothorax, but has a long ventral nerve cord with segmented ganglia (nerve junctions) which may be a primitive trait.

The pedipalp is a segmented, clawed appendage segmented into (from closest to the body outward) the coxa, trochanter, femur, patella, tibia (including the fixed claw and the manus) and tarsus (moveable claw). Unlike those of some other arachnids, the eight-segmented legs have not been altered for other purposes, though they may occasionally be used for digging, and females may use them to catch emerging young. They are covered with many proprioceptors (position sensors), bristles and sensory hair-like setae. Depending on the species, the legs may have spines and spurs.

=== Mesosoma ===
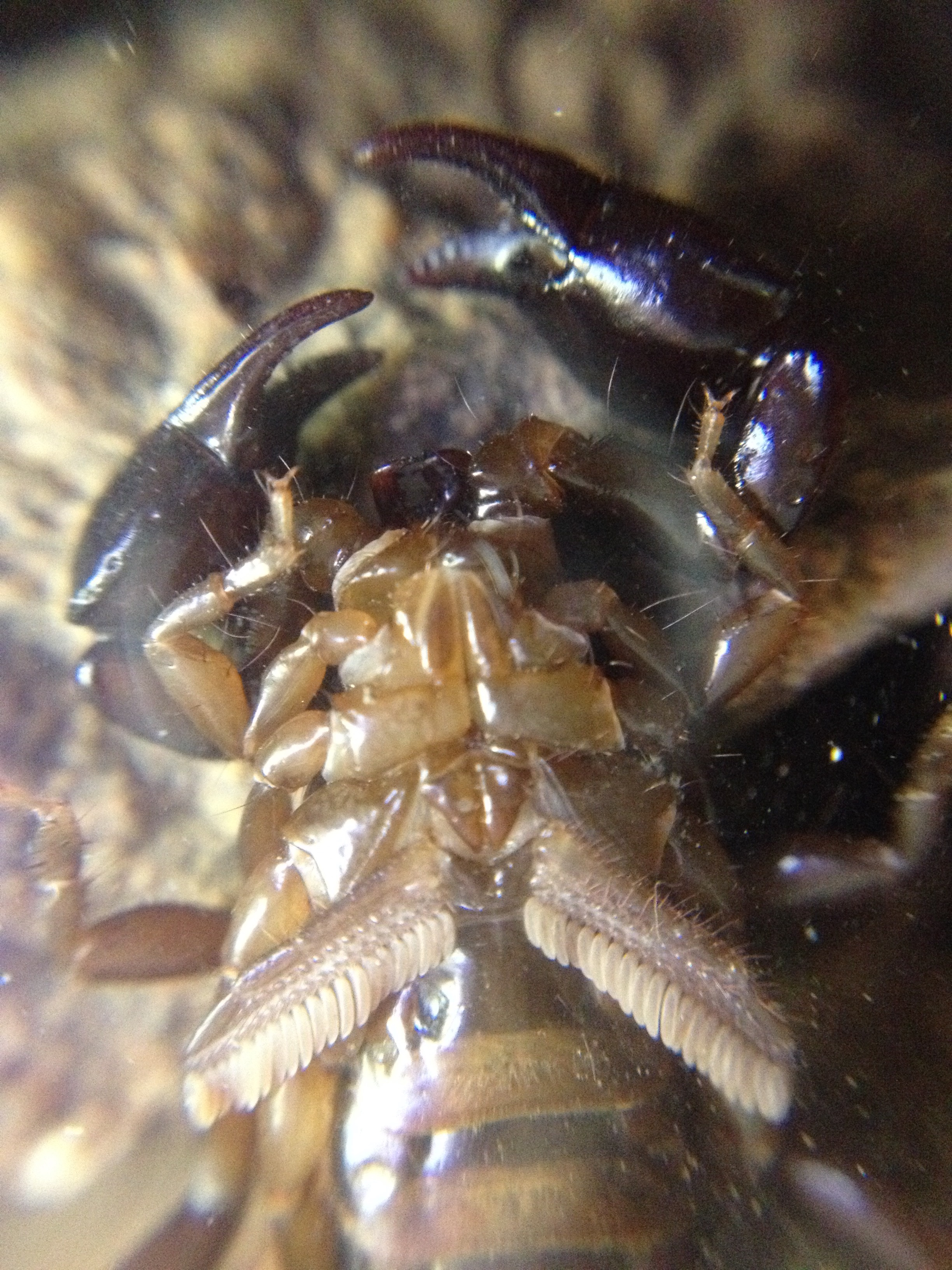
Ventral view: the pectines have a comblike structure in an inverted V shape.

The mesosoma or preabdomen is the broad part of the opisthosoma. In the early stages of embryonic development the mesosoma consist of eight segments, but the first segment disappears before birth, so the mesosoma in scorpions actually consist of segments 2–8. These anterior seven somites (segments) of the opisthosoma are each covered by a hardened plate, the tergite, on the back surface. Underneath, somites 3 to 7 are armored with matching plates called sternites. The underside of somite 1 has two, covering the genital opening. Sternite 2 forms the basal plate bearing the comb-like pectines, which function as sensory organs.

The next four somites, 3 to 6, all possess two breathing holes or spiracles each. They serve as openings for the scorpion's respiratory organs, known as book lungs, and vary in shape. There are thus four pairs of book lungs; each consists of some 140 to 150 thin flaps or lamellae filled with air inside a space called the pulmonary chamber, connected on the ventral side to a pocket called the atrial chamber which opens into a spiracle. Bristles keep the lamellae from touching. A muscle opens the spiracle and widens the atrial chamber; dorsoventral muscles contract to constricts the pulmonary chamber, pushing air out, and relax to allow the chamber to refill. The 7th and last somite lacks any notable structure.

The mesosoma contains the heart or "dorsal vessel" which is the center of the scorpion's open circulatory system. The heart is continuous with a deep arterial system which spreads throughout the body. Sinuses return deoxygenated blood (hemolymph) to the heart; the blood is re-oxygenated by cardiac pores. The mesosoma also houses the reproductive system. The female gonads are three or four tubes which are aligned and have two to four transverse anastomoses connecting them. These tubes create oocytes and house developing embryos. They connect to two oviducts which connect to a single atrium leading to the genital orifice. Male gonads are two pairs of cylindrical tubes with a ladder-like configuration; they contain spermatozoa-producing cysts or sacs. Both tubes end in a spermiduct, one on the opposite sides of the mesosoma. They connect to glandular symmetrical structures called paraxial organs, which end at the genital orifice. These create two halves of the chitin-based sperm packet or spermatophore which merge.

=== Metasoma ===
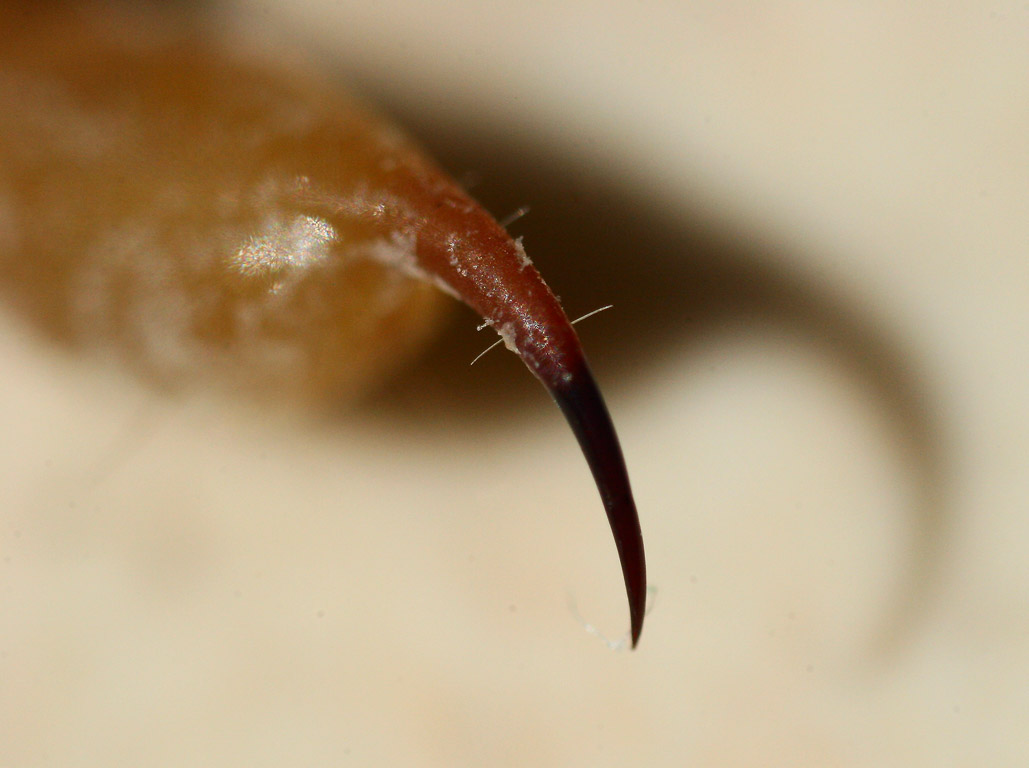
Stinger of an Arizona bark scorpion

The "tail" or metasoma is divided into five segments and the telson, which is not strictly a segment. The five segments are merely body rings; they lack apparent sterna or terga, and are largest farthest from the center. These segments have keels, setae and bristles which may be used for taxonomic classification. The anus is at the back of the last segment, and is encircled by four anal papillae and the anal arch. The tails of some species contain light receptors.

The telson includes the vesicle, which contains a symmetrical pair of venom glands. Externally it bears the curved stinger, the hypodermic aculeus, equipped with sensory hairs. Venom ducts are attached to the glands to transport the substance along the aculeus from the bulb of the gland to immediately near the tip, where each of the paired ducts has its own venom pore. An intrinsic muscle system attached to the glands pumps venom through the stinger into the intended victim. The stinger contains metalloproteins with zinc, hardening the tip. The optimal angle to launch a sting is around 30 degrees relative to the tip.

== Biology ==
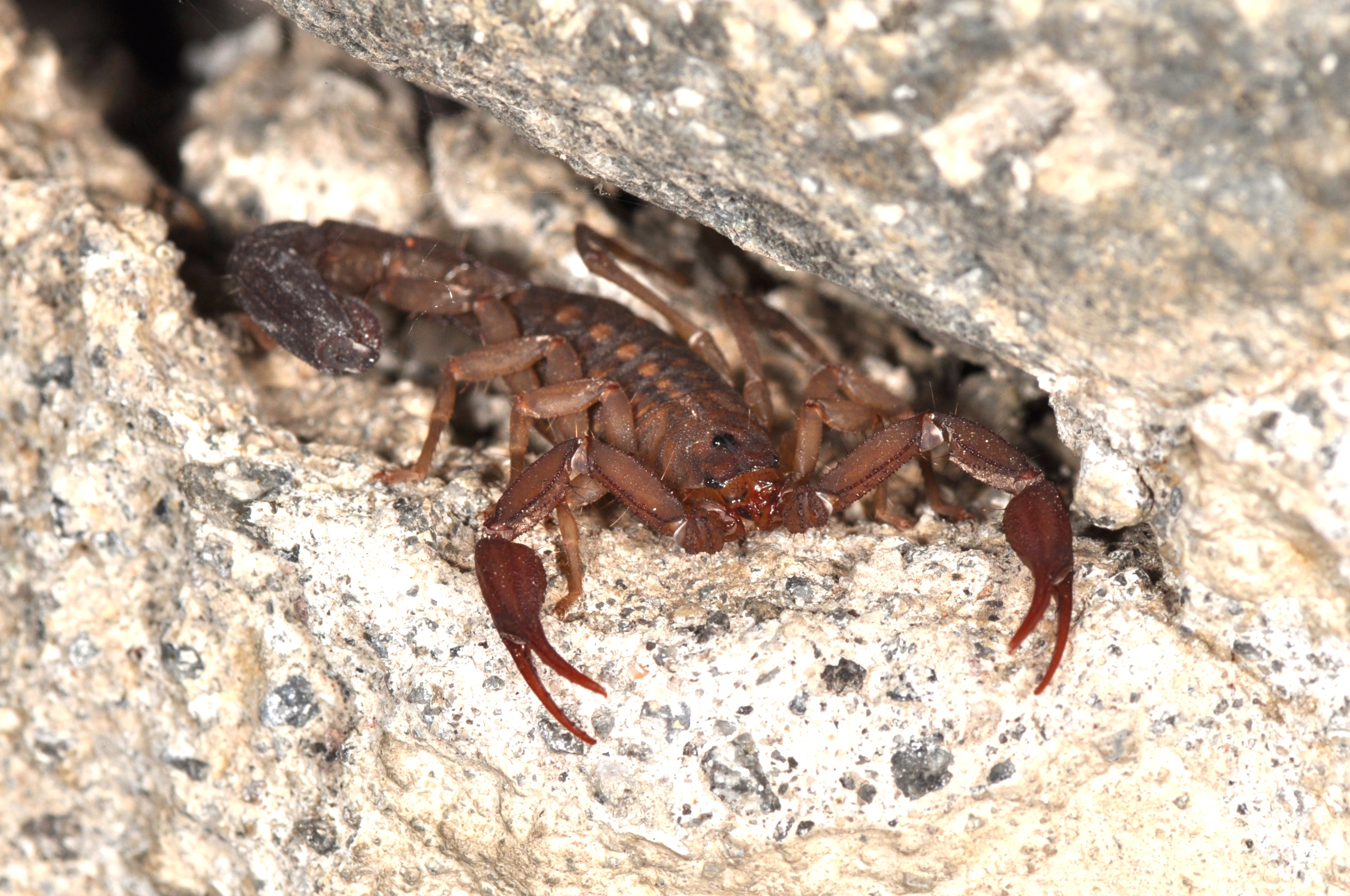
Centruroides limpidus in its rocky shelter

Scorpions are typically nocturnal or crepuscular, finding shelter during the day in burrows, cracks, and bark. Many species dig an elementary shelter underneath tiny stones. Scorpions may use burrows built by other animals or dig their own; scorpion burrows vary in complexity and depth. Hadrurus species dig burrows over 2 m (6 ft 7 in) deep while Urodacus hoplurus digs in spirals. Digging is done using the mouth parts, claws and legs. In several species, particularly of the family Buthidae, individuals can be found in the same shelter; bark scorpions may gather in groups of up to 30 individuals. In some species, families of females and young sometimes aggregate.

Scorpions prefer areas where the temperature remains in the range of 11–40 °C (52–104 °F), but may survive temperatures from well below freezing to desert heat. Scorpions can withstand intense heat: Leiurus quinquestriatus, Scorpio maurus and Hadrurus arizonensis can live in temperatures of 45–50 °C (113–122 °F) if they are sufficiently hydrated. Desert species must deal with the extreme changes in temperature from sunrise to sunset or between seasons; Pectinibuthus birulai lives in a temperature range of −30–50 °C (−22–122 °F). Scorpions that live outside deserts prefer lower temperatures. The ability to withstand the cold may be related to the increase in the sugar trehalose when the temperature drops. Some species hibernate. Scorpions have immunity to ionizing radiation and have survived nuclear tests in Algeria and Nevada.

Desert scorpions have several adaptations for water conservation. They excrete insoluble compounds such as xanthine, guanine, and uric acid, not requiring water for their removal from the body. Guanine is the main component as it holds the greatest amount of nitrogen. A scorpion's cuticle holds in moisture via lipids and waxes from epidermal glands, and protects against ultraviolet radiation. Even a dehydrated scorpion can survive with high osmotic pressure in its blood. Desert scorpions get most of their moisture from the food they eat but some can absorb water from the sand if it is humid enough. Species that live in denser vegetation and in more moderate temperatures will drink from puddles or water accumulated on plants.

A few scorpions squirt venom to deter predators.

A scorpion uses its stinger both for killing prey and defense. Some species make direct, quick strikes with their tails while others make slower, more circular strikes which can more easily return the stinger to a position where it can strike again. Leiurus quinquestriatus can whip its tail at a speed of up to 128 cm/s (50 in/s) in a defensive strike.

=== Mortality and defense ===
Scorpions may be attacked by other arthropods like ants, spiders, solifugids and centipedes. Major predators include frogs, lizards, snakes, birds, and mammals. Predators adapted for hunting scorpions include the grasshopper mouse and desert long-eared bat, which are immune to their venom. In one study, scorpion remains were found in 70% of the latter's droppings. Scorpions host parasites including mites, scuttle flies, nematodes and some bacteria. The immune system of scorpions is strong enough to resist several types of bacterial infections.

When threatened, a scorpion raises its claws and tail in a defensive posture. Some species stridulate to warn off predators by rubbing certain hairs, the stinger or the pectines. Certain species have a preference for using either the claws or stinger as defense, depending on the size of the appendages. A few scorpions, such as Parabuthus, Centruroides margaritatus, and Hadrurus arizonensis, squirt venom as far as 1 meter (3.3 ft) which can injure predators in the eyes. Some Ananteris species can shed parts of their tail to escape predators. The parts do not grow back, leaving them unable to sting and defecate, but they can still kill small prey and reproduce for at least eight months afterward.

=== Diet and feeding ===
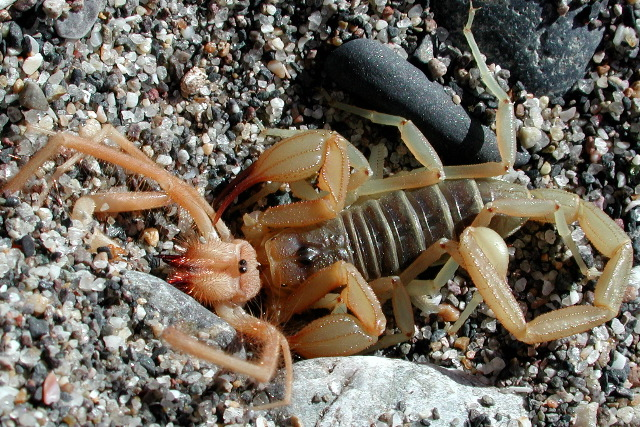
Scorpion feeding on a solifugid

Scorpions generally prey on insects, particularly grasshoppers, crickets, termites, beetles and wasps. They also prey on spiders, solifugids, woodlice and even small vertebrates including lizards, snakes and mammals. Species with large claws may prey on earthworms and mollusks. The majority of species are opportunistic and consume a variety of prey though some may be highly specialized; Isometroides vescus specializes on certain burrowing spiders. Prey size depends on the size of the species. Several scorpion species are sit-and-wait predators, which involves a hungry scorpion staying at or near the entrance to their burrow until prey arrives. Others actively search for prey. Scorpions detect their prey with mechanoreceptive and chemoreceptive hairs on their bodies and grab them with their claws. Small animals are killed merely with the claws, particularly by large-clawed species. Larger and more dangerous prey animals are given a sting.

Scorpions, like other arachnids, digest their food externally. The chelicerae are used to rip small amounts of food off the prey item and into a pre-oral cavity underneath. The digestive juices from the gut are egested onto the food, and the digested food is then sucked into the gut. Any solid indigestible matter (such as exoskeleton fragments) is collected by setae in the pre-oral cavity and ejected. The sucked-in food is pumped into the midgut by the pharynx, where it is further digested. The waste is transported through the hindgut and out of the anus. Scorpions can eat large amounts of food during one meal. They can internally store food in a specialized organ and have a very low metabolic rate which enables some to survive up to a year without eating.

=== Mating ===
Male and female scorpion during promenade à deux

Most scorpions reproduce sexually, with male and female individuals; species in some genera, such as Hottentotta and Tityus, and the species Centruroides gracilis, Liocheles australasiae, and Ananteris coineaui have been reported, not necessarily reliably, to reproduce through parthenogenesis, in which unfertilized eggs develop into living embryos. Receptive females produce pheromones which are picked up by wandering males using their pectines to comb the substrate. Males begin courtship by shifting their bodies back and forth, with the legs still, a behavior known as juddering. This appears to produce ground vibrations that are picked up by the female.

The pair then make contact using their pedipalps, and perform a dance called the promenade à deux (French for "a walk for two"). In this dance, the male and female move around while facing each other, as the male searches for a suitable place to deposit its spermatophore. The courtship ritual can involve several other behaviors such as a cheliceral kiss, in which the male and female grasp each other's mouth-parts, arbre droit ("upright tree") where the partners elevate their posteriors and rub their tails together, and sexual stinging, in which the male stings the female to subdue it. The dance may be minutes to hours long.

When the male has located a suitably stable surface, it deposits the spermatophore and guides the female over it. This allows the spermatophore to enter the female's genital flaps, which triggers release of the sperm, thus fertilizing the female. A mating plug then forms in the female to block further matings until it gives birth. The male and female then abruptly separate. Sexual cannibalism after mating has only been reported anecdotally in scorpions.

=== Birth and development ===
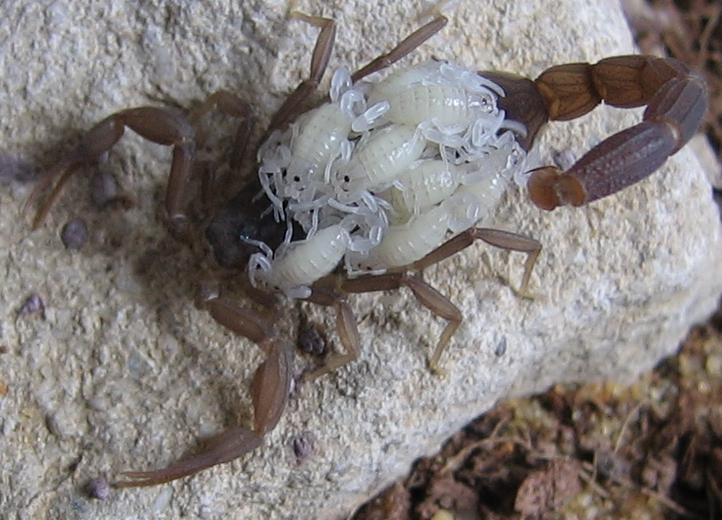
Compsobuthus werneri female with young

Gestation in scorpions can last for over a year in some species. They have two types of embryonic development; apoikogenic and katoikogenic. In the apoikogenic system, which is mainly found in the Buthidae, embryos develop in yolk-rich eggs inside egg sacs or follicles. The katoikogenic system is documented in Hemiscorpiidae, Scorpionidae and Diplocentridae, and involves the embryos growing in a pocket or diverticulum which has a teat-like structure for them to feed through. Unlike the majority of arachnids, which are oviparous, hatching from eggs, scorpions seem to be universally viviparous, with live births; though apoikogenic species are ovoviviparous where young hatch from eggs inside the mother before being born. They are unusual among terrestrial arthropods in the amount of care a female gives to her offspring. The size of a brood varies by species, from 3 to over 100. The body size of scorpions is not correlated either with litter size or with life cycle length.

Before giving birth, the female raises the front of its body and positions its pedipalps and front legs under itself for the young to fall through ("birth basket"). Each young exit through the genital flaps, expel the embryonic membrane, if any, and climb onto the mother's back where they remain until they have gone through at least one molt. The period before the first molt is called the pro-juvenile stage; the young lack the ability to eat or sting, but have suckers on their tarsi. This period lasts 5 to 25 days, depending on the species. The brood molt for the first time simultaneously in a process that lasts 6 to 8 hours, marking the beginning of the juvenile stage.

Juvenile stages or instars generally resemble smaller versions of adults, with pincers, hairs and stingers. They are still soft and colorless, and thus continue to ride on their mother's back for protection. As days pass, they become harder and more pigmented. They may leave their mother temporarily, returning when they sense potential danger. When fully hardened, young can hunt and kill on their own and eventually become fully independent. A scorpion goes through an average of six molts before maturing, which may not occur until it is 6 to 83 months old, depending on the species. They can reach an age of 25 years.

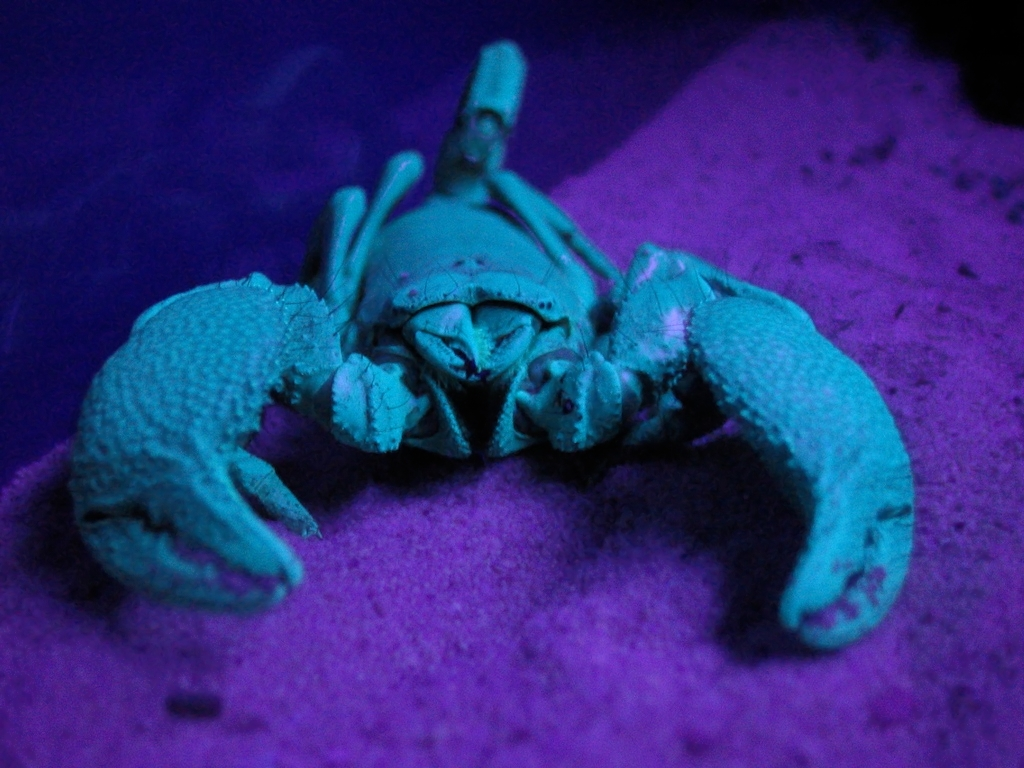
This black emperor scorpion (Pandinus imperator) fluoresces light blue.

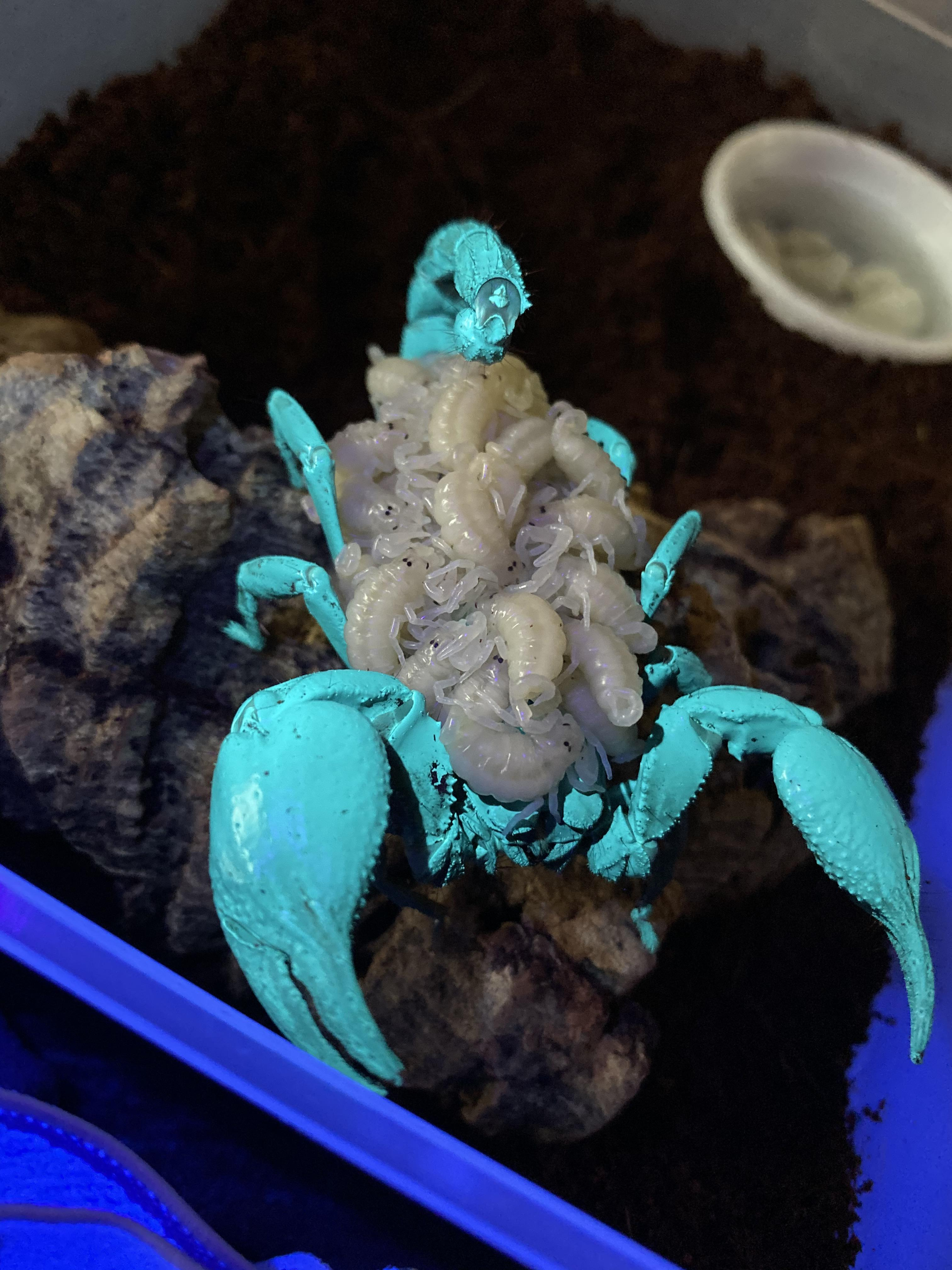
The mother glows bright teal, the young a dull grey.

=== Fluorescence ===
Scorpions glow a vibrant blue-green when exposed to certain wavelengths of ultraviolet light, such as that produced by a black light, due to fluorescent chemicals such as beta-carboline in the cuticle. Accordingly, a hand-held ultraviolet lamp has long been a standard tool for nocturnal field surveys of these animals. Fluorescence occurs as a result of sclerotization and increases in intensity with each successive instar. This fluorescence may function in detecting light.

== Relationship with humans ==
=== Stings ===
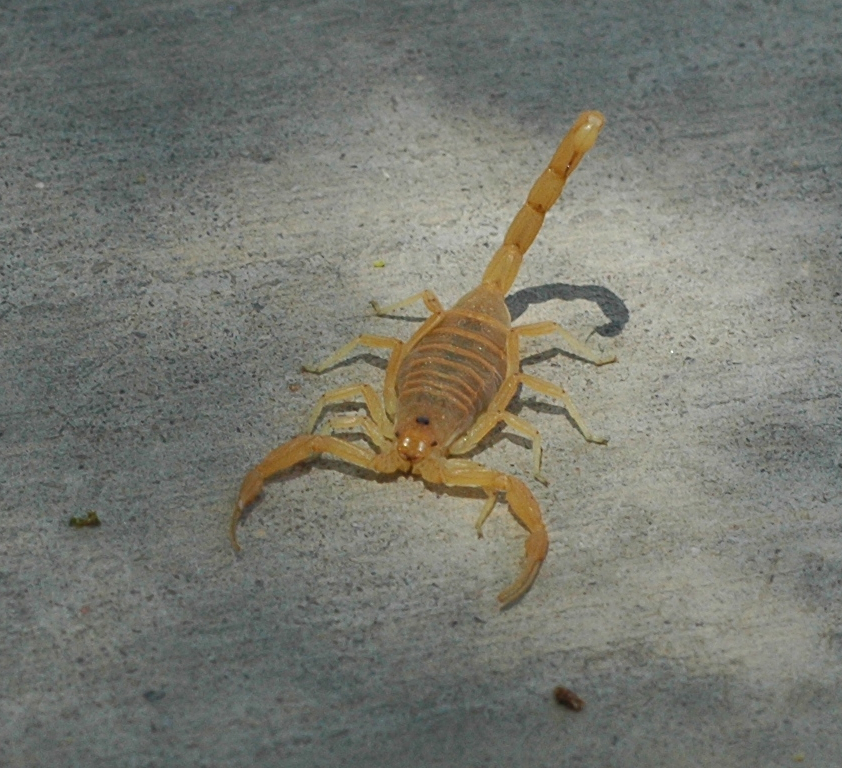
Arizona bark scorpion, one of the few species whose venom is deadly to humans

Scorpion venom serves to kill or paralyze prey rapidly, but only 25 species have venom that is deadly to humans, the most dangerous being Leiurus quinquestriatus. People with allergies are especially at risk, but otherwise symptoms typically last no more than two days for non-deadly species. Deaths from lethal stings are caused by excessive autonomic activity and toxic effects on cardiovascular or neuromuscular systems. Antivenom is used to counter scorpion envenomations, along with vasodilators to treat the cardiovascular system and benzodiazepines for the neuromuscular system. Severe hypersensitivity reactions including anaphylaxis to scorpion antivenin can occur, though rarely.

Scorpion stings are a public health problem, particularly in the tropical and subtropical regions of the Americas, North Africa, the Middle East and India. Around 1.5 million scorpion envenomations occur each year, with around 2,600 deaths. Mexico is one of the most affected countries, with the highest biodiversity of scorpions in the world, some 200,000 envenomations per year and at least 300 deaths.

Efforts are made to prevent envenomation and to control scorpion populations. Prevention encompasses personal activities such as checking shoes and clothes before putting them on, not walking in bare feet or sandals, and filling in holes and cracks where scorpions might nest. Street lighting reduces scorpion activity. Control may involve the use of insecticides such as pyrethroids, or gathering scorpions manually with the help of ultraviolet lights. Domestic predators of scorpions, such as chickens and turkeys, can help to reduce the risk to a household.

=== Potential medical use ===
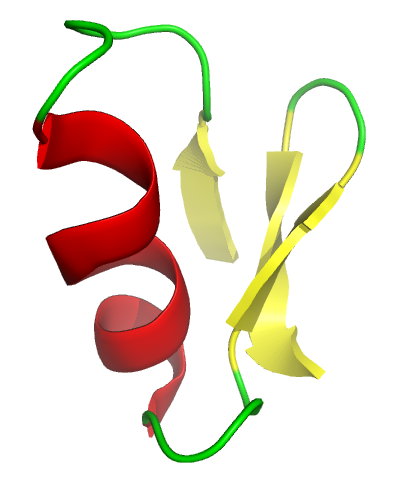
The deathstalker's powerful venom contains the 36-amino acid peptide chlorotoxin (ribbon diagram shown). This blocks small-conductance chloride channels, immobilizing its prey.

Scorpion venom is a mixture of neurotoxins; most of these are peptides, chains of amino acids. Many of them interfere with membrane channels that transport sodium, potassium, calcium, or chloride ions. These channels are essential for nerve conduction, muscle contraction and many other biological processes. Some of these molecules may be useful in medical research and might lead to the development of new disease treatments. Among their potential therapeutic uses are as analgesic, anti-cancer, antibacterial, antifungal, antiviral, antiparasitic, bradykinin-potentiating, and immunosuppressive drugs. As of 2020, no scorpion toxin-based drug is for sale, though chlorotoxin is being trialled for use against glioma, a brain cancer.

=== Consumption ===
Scorpions are eaten in West Africa, Myanmar, and East Asia. Fried scorpion is traditionally eaten in Shandong, China. There, scorpions can be cooked and eaten in a variety of ways, including roasting, frying, grilling, raw, or alive. The stingers are typically not removed, since heat negates the harmful effects of the venom. In Thailand, scorpions are not eaten as often as other arthropods, such as grasshoppers, but they are sometimes fried as street food. They are used in Vietnam to make a variant of snake wine (scorpion wine).

=== Pets ===
Scorpions are often kept as pets. They are relatively simple to keep, the main requirements being a secure enclosure such as a glass terrarium with a lockable lid and the appropriate temperature and humidity for the chosen species, which typically means installing a heating mat and spraying regularly with a little water. The substrate needs to resemble that of the species' natural environment, such as peat for forest species, or lateritic sand for burrowing desert species. Scorpions in the genera Pandinus and Heterometrus are docile enough to handle. A large Pandinus may consume up to three crickets each week. Cannibalism is more common in captivity than in the wild and can be minimized by providing many small shelters within the enclosure and ensuring there is plenty of prey. The pet trade has threatened wild populations of some scorpion species, particularly Androctonus australis and Pandinus imperator.

=== Culture ===
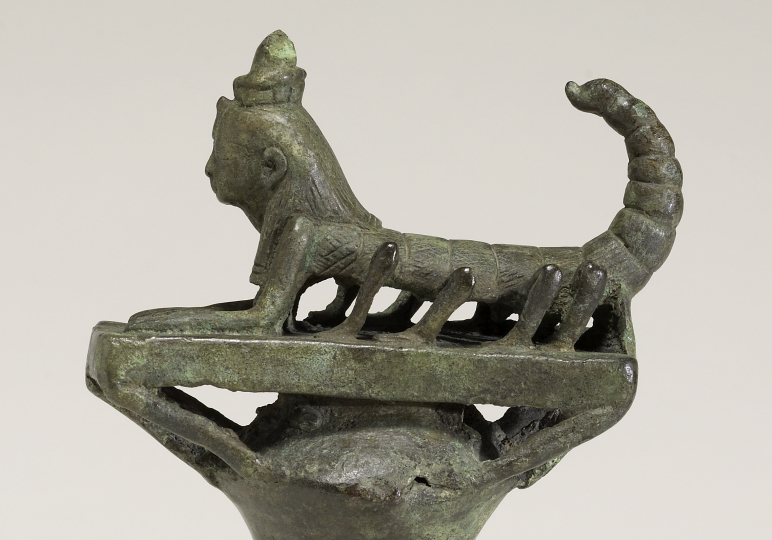
Late period bronze figure of Isis-Serket

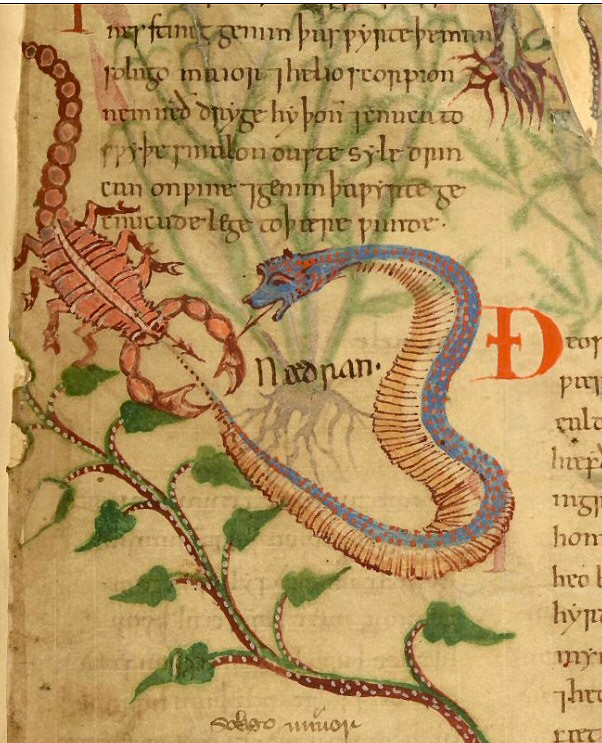
"Scorpion and snake fighting", Anglo-Saxon Herbal, c. 1050

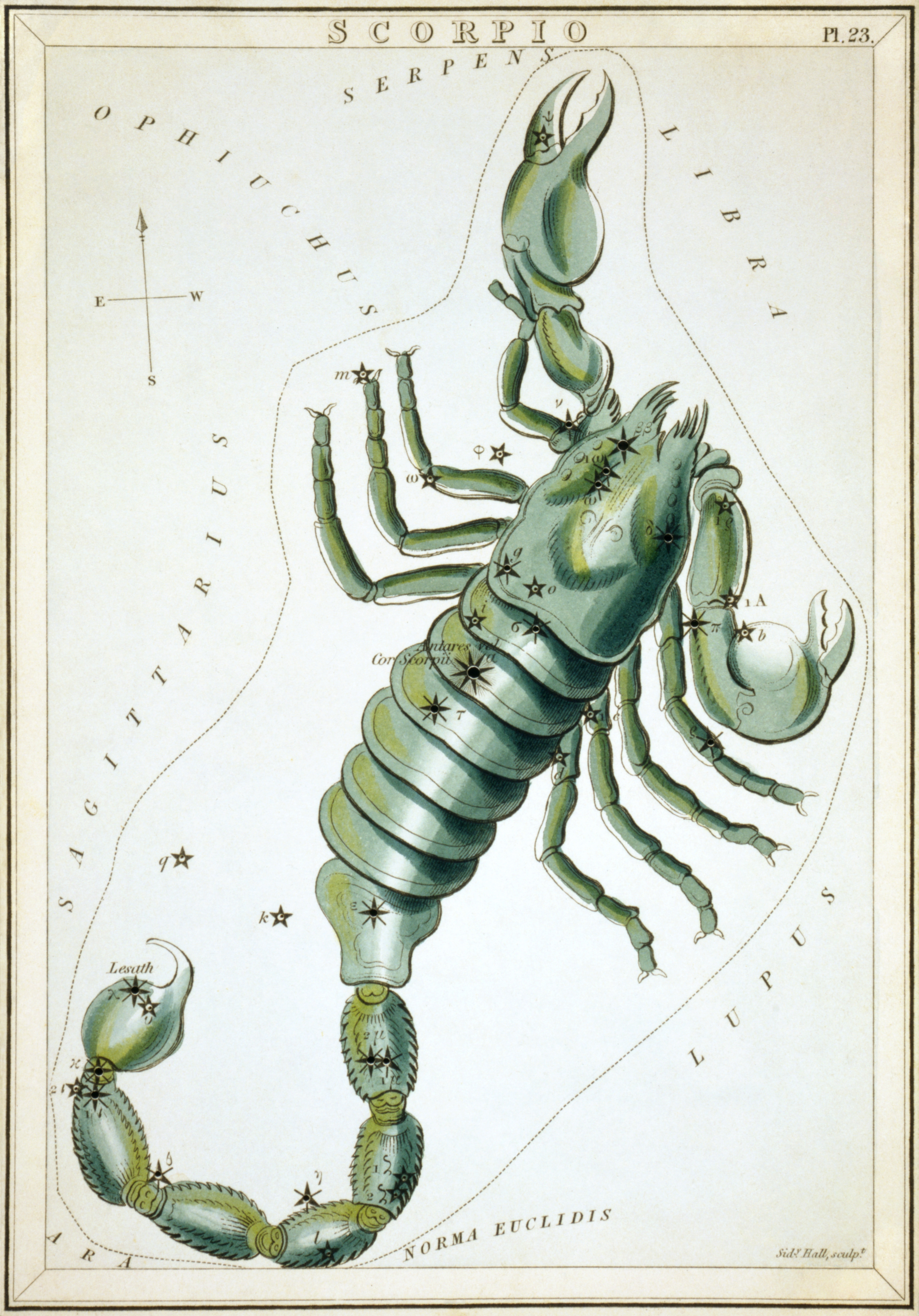
The constellation Scorpius, depicted in Urania's Mirror as "Scorpio", London, c. 1825

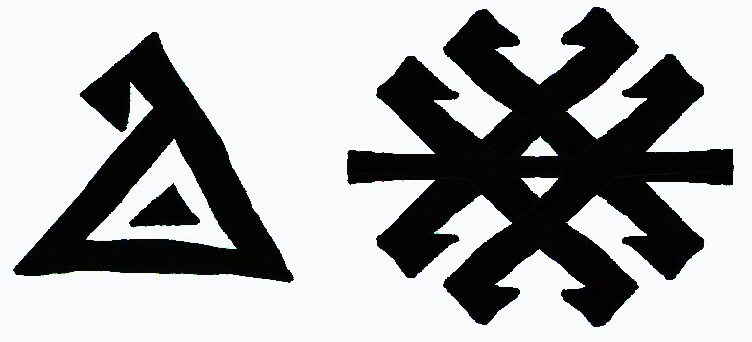
A scorpion motif (two types shown) was often woven into Turkish kilim flatweave carpets, for protection from their sting.

Scorpion pose in yoga has one or both legs pointing forward over the head, like a scorpion's tail.

The scorpion is a culturally significant animal. One of the earliest occurrences of the scorpion in culture is its inclusion, as Scorpio, in the 12 signs of the Zodiac by Babylonian astronomers during the Chaldean period. In ancient Egypt, the goddess Serket, who protected the Pharaoh, was often depicted as a scorpion. In Greek mythology, Artemis or Gaia sent a giant scorpion named Scorpius to kill the hunter Orion, who had said he would kill all the world's animals. Orion and the scorpion both became constellations; as enemies they were placed on opposite sides of the world, so when one rises in the sky, the other sets.

Scorpions are mentioned in the Bible and the Talmud as symbols of danger and maliciousness. The Sanskrit medical encyclopedia, The Suśrutasaṃhita, datable to before 500 CE, contains a detailed description of thirty types of scorpion, classified according to the levels of toxicity of their stings and their colours. Treatments for scorpion-sting are described. Scorpions have also appeared as a motif in art, especially in Islamic art in the Middle East. A scorpion motif is often woven into Turkish kilim flatweave carpets, for protection from their sting. The scorpion is perceived both as an embodiment of evil and as a protective force such as a dervish's powers to combat evil. In Muslim folklore, the scorpion portrays human sexuality. Scorpions are used in folk medicine in South Asia, especially in antidotes for scorpion stings.

The fable of The Scorpion and the Frog has been interpreted as showing that vicious people cannot resist hurting others, even when it is not in their interests. More recently, the action in John Steinbeck's 1947 novella The Pearl centers on a poor pearl fisherman's attempts to save his infant son from a scorpion sting, only to lose him to human violence. Scorpions have equally appeared in western artforms including film and poetry: the surrealist filmmaker Luis Buñuel made symbolic use of scorpions in his 1930 classic L'Age d'or (The Golden Age). A hand- or forearm-balancing asana in modern yoga as exercise with the back arched and one or both legs pointing forward over the head in the manner of the scorpion's tail is called Scorpion pose.

== Sources ==
- Polis, Gary (1990). The Biology of Scorpions. Stanford University Press. ISBN 978-0-8047-1249-1. OCLC 18991506.
- Pryke, L. M. (2016). Scorpion. Reaktion Books. ISBN 978-1-78023-625-4.
- Stockmann, Roland; Ythier, Eric (2010). Scorpions of the World. N. A. P. Editions. ISBN 978-2-913688-11-7.
- Stockmann, Roland (2015). "Introduction to Scorpion Biology and Ecology". In Gopalakrishnakone, P.; Possani, L.; F. Schwartz, E.; Rodríguez de la Vega, R. (eds.). Scorpion Venoms. Springer. pp. 25–59. ISBN 978-94-007-6403-3.
