= Wilson R. Lourenço =

French-Brazilian arachnologist specializing in scorpions

Wilson R. Lourenço is a French-Brazilian arachnologist specializing in scorpions.

== Biography ==
Wilson R. Lourenço is a French-Brazilian arachnologist who has specialized in the study of scorpions. He obtained his PhD in evolutionary biology in 1978 from the Pierre and Marie Curie University in Paris, followed by a doctorate in population biology from the same institution in 1985.

Since 1971, Lourenço has focused on the taxonomy, biology, biogeography, and ecology of scorpions. He has described numerous taxa, contributing significantly to the understanding of scorpion diversity and classification. Lourenço is currently an emeritus research fellow at the Muséum national d'histoire naturelle in Paris, where he has collaborated with international research teams from South America, Africa, and Asia.

He has published over 600 scientific papers on scorpions, addressing various aspects of their taxonomy, distribution, and ecology. His works include the book Scorpions of Brazil (2002), which serves as a comprehensive guide to the scorpion fauna of Brazil.

== Dedicated taxa ==
Other zoologists have named the following taxa after Lourenço:

- Buthus lourencoi Rossi, Tropea & Yağmur, 2013
- Diplocentrus lourencoi Stockwell, 1988
- Lychas lourencoi Kovarík, 1997
- Microchelifer lourencoi Heurtault, 1983
- Rumikiru lourencoi Ojanguren & Affilastro, 2003 (formerly Orobothriurus lourencoi)
- Simulium lourencoi Py & Daniel, 1988
- Tityus lourencoi Flórez, 1996

== Described taxa ==
Lourenço has described the following taxa:

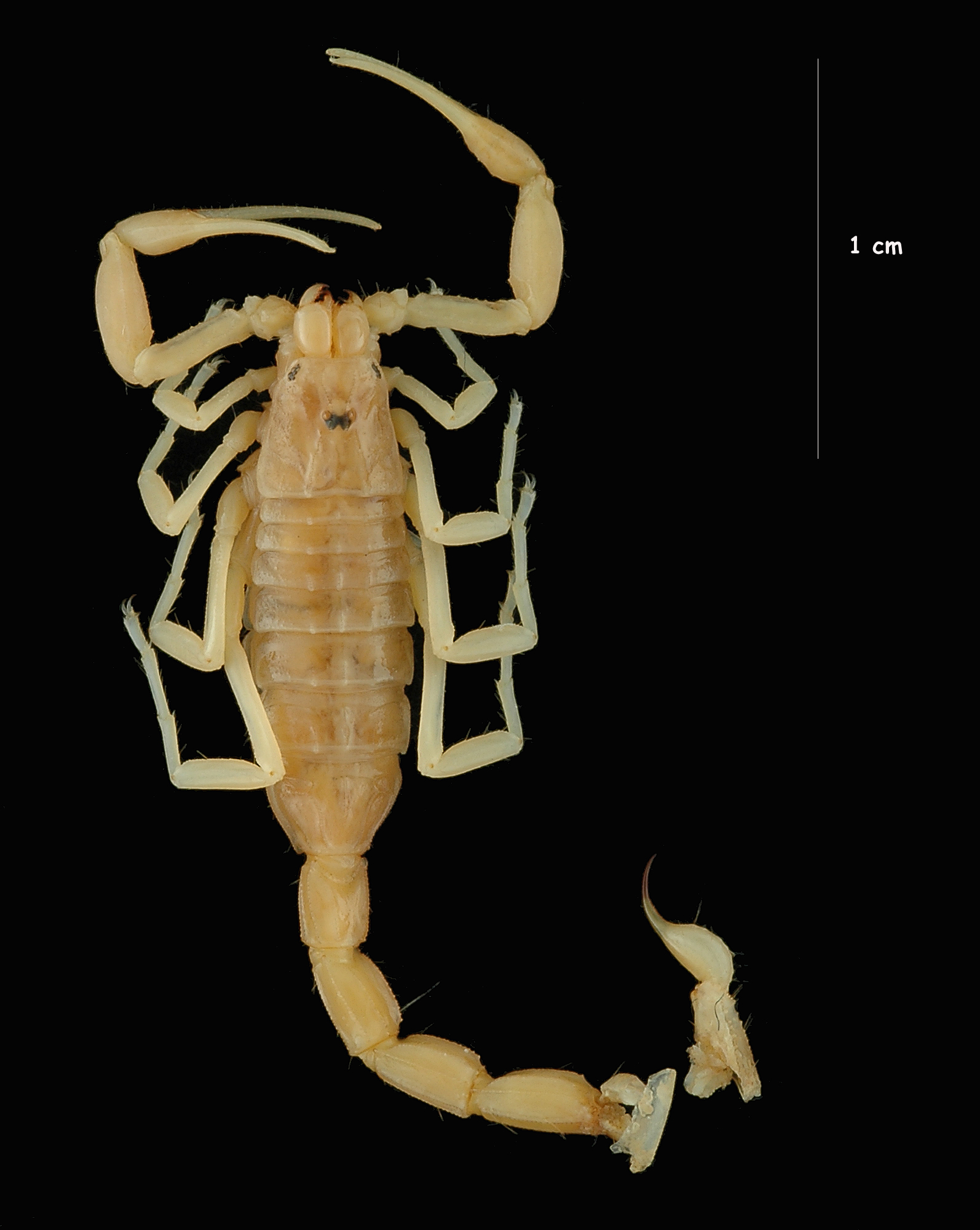
Lourenço named Afghanobuthus naumanni and its monotypic genus.

- Afghanobuthus Lourenço, 2005
- Afghanobuthus naumanni Lourenço, 2005
- Ananteris ashmolei Lourenço, 1981
- Ananteris bernabei Giupponi, Vasconcelos & Lourenço, 2009
- Ananteris cachimboensis Lourenço, Motta & da Silva, 2006
- Ananteris chagasi Giupponi, Vasconcelos & Lourenço, 2009
- Ananteris charlescorfieldi Lourenço, 2001
- Ananteris coineaui Lourenço, 1982
- Ananteris columbiana Lourenço, 1991
- Ananteris cryptozoicus Lourenço, 2005
- Ananteris dacostai Ythier, Chevalier & Lourenço, 2020
- Ananteris dekeyseri Lourenço, 1982
- Ananteris deniseae Lourenço, 1997
- Ananteris ehrlichi Lourenço, 1994
- Ananteris elisabethae Lourenço, 2003
- Ananteris evellynae Lourenço, 2004
- Ananteris franckei Lourenço, 1982
- Ananteris gorgonae Lourenço & Flórez, 1989
- Ananteris guyanensis Lourenço & Monod, 1999
- Ananteris kuryi Giupponi, Vasconcelos & Lourenço, 2009
- Ananteris leilae Lourenço, 1999
- Ananteris luciae Lourenço, 1984
- Ananteris maniapurensis González-Sponga, 2006
- Ananteris mamilihpan Ythier, Chevalier & Lourenço, 2020
- Ananteris maranhensis Lourenço, 1987
- Ananteris mariaelenae Lourenço, 1999
- Ananteris mariaterezae Lourenço, 1987
- Ananteris mauryi Lourenço, 1982
- Ananteris nairae Lourenço, 2004
- Ananteris pierrekondre Lourenço, Chevalier, Gangadin & Ythier, 2020
- Ananteris platnicki Lourenço, 1993
- Ananteris pydanieli Lourenço, 1982
- Ananteris sabineae Lourenço, 2001
- Ananteris sipilili Ythier, Chevalier & Lourenço, 2020
- Ananteris tresor Ythier, Chevalier & Lourenço, 2020
- Androctonus afghanus Lourenço & Qi, 2006
- Androctonus aleksandrplotkini Lourenço & Qi, 2007
- Androctonus dekeyseri Lourenço, 2005
- Androctonus maelfaiti Lourenço, 2005
- Androctonus maroccanus Lourenço, Ythier & Leguin, 2009
- Apistobuthus susanae Lourenço, 1998
- Archaeobuthidae Lourenço, 2001
- Archaeobuthus estephani Lourenço, 2001
- Archaeobuthus Lourenço, 2001
- Babycurus solegladi Lourenço, 2005
- Belisariini Lourenço, 1998
- Birulatus astartiae Stathi & Lourenço, 2003
- Birulatus israelensis Lourenço, 2002
- Bothriurus cerradoensis Lourenço, Motta, Godoi & Araújo, 2004
- Brachistosternus simoneae Lourenço, 2000
- Brazilobothriurus Lourenço & Monod, 2000
- Brazilobothriurus pantanalensis Lourenço & Monod, 2000
- Broteochactas amapaensis (Lourenço & Qi, 2007)
- Broteochactas gonzalezspongai (Lourenço, 1983)
- Broteochactas mascarenhasi (Lourenço, 1983)
- Brotheas amazonicus Lourenço, 1988
- Brotheas bolivianus (Lourenço, 2008)
- Brotheas henriquesi Lourenço & Machado, 2004
- Brotheas jourdani Lourenço, 1997
- Brotheas overali Lourenço, 1988
- Brotheas silvestris Lourenço, 1988
- Buthacus birulai Lourenço, 2006
- Buthacus clevai Lourenço, 2001
- Buthacus huberi Lourenço, 2001
- Buthacus mahraouii Lourenço, 2004
- Buthacus maliensis Lourenço & Qi, 2007
- Buthacus nigerianus Lourenço & Qi, 2006
- Buthacus occidentalis Lourenço, 2000
- Buthacus pakistanensis Lourenço & Qi, 2006
- Buthacus striffleri Lourenço, 2004
- Buthacus williamsi Lourenço & Leguin, 2009
- Buthacus ziegleri Lourenço, 2000
- Butheoloides annieae Lourenço, 1986
- Butheoloides charlotteae Lourenço, 2000
- Butheoloides hirsti Lourenço, 1996
- Butheoloides occidentalis Lourenço, Slimani & Berahou, 2003
- Butheoloides polisi Lourenço, 1996
- Butheoloides schwendingeri Lourenço, 2002
- Butheoloides wilsoni Lourenço, 1995
- Butheoloides aymerichi Lourenço, 2002
- Butheolus arabicus Lourenço & Qi, 2006
- Buthus albengai Lourenço, 2003
- Buthus bonito Lourenço & Geniez, 2005
- Buthus brignolii Lourenço, 2003
- Buthus draa Lourenço & Slimani, 2004
- Buthus elhennawyi Lourenço, 2005
- Buthus elizabethae Lourenço, 2005
- Buthus elmoutaouakili Lourenço & Qi, 2006
- Buthus ibericus Lourenço & Vachon, 2004
- Buthus jianxinae Lourenço, 2005
- Buthus lienhardi Lourenço, 2003
- Buthus mariefranceae Lourenço, 2003
- Buthus montanus Lourenço & Vachon, 2004
- Buthus occidentalis Lourenço, Sun & Zhu, 2009
- Buthus rochati Lourenço, 2003
- Buthus tassili Lourenço, 2002
- Buthus yemenensis Lourenço, 2008
- Centruroides mahnerti Lourenço, 1983
- Cercophonius himalayensis Lourenço, 1996
- Chactas barravierai Lourenço, 1997
- Chactas bonito Lourenço, 1996
- Chactas braziliensis Lourenço, Aguiar & Franklin, 2005
- Chactas brownelli Lourenço, 1997
- Chactas hauseri Lourenço, 1997
- Chactas koepckei Lourenço & Dastych, 2001
- Chactas mahnerti Lourenço, 1995
- Chactas mauriesi Lourenço & Florez, 1990
- Chactas ozendai Lourenço, 1999
- Chactopsis amazonica Lourenço & Francke, 1986
- Chactopsis buhrnheimi Lourenço, 2003
- Chaerilus chapmani Vachon & Lourenço, 1985
- Chaerilus conchiformus Zhu, Han & Lourenço, 2008
- Chaerilus laoticus Lourenço & Zhu, 2008
- Chaerilus philippinus Lourenço & Ythier, 2008
- Chaerilus sabinae Lourenço, 1995
- Chaerilus telnovi Lourenço, 2009
- Chaerilus tessellatus Qi, Zhu & Lourenço, 2005
- Chaerilus vietnamicus Lourenço & Zhu, 2008
- Charmus brignolii Lourenço, 2000
- Charmus minor Lourenço, 2002
- Chiromachetes tirupati Lourenço, 1997
- Cicileus cloudsleythompsoni Lourenço, 1999
- Compsobuthus andresi Lourenço, 2004
- Compsobuthus garyi Lourenço & Vachon, 2001
- Compsobuthus simoni Lourenço, 1999
- Compsobuthus tofti Lourenço, 2001
- Compsobuthus williamsi Lourenço, 1999
- Congobuthus fagei Lourenço, 1999
- Congobuthus Lourenço, 1999
- Egyptobuthus Lourenço, 1999
- Egyptobuthus vaissadei Lourenço, 1999
- Euscorpiops karschi Qi, Zhu & Lourenço, 2005
- Euscorpiops shidian Qi, Zhu & Lourenço, 2005
- Euscorpiops vachoni Qi, Zhu & Lourenço, 2005
- Euscorpiops yangi Zhu, Zhang & Lourenço, 2007
- Gallioscorpio Lourenço & Gall, 2004
- Gallioscorpio voltzi Lourenço & Gall, 2004
- Gallioscorpionidae Lourenço & Gall, 2004
- Grosphus ankarafantsika Lourenço, 2003
- Grosphus ankarana Lourenço & Goodman, 2003
- Grosphus darainensis Lourenço, Goodman & Ramilijaona, 2004
- Grosphus feti Lourenço, 1996
- Grosphus garciai Lourenço, 2001
- Grosphus goudoti Lourenço & Goodman, 2006
- Grosphus intertidalis Lourenço, 1999
- Grosphus mahafaliensis Lourenço, Goodman & Ramilijaona, 2004
- Grosphus mandena Lourenço, 2005
- Grosphus mayottensis Lourenço & Goodman, 2009
- Grosphus olgae Lourenço, 2004
- Grosphus polskyi Lourenço, Qi & Goodman, 2007
- Grosphus simoni Lourenço, Goodman & Ramilijaona, 2004
- Guyanochactas flavus Lourenço & Ythier, 2011
- Hadogenes angolensis Lourenço, 1999
- Hadrurochactas brejo (Lourenço, 1988)
- Hadrurochactas mapuera (Lourenço, 1988)
- Hadrurochactas polisi (Monod & Lourenço, 2001)
- Hadruroides udvardyi Lourenço, 1995
- Hemiscorpius acanthocercus Monod & Lourenço, 2005
- Hemiscorpius enischnochela Monod & Lourenço, 2005
- Heterometrus tibetanus Lourenço, Qi & Zhu, 2005
- Heteroscorpion goodmani Lourenço, 1996
- Heteroscorpion kraepelini Lourenço & Goodman, 2006
- Heteroscorpion magnus Lourenço & Goodman, 2002
- Heteroscorpion raselimananai Lourenço & Goodman, 2004
- Himalayotityobuthus alejandrae Lourenço, 2003
- Himalayotityobuthus Lourenço, 1997
- Himalayotityobuthus martensi Lourenço, 1997
- Hottentotta geffardi Lourenço, 2000
- Hottentotta caboverdensis Lourenço & Ythier, 2006
- Hottentotta mesopotamicus Lourenço & Qi, 2007
- Isometrus thwaitesi pallidus Lourenço & Huber, 2002
- Isometrus garyi Lourenço & Huber, 2002 Sri Lanka
- Isometrus hainanensis Lourenço, 2005
- Isometrus tibetanus Lourenço & Zhu, 2008
- Leiurus jordanensis Lourenço, Modry & Amr, 2002
- Leiurus savanicola Lourenço, Qi & Cloudsley-Thompson, 2006
- Liocheles penta Francke & Lourenço, 1991
- Lychas ceylonensis Lourenço & Huber, 1999
- Mauritanobuthus geniezi Qi &Lourenço, 2007
- Mauritanobuthus Qi & Lourenço, 2007
- Mesobuthus songi Lourenço, Qi & Zhu, 2005
- Microananteris Lourenço, 2003
- Microananteris minor Lourenço, 2003
- Microbuthus flavorufus Lourenço & Duhem, 2007
- Microbuthus maroccanus Lourenço, 2002

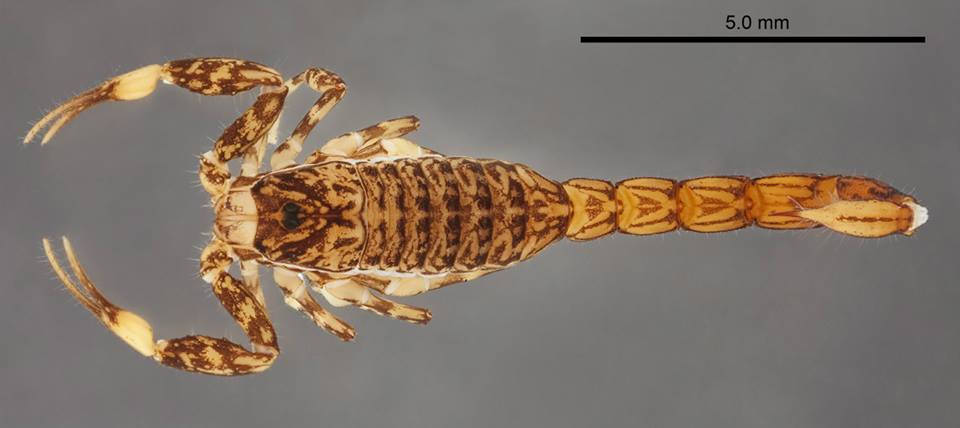
Lourenço has described the genus and many species of Microcharmus, including Microcharmus cloudsleythompsoni.

- Microcharmus Lourenço, 1995
- Microcharmus bemaraha Lourenço, Goodman & Fisher, 2006
- Microcharmus cloudsleythompsoni Lourenço, 1995
- Microcharmus confluenciatus Lourenço, Goodman & Fisher, 2006
- Microcharmus duhemi Lourenço, Goodman & Fisher, 2006
- Microcharmus fisheri Lourenço, 1998
- Microcharmus hauseri Lourenço, 1996
- Microcharmus jussarae Lourenço, 1996
- Microcharmus maculatus Lourenço, 1996
- Microcharmus madagascariensis Lourenço, 1999
- Microcharmus pauliani (Lourenço, 2004)
- Microcharmus sabineae Lourenço, 1996
- Microcharmus variegatus Lourenço, Goodman & Fisher, 2006
- Microcharmus violaceous Lourenço, Goodman & Fisher, 2006
- Microtityus starri Lourenço & Huber, 1999
- Neobuthus cloudsleythompsoni Lourenço, 2001
- Neobuthus sudanensis Lourenço, 2005
- Neochactas fravalae (Lourenço, 1983)
- Neochactas gaillardi (Lourenço, 1983)
- Neochactas kelleri (Lourenço, 1997)
- Neochactas mottai (Lourenço & Araujo, 2004)
- Neochactas sissomi (Lourenço, 1983)
- Neochactas skuki (Lourenço & Pinto-da-Rocha, 2000)
- Neogrosphus blanci Lourenço, 1996
- Neogrosphus Lourenço, 1995
- Neoprotobuthus intermedius Lourenço, 2000
- Neoprotobuthus Lourenço, 2000
- Odontobuthus bidentatus Lourenço & Pezier, 2002
- Opisthacanthus (Monodopisthacanthus) Lourenço, 2001
- Opisthacanthus borboremai Lourenço & Fe, 2003
- Opisthacanthus darainensis Lourenço & Goodman, 2006
- Opisthacanthus lamorali Lourenço, 1981 Zimbabwe
- Opisthacanthus lucienneae Lourenço & Goodman, 2006
- Opisthacanthus maculatus Lourenço & Goodman, 2006
- Opisthacanthus milloti Lourenço & Goodman, 2008
- Opisthacanthus pauliani Lourenço & Goodman, 2008
- Opisthacanthus piceus Lourenço & Goodman, 2006
- Opisthacanthus valerioi Lourenço, 1980 Costa Rica
- Orthochirus blandini (Lourenço & Vachon, 1997)
- Orthochirus danielleae (Lourenço & Vachon, 1997)
- Orthochirus erardi (Lourenço & Vachon, 1997)
- Orthochirus goyffoni (Lourenço & Vachon, 1995)
- Orthochirus kaspareki (Lourenço & Huber, 2000)
- Orthochirus kinzelbachi (Lourenço & Huber, 2000)
- Orthochirus monodi (Lourenço & Vachon, 1997)
- Orthochirus stockwelli (Lourenço & Vachon, 1995)
- Palaeoakentrobuthus knodeli Lourenço & Weitschat, 2000
- Palaeoakentrobuthus Lourenço & Weitschat, 2000
- Palaeoananteris Lourenço & Weitschat, 2001
- Palaeoananteris ribnitiodamgartensis Lourenço & Weitschat, 2001
- Palaeoananteris wunderlichi Lourenço, 2004
- Palaeoburmesebuthus grimaldii Lourenço, 2002
- Palaeoburmesebuthus Lourenço, 2002
- Palaeoeuscorpiidae Lourenço, 2003
- Palaeoeuscorpius gallicus Lourenço, 2003
- Palaeoeuscorpius Lourenço, 2003
- Palaeogrosphus copalensis (Lourenço, 1996)
- Palaeogrosphus Lourenço, 2000
- Palaeoisometrus elegans Lourenço & Weitschat, 2005
- Palaeoisometrus Lourenço & Weitschat, 2005
- Palaeolychas balticus Lourenço & Weitschat, 1996
- Palaeolychas Lourenço & Weitschat, 1996
- Palaeoprotobuthus Lourenço & Weitschat, 2000
- Palaeoprotobuthus pusillus Lourenço & Weitschat, 2000
- Palaeospinobuthus cenozoicus Lourenço, Henderickx & Weitschat, 2005
- Palaeospinobuthus Lourenço, Henderickx & Weitschat, 2005
- Palaeotityobuthus longiaculeus Lourenço & Weitschat, 2000
- Palaeotityobuthus Lourenço & Weitschat, 2000
- Paleocheloctonus Lourenço, 1996
- Palaeocheloctonus pauliani Lourenço, 1996
- Pantobuthus complicatus Lourenço & Duhem, 2009
- Pantobuthus Lourenço & Duhem, 2009

Protobuthus elegans, a Triassic scorpion described by Lourenço & Gall

- Protobuthidae Lourenço & Gall, 2004
- Protobuthus Lourenço & Gall, 2004
- Protobuthus elegans Lourenço & Gall, 2004
- Protoischnuridae Carvalho & Lourenço, 2001
- Protoischnurus axelrodorum Carvalho & Lourenço, 2001
- Protoischnurus Carvalho & Lourenço, 2001
- Pseudolissothus Lourenço, 2001
- Pseudolissothus pussilus Lourenço, 2001
- Pseudouroplectes betschi Lourenço, 1995
- Pseudouroplectes Lourenço, 1995
- Pseudouroplectes lalyae Lourenço & Ythier, 2010
- Pseudouroplectes maculatus Lourenço & Goodman, 2006
- Pseudouroplectes pidgeoni Lourenço & Goodman, 1999
- Rhopalurus amazonicus Lourenço, 1986
- Rhopalurus lacrau Lourenço & Pinto-da-Rocha, 1997
- Rhopalurus piceus Lourenço & Pinto-da-Rocha, 1997
- Sabinebuthus elegans Lourenço, 2001
- Sabinebuthus Lourenço, 2001
- Saharobuthus elegans Lourenço & Duhem, 2009
- Saharobuthus Lourenço & Duhem, 2009
- Scorpiops afghanus Lourenço & Qi, 2006
- Scorpiops atomatus Qi, Zhu & Lourenço, 2005
- Scorpiops langxian Qi, Zhu & Lourenço, 2005
- Scorpiops luridus Qi, Zhu & Lourenço, 2005
- Scorpiops pococki Qi, Zhu & Lourenço, 2005
- Tarsoporosus anchicaya Lourenço & Flórez, 1990
- Teuthraustes giupponi Lourenço & Ythier, 2017
- Teuthraustes khodayarii Lourenço & Ythier, 2017
- Teuthraustes kuryi Lourenço & Ythier, 2017
- Teuthraustes guerdouxi Lourenço, 1995
- Teuthraustes lisei Lourenço, 1994
- Tibetiomachus himalayensis Lourenço & Qi, 2006
- Tibetiomachus Lourenço & Qi, 2006
- Tityobuthus antsingy Lourenço & Goodman, 2004
- Tityobuthus betschi Lourenço, Qi & Goodman, 2008
- Tityobuthus chelbergorum Lourenço, Qi & Goodman, 2008
- Tityobuthus darainensis Lourenço & Goodman, 2002
- Tityobuthus dastychi Lourenço, 1997
- Tityobuthus griswoldi Lourenço, 2000
- Tityobuthus guillaumeti Lourenço, 1995
- Tityobuthus ivohibe Lourenço & Goodman, 1999
- Tityobuthus judsoni Lourenço, 1996
- Tityobuthus lucileae Lourenço, 1996
- Tityobuthus manonae Lourenço, 2000
- Tityobuthus mccarteri Lourenço, Qi & Goodman, 2008
- Tityobuthus monodi Lourenço, 2000
- Tityobuthus pallidus Lourenço, 2004
- Tityobuthus parrilloi Lourenço, 1996
- Tityobuthus petrae Lourenço, 1996
- Tityobuthus pococki Lourenço, 1995
- Tityobuthus rakotondravonyi Lourenço, 2003
- Tityus adisi Lourenço, 2002
- Tityus adrianoi Lourenço, 2003
- Tityus anneae Lourenço, 1997
- Tityus antioquensis Lourenço& Otero Patiño, 1998
- Tityus apiacas Lourenço, 2002
- Tityus bahiensis eickstedtae Lourenço, 1982
- Tityus bastosi Lourenço, 1984
- Tityus betschi Lourenço, 1992
- Tityus blanci Lourenço, 1994
- Tityus brazilae Lourenço & Eickstedt, 1984
- Tityus canopensis Lourenço, 2002
- Tityus cerroazul Lourenço, 1986
- Tityus chilensis Lourenço, 2005
- Tityus cisandinus Lourenço & Ythier, 2017
- Tityus confluens bodoquena Lourenço, Cabral & Bruehmueller Ramos, 2004
- Tityus crassicauda Lourenço & Ythier, 2013
- Tityus cuellari Lourenço, 1994
- Tityus demangei Lourenço, 1981
- Tityus dinizi Lourenço, 1997
- Tityus elizabethae Lourenço & Ramos, 2004
- Tityus erikae Lourenço, 1999
- Tityus exstinctus Lourenço, 1995
- Tityus florezi Lourenço, 2000
- Tityus gaffini Lourenço, 2000
- Tityus gasci Lourenço, 1982
- Tityus jeanvellardi Lourenço, 2001
- Tityus julianae Lourenço, 2005
- Tityus jussarae Lourenço, 1988
- Tityus kuryi Lourenço, 1997
- Tityus lokiae Lourenço, 2005
- Tityus marajoensis Lourenço & da Silva, 2007
- Tityus maranhensis Lourenço, de Jesus Junior & Limeira-de-Oliveira, 2006
- Tityus martinpaechi Lourenço, 2001
- Tityus matthieseni Lourenço & Pinto-da-Rocha, 2000
- Tityus melici Lourenço, 2003
- Tityus mongei Lourenço, 1996
- Tityus munozi Lourenço, 1997
- Tityus neblina Lourenço, 2008
- Tityus nelsoni Lourenço, 2005
- Tityus oteroi Lourenço, 1998
- Tityus paulistorum Lourenço & Qi, 2006
- Tityus pintodarochai Lourenço, 2005
- Tityus potameis Lourenço & Leão Giupponi, 2004
- Tityus prancei Lourenço, 2000
- Tityus raquelae Lourenço, 1988
- Tityus rebieri Lourenço, 1997
- Tityus rionegrensis Lourenço, 2006
- Tityus roigi Maury & Lourenço, 1987
- Tityus sabinae Lourenço, 1994
- Tityus sastrei Lourenço & Flórez, 1990
- Tityus sylviae Lourenço, 2005
- Tityus tayrona Lourenço, 1991
- Tityus tucurui Lourenço, 1988
- Tityus unus Lourenço & Pinto-da-Rocha, 2000
- Tityus ythieri Lourenço, 2007
- Tityus vaissadei Lourenço, 2002
- Troglokhammouanus Lourenço, 2007
- Troglokhammouanus steineri Lourenço, 2007
- Troglorhopalurus Lourenço, Baptista & Giupponi, 2004
- Troglorhopalurus translucidus Lourenço, Baptista & Giupponi, 2004
- Troglotayosicidae Lourenço, 1998
- Troglotayosicus Lourenço, 1981
- Troglotayosicus vachoni Lourenço, 1981
- Troglotityobuthus Lourenço, 2000
- Uroplectes machadoi Lourenço, 2000
- Uroplectoides abyssinicus Lourenço, 1998
- Uroplectoides Lourenço, 1998
- Vachoniochactas ashleeae Lourenço, 1994
