= Taxonomy of scorpions =

Taxonomic classification of scorpions

The taxonomy of scorpions deals with the classification of this predatory arthropod into 13 extant families and about 1,400 described species and subspecies. In addition, 111 described taxa of extinct scorpions are known.

The classification is based on that of Soleglad and Fet (2003), which replaced the older, unpublished classification of Stockwell. Additional taxonomic changes are from papers by Soleglad et al. (2005). The classification proposed by Fet and Soleglad in 2003 and subsequent papers has not been universally accepted; some authorities have challenged their methodology as invalid.

== Taxonomy ==
Order Scorpiones

- Infraorder Orthosterni Pocock, 1911
  - Parvorder Pseudochactida Soleglad et Fet, 2003
    - Superfamily Pseudochactoidea Gromov, 1998
      - Family Pseudochactidae Gromov, 1998
  - Parvorder Buthida Soleglad et Fet, 2003
    - Superfamily Buthoidea C. L. Koch, 1837
      - Family Buthidae C. L. Koch, 1837 (thick-tailed scorpions)
      - Family Microcharmidae Lourenço, 1996
  - Parvorder Chaerilida Soleglad et Fet, 2003
    - Superfamily Chaeriloidea Pocock, 1893
      - Family Chaerilidae Pocock, 1893
        - Subfamily Chearilinae Pocock, 1893
        - † Subfamily Electrochearilinae Fet, Soleglad et Anderson 2004 (extinct)
  - Parvorder Iurida Soleglad et Fet, 2003
    - Superfamily Chactoidea Pocock, 1893
      - Family Chactidae Pocock, 1893
        - Subfamily Chactinae Pocock, 1893
          - Tribe Chactini Pocock, 1893
          - Tribe Nullibrotheini Soleglad et Fet, 2003
        - Subfamily Brotheinae Simon, 1879
          - Tribe Belisariini Lourenço, 1998
          - Tribe Brotheini Simon, 1879
            - Subtribe Brotheina Simon, 1879
            - Subtribe Neochactina Soleglad et Fet, 2003
        - Subfamily Uroctoninae
      - Family Euscorpiidae Laurie, 1896
        - Subfamily Euscorpiinae Laurie, 1896
        - Subfamily Megacorminae Kraepelin, 1905
          - Tribe Chactopsini Soleglad et Sissom, 2001
          - Tribe Megacormini Kraepelin, 1905
        - Subfamily Scorpiopinae Kraepelin, 1905
          - Tribe Scorpiopini Kraepelin, 1905
          - Tribe Troglocormini Soleglad et Sissom, 2001
      - Family Superstitioniidae Stahnke, 1940
        - Subfamily Superstitioniinae Stahnke, 1940
        - Subfamily Typlochactinae Mitchell, 1971
      - Family Vaejovidae Thorell, 1876
    - Superfamily Iuroidea Thorell, 1876
      - Family Caraboctonidae Kraepelin, 1905 (hairy scorpions)
        - Subfamily Caraboctoninae Kraepelin, 1905
        - Subfamily Hadrurinae Stahnke, 1974
      - Family Iuridae Thorell, 1876
    - Superfamily Scorpionoidea Latreille, 1802
      - Family Bothriuridae Simon, 1880
        - Subfamily Bothriurinae Simon, 1880
        - Subfamily Lisposominae Lawrence, 1928
      - Family Hemiscorpiidae Pocock, 1893 (= Ischnuridae, =Liochelidae) (rock scorpions, creeping scorpions, or tree scorpions)
        - Subfamily Hemiscorpiinae Pocock, 1893
        - Subfamily Heteroscorpioninae Kraepelin, 1905
        - Subfamily Hormurinae Laurie, 1896
      - † Family Protoischnuridae Carvalho et Lourenço 2001 (extinct)
      - Family Scorpionidae Latreille, 1802 (burrowing scorpions or pale-legged scorpions)
        - Subfamily Diplocentrinae Karsch, 1880
          - Tribe Diplocentrini Karsch, 1880
          - Tribe Nebini Kraepelin, 1905
        - Subfamily Scorpioninae Latreille, 1802
        - Subfamily Urodacinae Pocock, 1893
    - Superfamily incertae sedis
      - † Family Palaeoeuscorpiidae Lourenço 2003 (extinct)
  - Parvorder incertae sedis
    - † Family Archaeobuthidae Lourenço 2003 (extinct)
    - † Family Palaeopisthacanthidae Kjellesvig-Wæring 1986 (extinct)
    - † Family Protobuthidae Lourenço et Gall 2003 (extinct)
    - † Family incertae sedis (contains genera Corniops Jeram 1994; Palaeoburmesebuthus Lourenço 2002; Sinoscorpius Hong 1983).
