= BotIT6 =

BotIT6 is a toxin that binds to insect voltage gated sodium channels. It decreases the amplitude of the action potential, leading to paralysis.

== Etymology and Source ==
BotIT6 is a neurotoxin produced by the common European scorpion, which is also known as the Buthus occitanus tunetanus. It is therefore appropriately named buthus occitanus tunetanus insect toxin 6 (BotIT6).

== Chemistry ==
Structure BotIT6 consists of 62 amino-acids and has an experimentally determined molecular mass of 7260.84 Da.

N'-DGYPKQKNGCKYDCIINNKWCNGIC-KMHGGYGGYCWG-WGLACWC-EGLP-EDKKWWYETN-K-CGR-C'
The amino-acid sequence of BotIT6

== Family ==
BotIT6 belongs to the Buthidae neurotoxin family. The toxins can be divided into groups based on their target animal. BotIT6 is targeted at insects. Toxins directed against insects, the main target being the sodium channels, can be divided into four groups, namely excitatory toxins, depressant toxins, α-type toxins and a group affecting both mammals and insects. Each group causes paralysis, albeit via different mechanisms. The BotIT6 has characteristics of depressant, excitatory and α subgroups.

== Homology ==
From an evolutionary perspective BotIT6 is linked to both the depressant and the α group. BotIT6 is similar to depressant insect toxins, but also has similarities to α type and excitatory toxins. BotIT6 shares 58-66% of its amino-acid sequence with depressant insect toxins, and 24-34% with alfa type and excitatory toxins. In addition, it shares functional characteristics with all three groups. This has led to the hypothesis that BotIT6 could be an ancestral depressant toxin.

== Target ==
BotIT6 is directed specifically against insect voltage-gated sodium channels. There are no known mammalian sodium channels affected by BotIT6.

== Mode of action ==
The exact mechanism of BotIT6 is still unclear. The neuropeptide binds to site 4 of voltage-gated sodium channels. The membrane of the axon is likely to be depolarized. Next, the sodium current is slowed down by BotIT6, which decreases the amplitude of the action potential. Eventually these events lead to paralysis. In artificial environments the effect of BotIT6 is less potent than it is in vivo, which might be explained by other toxic neuropeptides in the venom of the scorpion. These neuropeptide toxins may cooperate to make venom more effective. Another possibility is the presence of other more potent toxins in the venom. These toxins often share many characteristics, which means they partially overlap in binding sites. BotIT6 is known to compete with other neurotoxins, I-AaHIT and I-BotIT2, over the same binding site on the sodium channels for these toxins.

== Toxicity ==
Bot1T6 is a positively charged basic structure. Basic toxins are usually more potent than acidic ones. In addition, within the Buthidae neurotoxin family toxins, a higher total positive charge leads to a more toxic neuropeptide. These characteristics contribute in making Bot1T6 a very effective insect toxin. For cockroaches for instance, the LD_{50} is 10 ng/100 mg. Amongst other things this toxin leads to different forms of paralysis and uncoordinated motion. Although paralysis can sometimes be reversed but death can also occur without any previous warning symptoms. These effects occur only in insects.

== Possible use ==
The possible effects of BotIT6 on mammals, when ingested per os, are still unclear. However, it is unlikely mammals would be harmed using this toxin, as BotIT6 is insect sodium channel specific. This makes BotIT6 a possible candidate for agricultural use as an insecticide.
