= Chaerilus ceylonensis =

Scientific classification
- Kingdom: Animalia
- Phylum: Arthropoda
- Subphylum: Chelicerata
- Class: Arachnida
- Order: Scorpiones
- Family: Chaerilidae
- Genus: Chaerilus
- Species: C. ceylonensis

Binomial name
- Chaerilus ceylonensis Pocock, 1894

Species of scorpion

Chaerilus ceylonensis is a species of scorpion in Chaerilidae family. It is endemic to Sri Lanka.

== Description ==
Total length is 27 to 45 mm.
