= E. montanus =

E. montanus may refer to:

- Eleutherodactylus montanus, frog endemic to the Dominican Republic
- Eremias montanus, lizard found in the Alvand Mountains in Hamadan Province, Iran
- Euscorpiops montanus, scorpion native to Bhutan, India and Pakistan
