= Chaerilus celebensis =

Scientific classification
- Domain: Eukaryota
- Kingdom: Animalia
- Phylum: Arthropoda
- Subphylum: Chelicerata
- Class: Arachnida
- Order: Scorpiones
- Family: Chaerilidae
- Genus: Chaerilus
- Species: C. celebensis

Binomial name
- Chaerilus celebensis (Pocock, 1894)

Species of scorpion

Chaerilus celebensis also known as the Asian bush scorpion or speckled bush scorpion is a species of scorpion from the family Chaerilidae. It was described in 1894 by Reginald Innes Pocock, using material from Luwu on the island of Sulawesi (Celebes) in Indonesia. Although it has been reported from a number of locations in Southeast Asia, the only reliable records are from Luwu. Specimens are stocky and barely exceed 1.5 inches (38 mm) in length. They rarely sting and their venom is of little or no medical significance. They live in tropical forests, but remain in the soil and mulch, graze on low vegetation and insects and are not capable of climbing vertical surfaces.
