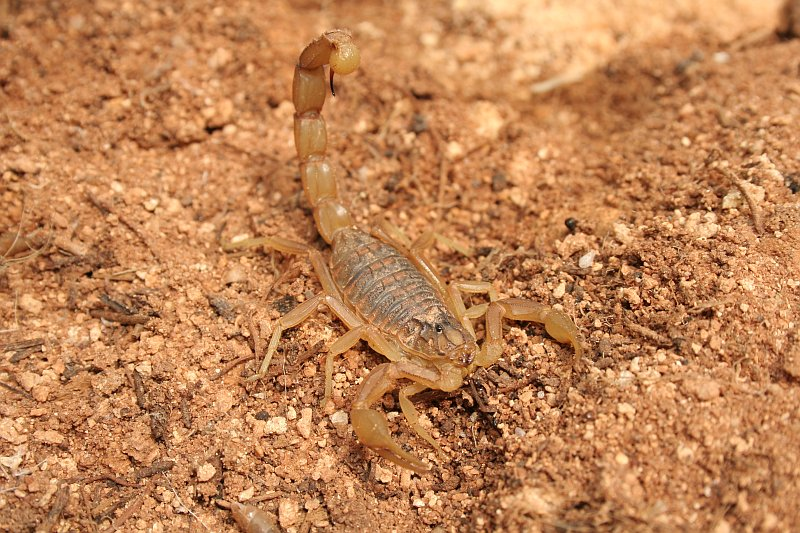
- Buthus occitanus (Amoreux, 1789)

Scientific classification
- Kingdom: Animalia
- Phylum: Arthropoda
- Subphylum: Chelicerata
- Class: Arachnida
- Order: Scorpiones
- Family: Buthidae
- Genus: Buthus; Leach, 1815

Type species
- Buthus occitanus Amoreux, 1789

Diversity
- At least 75 species

= Buthus =

Genus of arachnids

Buthus is a genus of scorpion belonging and being eponymous to the family Buthidae. It is distributed widely across northern Africa, including Morocco, Mauritania, Algeria, Tunisia, Libya, Egypt, Senegal, Guinea-Bissau, Nigeria, Sudan, Somalia, Ethiopia, Djibouti, as well as the Middle East, including Israel, Palestine, Jordan, Lebanon, Iraq, Yemen, and possibly Saudi Arabia and southern Turkey. Its European range includes the Iberian Peninsula, southern France, and Cyprus.

== Taxonomy ==
The genus was introduced by W.E. Leach (1815: 391). It was only the second genus of scorpion as all species known to this date were included in the sole genus Scorpio Linné, 1758. Leach found Scorpio occitanus Amoreux, 1789 to differ from the other species of Scorpio known to him by having eight eyes (two median eyes and six lateral eyes) instead of six (two median eyes and four lateral eyes). C.L. Koch (1837) expanded this concept and subdivided the scorpions in four families according to the number of their eyes. He named his second family, the "eight-eyed scorpions", Buthides. The use of the number of eyes in the classification of scorpions has been discarded since, however the name Buthidae is still in use for the most diverse family of scorpions.

=== Diversity ===
The content of this genus may vary, depending on the authority. The best known species, B. occitanus, was once thought to be widespread from southern France, throughout Spain and Morocco, along the southern coast of the Mediterranean Sea, and eastwards as far as Israel. However, recent research has shown that it forms a highly diverse cluster of closely related but separate species. A number of taxa formerly considered as subspecies or "varieties" have been granted full species status, others have been described as entirely new. The Moroccan Atlas region is a hot-spot of diversity with at least 14 species. This diversity is explained by the topography which led to a high degree of speciation in populations which are separated from others by mountain ranges. Four species are considered to occur in Europe: B. occitanus (southern France, eastern and southern Spain), B. montanus (mountain ranges of southeastern Spain), B. ibericus (western Spain and Portugal), and B. kunti (Cyprus). At least 75 species are known, many of which are quite similar in appearance:

- Buthus adrianae Rossi, 2013
- Buthus ahaggar Ythier, Sadine, Haddadi & Lourenco, 2021
- Buthus ajax (C. L. Koch, 1839)
- Buthus alacanti Teruel & Turiel, 2020
- Buthus albengai Lourenço, 2003
- Buthus amri Lourenço, Yağmur & Duhem, 2010
- Buthus apiatus Lourenço, El Bouhissi & Sadine, 2020
- Buthus atlantis Pocock, 1889
- Buthus aures Lourenço & Sadine, 2016
- Buthus awashensis Kovařík, 2011
- Buthus baeticus Teruel & Turiel, 2020
- Buthus barcaeus Birula, 1909
- Buthus berberensis Pocock, 1900
- Buthus bobo Ythier, 2021
- Buthus bonito Lourenço & Geniez, 2005
- Buthus boumalenii Touloun & Boumezzough, 2011
- Buthus boussaadi Lourenço, Chichi & Sadine, 2018
- Buthus brignolii Lourenço, 2003
- Buthus centroafricanus Lourenço, 2016
- Buthus chambiensis Kovařík, 2006
- Buthus confluens Lourenço, Touloun & Boumezzough, 2012
- Buthus danyii Rossi, 2017
- Buthus delafuentei Teruel & Turiel, 2020
- Buthus draa Lourenço & Slimani, 2004
- Buthus dunlopi Kovařík, 2006
- Buthus duprei Rossi & Tropea, 2016
- Buthus egyptiensis Lourenço, 2012
- Buthus elhennawyi Lourenço, 2005
- Buthus elizabethae Lourenço, 2005
- Buthus elmoutakoualiki Lourenço & Qi, 2006
- Buthus elongatus Rossi, 2012
- Buthus gabani Ythier, 2021
- Buthus garcialorcai Teruel & Turiel, 2020
- Buthus goyffoni Abidi, Sadine & Lourenco, 2021
- Buthus halius (C. L. Koch, 1839)
- Buthus hassanini Lourenço, Duhem & Cloudsley-Thompson, 2012
- Buthus ibericus Lourenço & Vachon, 2004
- Buthus intermedius (Ehrenberg, 1829)
- Buthus intumescens (Hemprich in Hemprich & Ehrenberg, 1828)
- Buthus israelis Shulov & Amitai, 1959
- Buthus jianxinae Lourenço, 2005
- Buthus karoraensis Rossi & Tropea, 2016
- Buthus kunti Yağmur, Koç & Lourenço, 2011
- Buthus labuschagnei Lourenço, 2015
- Buthus lienhardi Lourenço, 2003
- Buthus lourencoi Rossi, Tropea & Yagmur, 2013
- Buthus lusitanus Lourenço, 2021
- Buthus malhommei Vachon, 1949
- Buthus manchego Teruel & Turiel, 2020
- Buthus mardochei Simon, 1878
- Buthus mariaefrancae Lourenço, 2003
- Buthus maroccanus Birula, 1903
- Buthus montanus Lourenço & Vachon, 2004
- Buthus nabataeus Lourenço, Abu Afifeh & Al-Saraireh, 2021
- Buthus nigrovesiculosus Hirst, 1925
- Buthus occidentalis Lourenço, Sun & Zhou, 2009
- Buthus occitanus (Amoreux, 1789) type species
- Buthus orientalis Lourenço & Simon, 2012
- Buthus oudjanii Lourenço, 2017
- Buthus paris (C.L. Koch, 1839)
- Buthus pedrosousai Teruel & Turiel, 2021
- Buthus pococki Kovarik, Stahlavsky & Elmi, 2020
- Buthus prudenti Lourenço & Leguin, 2012
- Buthus pusilus Lourenço, 2013
- Buthus pyrenaeus Ythier, 2021
- Buthus rochati Lourenço, 2003
- Buthus saharicus Sadine, Bissati & Lourenço, 2015
- Buthus serrano Teruel & Turiel, 2020
- Buthus somalilandus Kovarik, Stahlavsky & Elmi, 2020
- Buthus tassili Lourenço, 2002
- Buthus trinacrius Lourenço & Rossi, 2013
- Buthus tunetanus (Herbst, 1800)
- Buthus yemenensis Lourenço, 2008
- Buthus zeylensis Pocock, 1900

== General characteristics ==
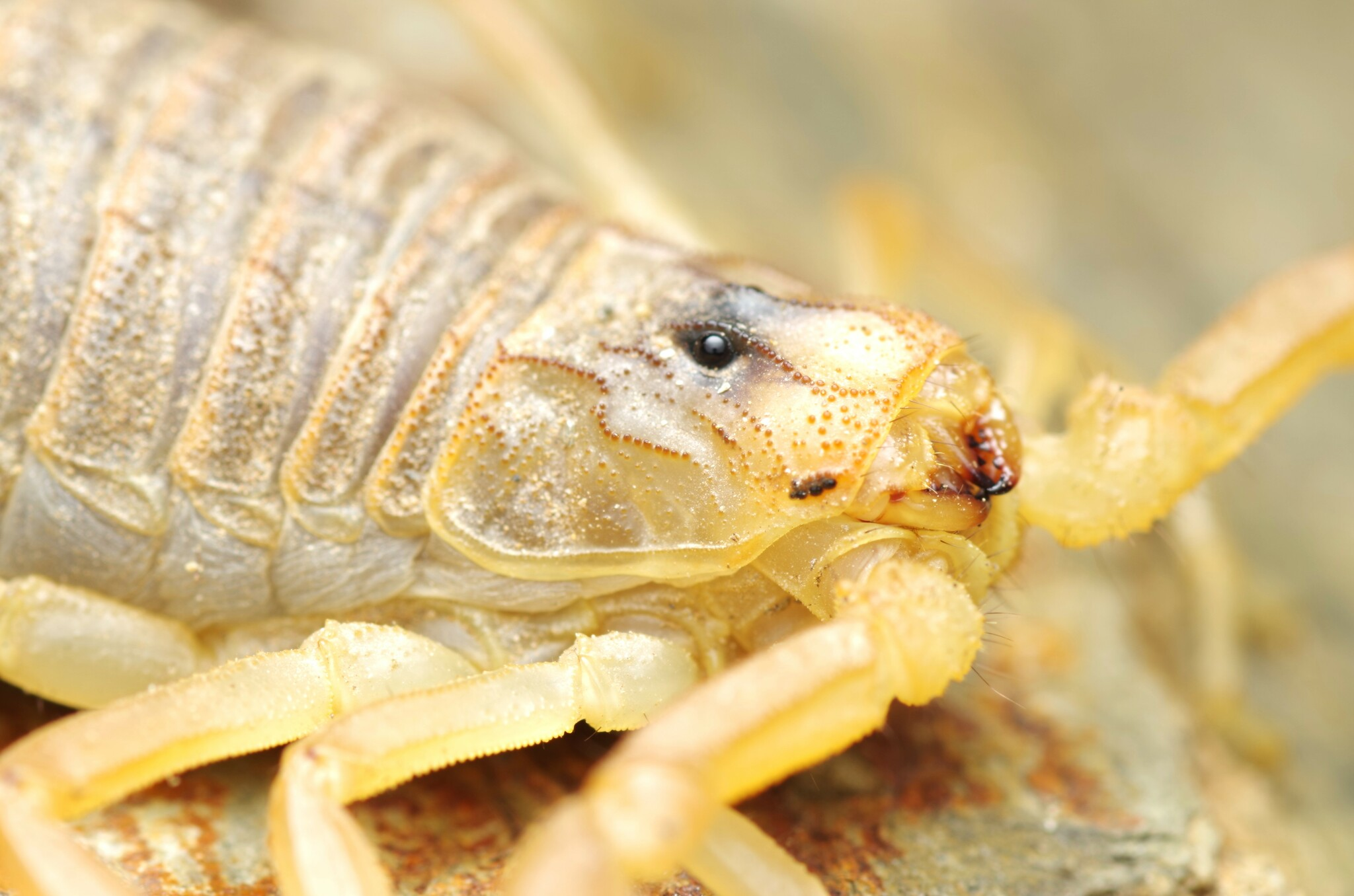
The lyra-shaped carinae pattern behind the median eyes of Buthus pyrenaeus

Members of Buthus are generally medium-sized scorpions (40–85 mm total length). Coloration is generally yellow, with different tones of brown to red-brown. Darker patterns may occur on various parts of the body. The pedipalps (pincers) are relatively gracile with slender digits and a globose base. The cephalothorax bears strong ornamentation with small granules arranged to form carinae (ridges). The most prominent carinae form a lyra-shaped pattern behind the median eyes in many species. The mesosoma is also often granulated and commonly bears three ridges on the tergites. The metasoma is slender but not thin with well developed carinae of granules, and some short spines in some species. A large vesicle terminates in a sharp and long aculeus (stinger).

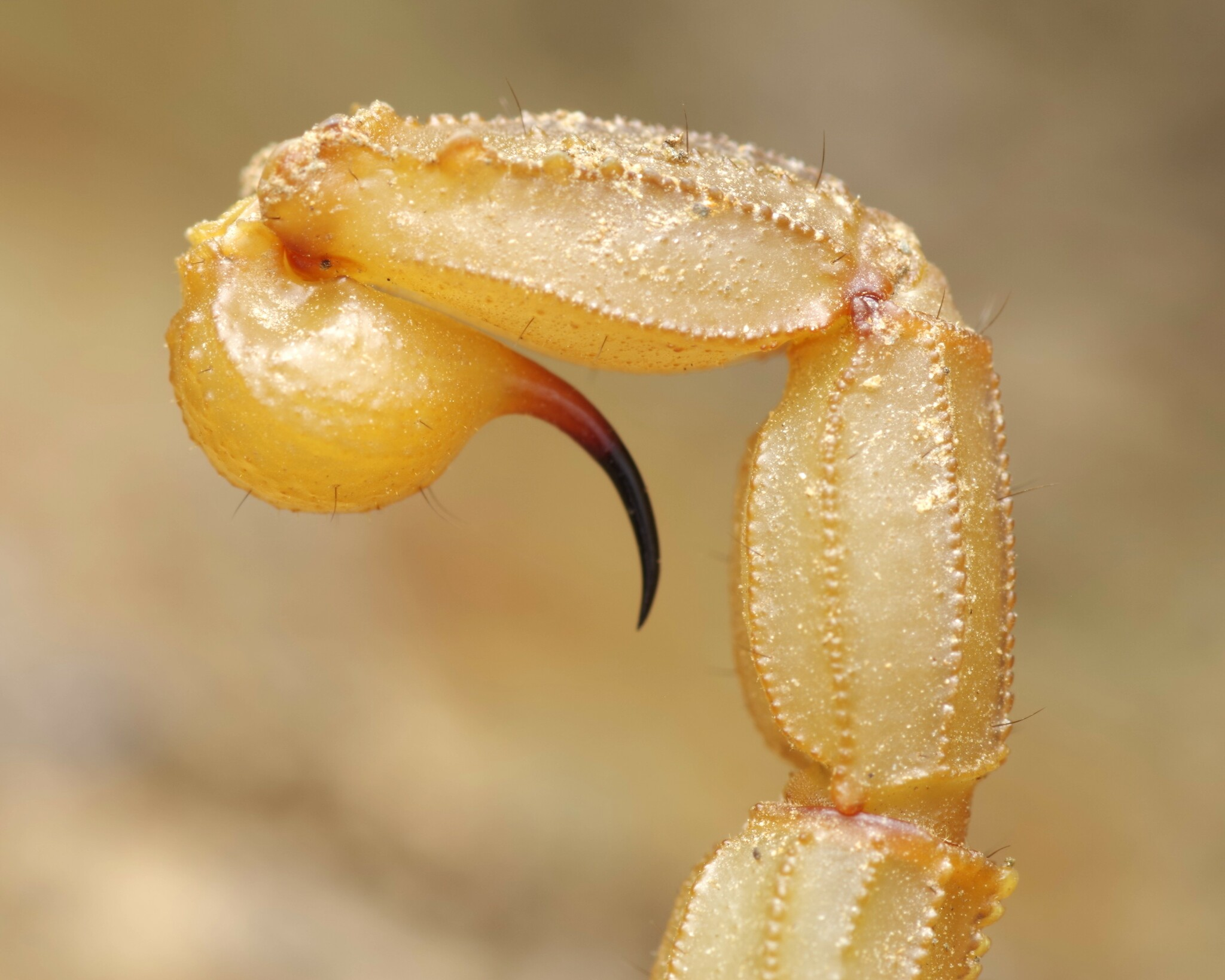
A metasoma of B. pyrenaeus showing well developed carinae of granules

=== Toxicity ===
Though generally not considered lethal, the venom of Buthus species is considered of medical importance. They form a considerable part of scorpion envenomation cases, especially in northern Africa. According to a study by Touloun et al. (2001) scorpions of the B. occitanus complex caused 26% of all recorded cases in southwestern Morocco, but none of them resulted in death.

== Habitat ==
Species of Buthus live in semi-arid to arid climate in various terrains, from mountain valleys to coastal plains mostly with sparse vegetation, even in deserts. As most scorpions they are predominantly nocturnal and hide in shallow burrows, most commonly below stones.
