= Ctri9577 =

Scorpion toxin

Ctri9577 (α-KTx15.10) is a neurotoxin present in the venom of the Chaerilus tricostatus scorpion, which is a potent blocker of the voltage-gated potassium channel Kv1.3, and a gating modifier of Kv4.3 channels.

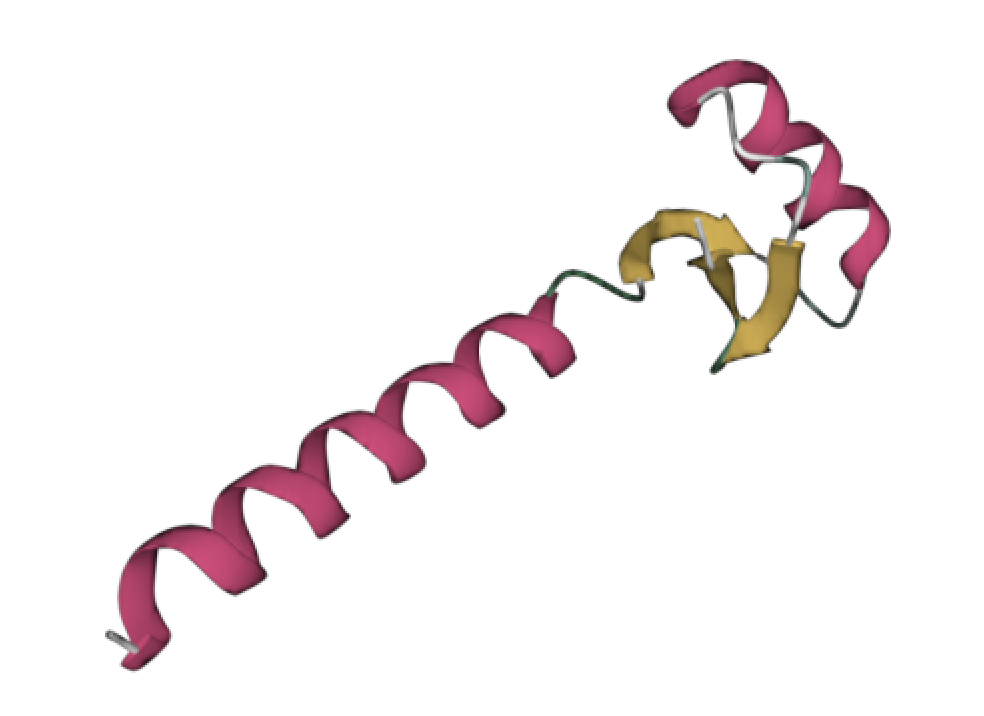
Predicted secondary structure of Ctri9577. Ctri9577 contains two alpha-helices (pink), connected to three anti-parallel beta-sheets (yellow), and loops (green). The left helix will be removed in the mature protein. Image adapted from AlphaFold.

Ctri9577
Source	Chaerilus tricostatus (scorpion)
Subfamily	α-KTx15
Sequence (Signal sequence) (Mature protein)	MKLVMRILLTCFLLTTLVIKAEGQIHTNQPCTSNN TRCRTYCIKVHKINSGKCMNSKCVCHP
Molecular weight	4439.7 Da
Uniprot	P0DJO5

== Etymology and Source ==
The Ctri9577 toxin is a component of the venom of the scorpion Chaerilus tricostatus. The name of the toxin derives from the first letter of the genus of Chaerilus (C), species (tri), and the clone number in the cDNA library (9577).

== Chemistry ==
Ctri9577 is a member of the α-KTx15 subfamily, which specifically targets potassium channels. The mature peptide of Ctri9577, which is the peptide without the signal sequence, consists of 39 amino acids (4.44 kDa), including six cysteines which form three disulfide bridges (see table 1). Other scorpion toxins specific for K^{+} channels (KTx) commonly form a CSα/β (cysteine-stabilized α-helix-β-sheet) fold. In this motif, an α-helix is connected to two or three antiparallel β-sheets and stabilized with disulfide bridges.

The predicted secondary structure of Ctri9577 is based on the typical fold of other scorpion KTxs; it consists of an α-helix connected to three antiparallel β-sheets, which is stabilized with three disulfide bridges (see figure 1).

Ctri9577 has low sequence similarity (<50%) with most other members of the α-KTx15 subfamily., placing it far away on the phylogenetic tree.

== Target ==
Ctri9577 is a toxin specific for voltage-gated potassium channels, which functions both as a potent Kv1.3 channel-blocker and a gating modifier of Kv4.3 channels. The Kv1.3 channels are inhibited with an IC_{50} of 0.49 ± 0.45 nM. Ctri9577 also modifies the gating of Kv4.3 channels through binding with the S3b-S4 linker within the voltage-sensing domain of the channel, in which four residues are of importance: L275, V276, N280, and V288. Ctri9577’s inhibition of Kv4.3 channel currents is much less potent (IC_{50}-value of 1.34 ± 0.03 μM) than the block of Kv1.3 channels.

== Mode of action ==
The inhibitory effect of Ctri9577 on Kv1.3 channels is voltage-independent. The blocking of the delayed rectifier Kv1.3 is expected to slow down the repolarization phase of the action potential.

Ctri9577's effect on Kv4.3 gating occurs through:

- shifting activation to more positive potentials
- shifting steady-state inactivation curves to more positive potentials, and
- slower recovery from open-state inactivation.

As a result, Kv4.3 channels will be inhibited.
