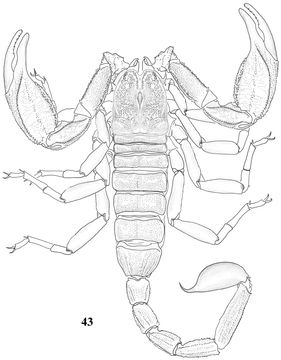
- Scorpiops luridus

Scientific classification
- Kingdom: Animalia
- Phylum: Arthropoda
- Subphylum: Chelicerata
- Class: Arachnida
- Order: Scorpiones
- Family: Scorpiopidae
- Tribe: Scorpiopini
- Genus: Scorpiops; Peters, 1861

Type species
- Scorpio hardwickii Gervais, 1843

Diversity
- 115 species

Synonyms
- Dasyscorpiops Vachon, 1974; Alloscorpiops Stockwell, 1989; Plethoscorpiops Lourenço, 2017

= Scorpiops =

Genus of scorpions

Scorpiops is a genus of scorpions in the family Scorpiopidae. It is distributed throughout much of Asia. The taxonomy of the group is unclear because new species and subgenera are described often, and one subgroup may represent a species complex.

== Species ==
Scorpiops contains the following over one hundred species:

- Scorpiops affinis Kraepelin, 1898
- Scorpiops afghanus Lourenço & Qi, 2006
- Scorpiops alexandreanneorum (Lourenço, 2013)
- Scorpiops anthracinus (Simon, 1887)
- Scorpiops artemisae (Kovarik, Košulič, Stahlavsky, Dongkhamfu & Wongprom 2015)
- Scorpiops asthenurus (Pocock, 1900)
- Scorpiops atomatus Qi, Zhu & Lourenço, 2005
- Scorpiops bahunetra Deshpande, Joshi, Ukale, Bastawade, Tang, Gowande, Monod & Sulakhe, 2025
- Scorpiops bastawadei Kovarik, Lowe, Stockmann & Stahlawsky, 2020
- Scorpiops beccaloniae (Kovarik, 2005)
- Scorpiops bhutanensis (Tikader & Bastawade, 1983)
- Scorpiops binghamii (Pocock, 1893)
- Scorpiops birulai Kovarik, Lowe, Stockmann & Stahlawsky, 2020
- Scorpiops braunwalderi Kovarik, 2000
- Scorpiops calmonti (Lourenço, 2013)
- Scorpiops cavernicola (Lourenço & Pham, 2013)
- Scorpiops chiangmai (Lourenço, 2019)
- Scorpiops ciki Kovarik, Lowe, Stockmann & Stahlawsky, 2020
- Scorpiops citadelle (Kovarik, 2013)
- Scorpiops dakrong (Lourenço & Pham, 2014)
- Scorpiops dastychi Kovarik, 2000
- Scorpiops deccanensis (Tikader & Bastawade, 1978)
- Scorpiops demisi Kovarik, 2005
- Scorpiops deshpandei Tang, Ouyang, Liu & Stahlavsky, 2024
- Scorpiops dii Kovarik, Lowe, Stockmann & Stahlawsky, 2020
- Scorpiops doiphukha Ythier, Kosulic, Nawanetiwong & Lourenco, 2025
- Scorpiops dunlopi Kovarik, Lowe, Stockmann & Stahlawsky, 2020
- Scorpiops farkaci Kovarik, 1993
- Scorpiops feti Kovarik, 2000
- Scorpiops furai Kovarik, 2020
- Scorpiops grandjeani (Vachon, 1974)
- Scorpiops grosseri Kovarik, 2020
- Scorpiops hardwickii (Gervais, 1843)
- Scorpiops harmsi Kovarik, 2020
- Scorpiops hofereki Kovarik, 2020
- Scorpiops ingens Yin, Zhang, Pan, Li & Di, 2015
- Scorpiops irenae Kovarik, 1994
- Scorpiops jendeki Kovarik, 1994
- Scorpiops kaftani (Kovarik, 1993)
- Scorpiops kamengensis (Bastawade, 2006)
- Scorpiops kautti Kovarik, Lowe, Stockmann & Stahlawsky, 2020
- Scorpiops kejvali Kovarik, 2020
- Scorpiops kovariki Tang, Ouyang, Liu & Stahlavsky, 2024
- Scorpiops krabiensis Kovarik, Lowe, Stockmann & Stahlawsky, 2020
- Scorpiops krachan Nawanetiwong, Kosulic, Warrit, Lourenço & Ythier, 2024
- Scorpiops kubani (Kovarik, 2004)
- Scorpiops langxian Qi, Zhu & Lourenço, 2005
- Scorpiops leptochirus Pocock, 1893
- Scorpiops lhasa Di & Zhu, 2009
- Scorpiops lii (Di & Qiao, 2020)
- Scorpiops lindbergi (Vachon, 1980)
- Scorpiops lioneli Sulakhe, Deshpande, Dandekar, Padhye & Bastawade, 2021
- Scorpiops longimanus (Pocock, 1893)
- Scorpiops lourencoi Lv & Di, 2022
- Scorpiops lowei Tang, 2022
- Scorpiops luridus Qi, Zhu & Lourenço, 2005
- Scorpiops maharashtraensis (Mirza, Sanap & Upadhye, 2014)
- Scorpiops margerisonae Kovarik, 2000
- Scorpiops matthewi Tang, Ouyang, Liu & Stahlavsky, 2024
- Scorpiops montanus (Karsch, 1879)
- Scorpiops nagphani Sulakhe, Deshpande, Dandekar, Padhye & Bastawade, 2021
- Scorpiops neera Sulakhe, Deshpande, Dandekar, Padhye & Bastawade, 2021
- Scorpiops neradi (Kovarik, Pliskova & Stahlavsky, 2013)
- Scorpiops novaki (Kovarik, 2005)
- Scorpiops oligotrichus Fage, 1933
- Scorpiops orioni (Kovarik, Košulič, Stahlavsky, Dongkhamfu & Wongprom 2015)
- Scorpiops pachmarhicus Bastawade, 1992
- Scorpiops pakistanus Kovarik & Ahmed, 2009
- Scorpiops pakseensis Kovarik, Lowe, Stockmann & Stahlawsky, 2020
- Scorpiops petersii Pocock, 1893
- Scorpiops phaltanensis (Sulakhe, Sayyed, Deshpande, Dandekar, Padhye & Bastawade, 2020)
- Scorpiops phatoensis Kovarik, Lowe, Stockmann & Stahlawsky, 2020
- Scorpiops piceus Lourenço & Ythier, 2022
- Scorpiops prasiti Kovarik, Lowe, Stockmann & Stahlawsky, 2020
- Scorpiops problematicus (Kovarik, 2000)
- Scorpiops profusus (Lourenço, 2017)
- Scorpiops pseudomontanus Kovarik & Ahmed, 2009
- Scorpiops puerensis (Di, Wu, Cao, Xiao & Li, 2010)
- Scorpiops reini Tang, 2024
- Scorpiops rohtangensis Mani, 1959
- Scorpiops rufus Lv & Di, 2023
- Scorpiops satarensis (Pocock, 1900)
- Scorpiops scheibeae Kovarik, Lowe, Stockmann & Stahlawsky, 2020
- Scorpiops schumacheri Kovarik, Lowe, Stockmann & Stahlawsky, 2020
- Scorpiops sejnai (Kovarik, 2000)
- Scorpiops sherwoodae Kovarik, Lowe, Stockmann & Stahlawsky, 2020
- Scorpiops shidian Qi, Zhu & Lourenço, 2005
- Scorpiops solegladi Kovarik, Lowe, Stockmann & Stahlawsky, 2020
- Scorpiops solidus Karsch, 1879
- Scorpiops songi Di & Qiao, 2020
- Scorpiops spitiensis Zambre, Sanap & Mirza, 2014
- Scorpiops tangae Kovarik, Stahlavsky & Stockmann 2024
- Scorpiops taxkorgan Lourenço, 2018
- Scorpiops telbaila Sulakhe, Deshpande, Dandekar, Ketkar, Padhye & Bastawade, 2020
- Scorpiops tenuicauda (Pocock, 1894)
- Scorpiops thailandus Kovarik, Lowe, Stockmann & Stahlawsky, 2020
- Scorpiops thaomischorum (Kovarik, 2012)
- Scorpiops tibetanus Hirst, 1911
- Scorpiops tongtongi Tang, 2022
- Scorpiops troglodytes (Lourenço & Pham, 2015)
- Scorpiops tryznai Kovarik, 2020
- Scorpiops validus (Di et al., 2010)
- Scorpiops vachoni (Qi, Zhu & Lourenço, 2005)
- Scorpiops viktoriae (Lourenço & Košulič, 2018)
- Scorpiops vrushchik Sulakhe, Deshpande, Dandekar, Padhye & Bastawade, 2021
- Scorpiops vonwicki Birula, 1913
- Scorpiops wongpromi (Kovarik, Soleglad & Košulič, 2013)
- Scorpiops wrzecionkoi Kovarik, 2020
- Scorpiops xui (Sun & Zhu, 2010)
- Scorpiops yagmuri Kovarik, 2020
- Scorpiops yangi (Zhu, Zhang & Lourenço, 2007)
- Scorpiops zhangshuyuani (Ythier, 2019)
- Scorpiops zhui Lv, Lourenço & Di, 2023
- Scorpiops zubairahmedi Kovarik, 2009
- Scorpiops zubairi Kovarik, 2020
