= Compsoscorpius =

Compsoscorpius Temporal range: 314.6–301.2 Ma

Scientific classification
- Kingdom: Animalia
- Phylum: Arthropoda
- Subphylum: Chelicerata
- Class: Arachnida
- Order: Scorpiones
- Family: †Palaeopisthacanthidae
- Genus: †Compsoscorpius; Petrunkevitch 1949

Species
- †Compsoscorpius buthiformis Pocock 1911; †Compsoscorpius elegans Petrunkevitch 1949

Synonyms
- Allobuthiscorpius Kjellesvig-Waering 1986; Coseleyscorpio Kjellesvig-Waering 1986; Leioscorpio Kjellesvig-Waering 1986; Lichnoscorpius Petrunkevitch 1949; Pseudobuthiscorpius Kjellesvig-Waering 1986

Extinct genus of scorpions

Compsoscorpius is an extinct genus of scorpions from the Carboniferous of France and the United Kingdom.
