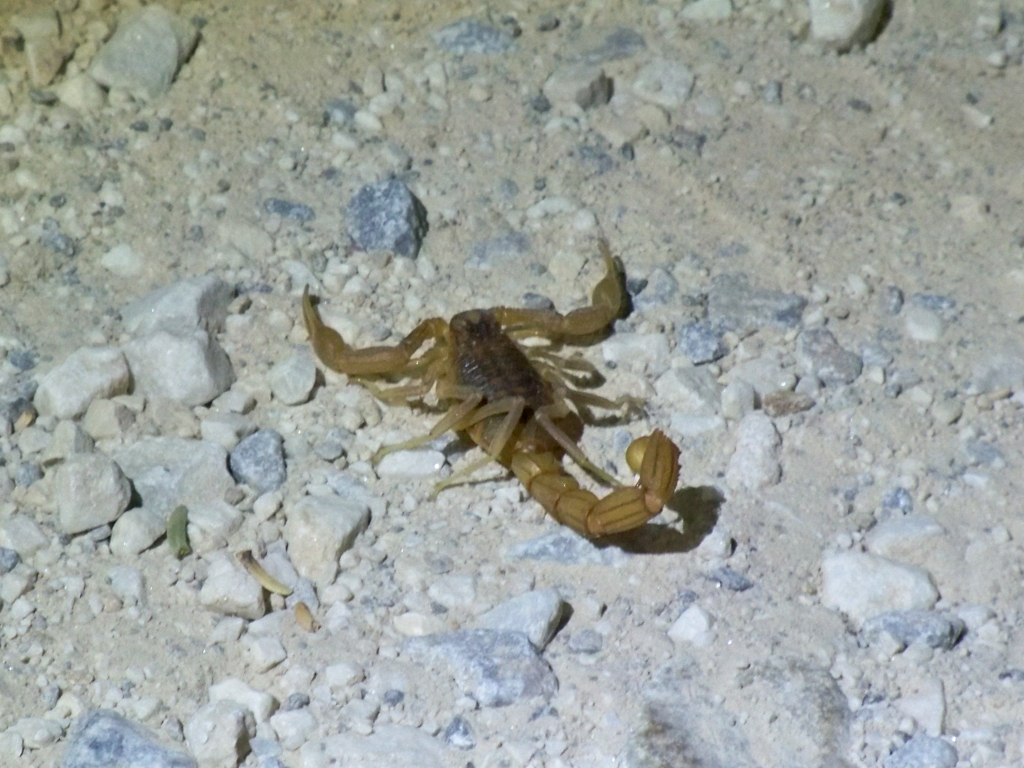
- Buthus elongatus scorpion in the Sierra de las Nieves National Park.

Scientific classification
- Kingdom: Animalia
- Phylum: Arthropoda
- Subphylum: Chelicerata
- Class: Arachnida
- Order: Scorpiones
- Family: Buthidae
- Genus: Buthus
- Species: B. elongatus

Binomial name
- Buthus elongatus Rossi, 2012

= Buthus elongatus =

Species of scorpion

Buthus elongatus is a scorpion species of the family Buthidae, found in southern Spain.

== Distribution ==
It is endemic to the province of Málaga and possibly to the province of Cádiz in Spain.
