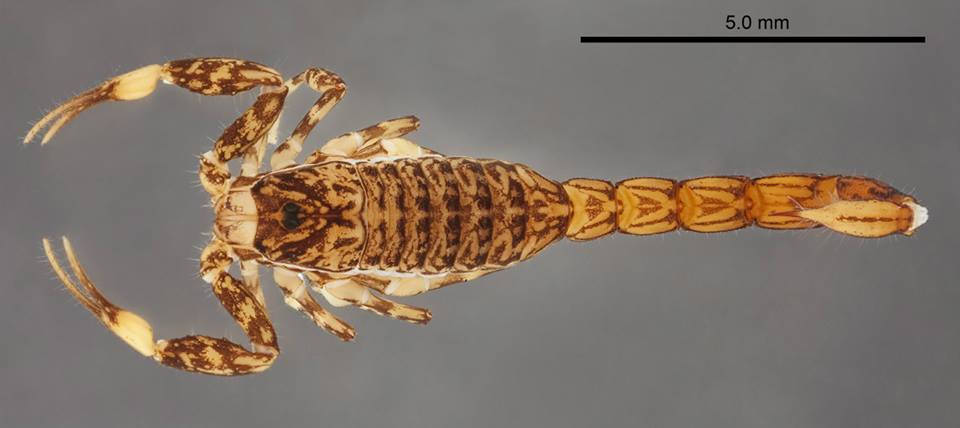
- Microcharmus cloudsleythompsoni

Scientific classification
- Kingdom: Animalia
- Phylum: Arthropoda
- Subphylum: Chelicerata
- Class: Arachnida
- Order: Scorpiones
- Family: Buthidae
- Genus: Microcharmus; Lourenço, 1995

Synonyms
- Ankaranocharmus Lourenço, 2004

= Microcharmus =

Genus of scorpions

Microcharmus is a genus of scorpions in the family Buthidae. The species are endemic to Madagascar.

== List of species ==
The following species are recognised in the genus Microcharmus:

- Microcharmus andrei Lourenço, Waeber & Wilme, 2019
- Microcharmus antongil Lourenço, Waeber & Wilme, 2019
- Microcharmus bemaraha Lourenço, Goodman & Fisher, 2006
- Microcharmus cloudsleythompsoni Lourenço, 1995
- Microcharmus confluenciatus Lourenço, Goodman & Fisher, 2006
- Microcharmus djangoa Lourenço, Waeber & Wilme, 2019
- Microcharmus duhemi Lourenço, Goodman & Fisher, 2006
- Microcharmus fisheri Lourenço, 1998
- Microcharmus hauseri Lourenço, 1996
- Microcharmus jussarae Lourenço, 1996
- Microcharmus maculatus Lourenço, Goodman & Fisher, 2006
- Microcharmus madagascariensis Lourenço, 1999
- Microcharmus pauliani (Lourenço, 2004)
- Microcharmus sabineae Lourenço, 1996
- Microcharmus variegatus Lourenço, Goodman & Fisher, 2006
- Microcharmus violaceous Lourenço, Goodman & Fisher, 2006
