= BotIT2 =

BotIT2 is a neurotoxin from the scorpion Buthus occitanus tunetanus, which modifies activation and slows down the deactivation of voltage gated sodium channels.

== Source and etymology ==
BotIT2 is found in the venom of the scorpion Buthus occitanus tunetanus (Bot) and hence named Buthus occitanus tunetanus insect toxin 2 (BotIT2).

== Chemistry ==
=== Structure ===
N'—DGYIKGYKGCKITCVINDDYCDTECKAEGGTYGICWKWGLACWCEDLPEDKRWKPETNTC –C'
Fig.1 Amino acid sequence of BotIT2 including N-terminus and C-terminus.

The BotIT2 peptide is composed of 60 amino-acids (Fig. 1) and its C-terminal residue contains a free carboxyl group. The molecular mass of BotIT2 is 6919 Da.

=== Family ===
BotIT2 belongs to the Buthidae neurotoxin family. Three main groups are distinguishable in this family: the α-, the β- and the depressant toxins. The BotIT2 has characteristics of all these subgroups. However, BotIT2 is classified as a β-depressant toxin.

=== Homology ===
BotIT2 differs from other scorpion toxins not only in its amino acid sequence, but in its effects on activation kinetics of insect sodium channels as well. Similarities are found between BotIT2 and other neurotoxins. For example, the degree of similarity with the α-type and β-type toxins, flaccid-depressive insect toxins and BotIT4 is 30-40%, 60-70%, and 67%, respectively. Despite 67% homogeneity with BotIT4, BotIT4 can be discriminated from BotIT2, by binding two sodium channel sites and having its exclusive depressant electrophysiological function. However, BotIT4 and BotIT2 do share binding characteristics.

== Target ==
BotIT2 binds site 4 of voltage gated sodium channels with low capacity (Bmax = 2.4 ± 0.5 pmol/mg) and high affinity (Kd = 0.3 ± 0.1 nM). Besides its influence in insects, BotIT2 affects neuronal membrane properties of mammals as well, but in a less potent way (see Toxicity).

== Mode of action ==
The effect of BotIT2 was investigated in the giant axon and dorsal unpaired median (DUM) neurons of the American cockroach (Periplaneta americana), to examine its influence on neuronal excitability by means of voltage clamp and current clamp recordings. Application of BotIT2 transforms the fast sodium current into a slow sodium current. The difference in gating modes from fast to slow are caused by changes in structural conformation. The voltage dependence of this slow current does not differ from the dependence of the fast current. However, the kinetics (activation and deactivation) of the current are slowed down by 40-300 times. This slow sodium current induces a depolarization and results in repetitive firing pattern and burst firing in a time-dependent manner. BotIT2 decreases the maximal peak of the fast depolarizing sodium inward current and thus causes a decrease in action potential amplitude.
Together, BotIT2 modifies the kinetics of insect's sodium channel activation, transforms fast sodium currents in slow current and enhances (in DUM) or induces (in the axon) a repetitive firing pattern or burst activity, but of smaller amplitude.

== Toxicity ==
Table 1. Whole charge and toxicity (LD_{50}) of Bot insect toxins in B. Germanica.
Insect toxin	Whole charge	Toxicity (ng/100 mg body weight)
BotIT6	+3	10
BotIT4/IT5	-2	110
BotIT3	-3	135

BotIT2 is highly toxic in insects. For instance, injection of BotIT2 into the German cockroach (Blatella germanica) results in a contraction paralysis effect. Although the toxin induces neurotoxic symptoms in mice too, it is less potent in mammals than in insects (LD_{50} in mice = 1 μg/20 g; LD_{50} in B. Germanica = 135 ng/100 mg).

So far, the underlying mechanism of the toxic behavior has not been fully understood. The high toxicity of the toxins in animals could be explained by the presence of different toxins in the venom of Buthus occitanus tunetanus (BotIT1, BotIT4 and BotIT5) which acts collectively to insects. Another possibility might be a cooperative interaction between the toxins in the venom. In general, scorpion toxins bind to ion channels via sites of positive surface potential. The total positive charge of the toxin increases its toxicity. Table 1 indicates whole charge for some Bot insect toxins and their toxicity. BotIT2 its whole charge is negative (-3), like BotIT4/5 (-2), whereas it is positive for BotIT6 (+3). Therefore, BotIT2 is the least potent (LD_{50} = 135 ng/100 mg) when compared to BotIT4, BotIT5 and BotIT64.
