= Chaerilus tessellatus =

Scientific classification
- Domain: Eukaryota
- Kingdom: Animalia
- Phylum: Arthropoda
- Subphylum: Chelicerata
- Class: Arachnida
- Order: Scorpiones
- Family: Chaerilidae
- Genus: Chaerilus
- Species: C. tessellatus

Binomial name
- Chaerilus tessellatus Qi, Zhu & Lourenço, 2005

Species of scorpion

Chaerilus tessellatus is a species of scorpion in the Chaerilidae family, first found in Tibet and Yunnan, China.
