= Palaeopisthacanthidae =

Palaeopisthacanthidae Temporal range: 311.45–303.7 Ma

Scientific classification
- Kingdom: Animalia
- Phylum: Arthropoda
- Subphylum: Chelicerata
- Class: Arachnida
- Order: Scorpiones
- Family: †Palaeopisthacanthidae; Kjellesvig-Waering, 1986

Genera
- †Compsoscorpius Petrunkevitch 1949; †Cryptoscorpius Jeram 1994; †Palaeopisthacanthus Petrunkevitch 1913

Extinct family of scorpions

Palaeopisthacanthidae is an extinct family of scorpions.

== See also ==
- Taxonomy of scorpions
