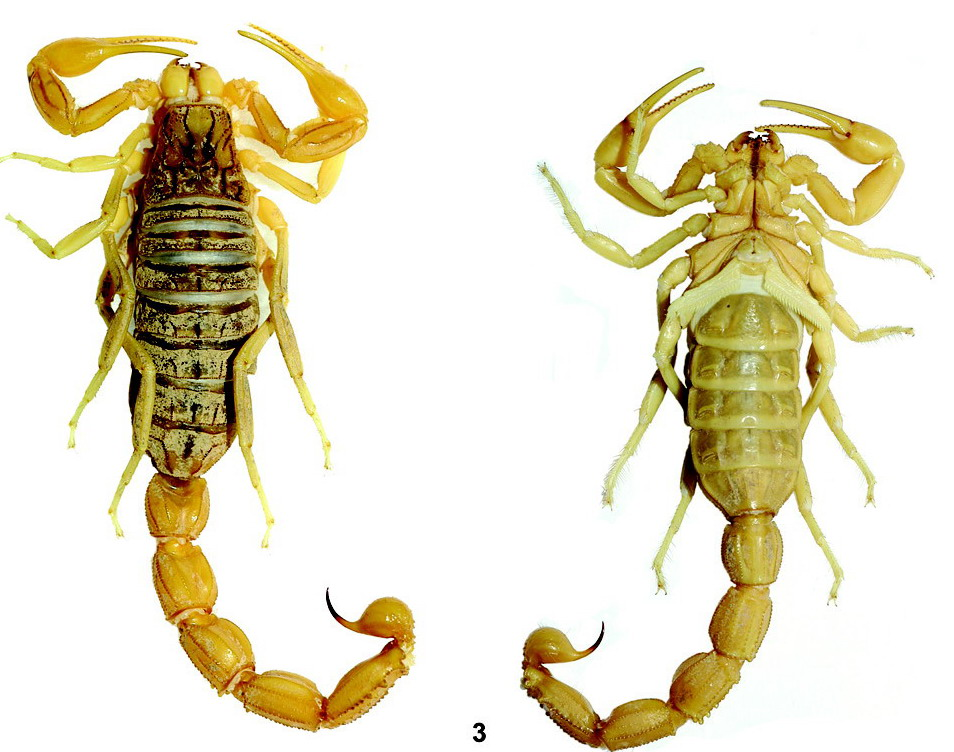
- Buthus kunti

Scientific classification
- Kingdom: Animalia
- Phylum: Arthropoda
- Subphylum: Chelicerata
- Class: Arachnida
- Order: Scorpiones
- Family: Buthidae
- Genus: Buthus
- Species: B. kunti

Binomial name
- Buthus kunti Yağmur, Koç & Lourenço, 2011

= Buthus kunti =

Species of scorpion

Buthus kunti is a scorpion species endemic to Cyprus. It was described as a new species in 2011 and is one of two scorpions endemic to the island. It is named after Kadir Boğaç Kunt. It is a medium to large scorpion that can reach lengths of up to 73 mm. It is mostly yellow to pale yellow with brownish spots on the central ridges of the carapace. The legs have scattered brown spots. The scorpion is known from the Karpas Peninsula and Güzelyurt District, where they inhabit habitats with sandy soil.

== Taxonomy ==
Buthus scorpions were first documented from Cyprus in 1891. In the late 19th century, Eugène Simon collected a female specimen of a scorpion from Cyprus and called it "Buthus orientalis"; however, he never published this name. Buthus kunti was described as a new species in 2011 on the basis of several specimens collected in that year. Although the specimen collected by Simon may be an individual of Buthus kunti, it was not used as a type specimen by the authors describing the species as it was poorly preserved and collected from an unknown locality. The species is named after Kadir Boğaç Kunt, the founder of the Turkish Arachnological Society.

== Description ==
Buthus kunti is a medium to large scorpion that can reach lengths of up to 73 mm. It is mostly yellow to pale yellow with brownish spots on the carinae (central ridges) of the carapace. The legs have scattered brown spots. The carinae are fairly to strongly marked, while the granulations are more weakly marked. The fingers have 12 rows of granules. The pectines have 24 to 25 teeth in female and 27 to 29 teeth in males.

== Distribution ==
Buthus kunti is endemic to Cyprus, where it has been recorded from the Karpas Peninsula and Güzelyurt District. Specimens collected from the Zafer headland on the Karpas Peninsula inhabited sandy soils with plants such as Pancratium maritimum, Cakile maritima, Limonium albidum and Pistacia lentiscus. In Güzelyurt, scorpions were found in steppe vegetation with bushes. B. kunti appears to niche partition with the only other scorpion endemic to Cyprus, Aegaeobuthus cyprius, with B. kunti exclusively inhabiting habitats with sandy soil.
