= Troglotayosicus =

Scientific classification
- Kingdom: Animalia
- Phylum: Arthropoda
- Subphylum: Chelicerata
- Class: Arachnida
- Order: Scorpiones
- Superfamily: Chactoidea
- Family: Troglotayosicidae; Lourenço, 1998
- Genus: Troglotayosicus; Lourenço, 1981

Family of scorpions

Troglotayosicidae is a family of scorpions. The only genus in the family is Troglotayosicus.

== Species ==
Species accepted by the Global Biodiversity Information Facility as of 2024:

- Troglotayosicus ballvei Botero-Trujillo, Ochoa & Prendini, 2021
- Troglotayosicus hirsutus Botero-Trujillo, Ochoa, Tovar & Souza, 2012
- Troglotayosicus humiculum Botero-Trujillo & Francke, 2009
- Troglotayosicus meijdeni Botero-Trujillo, Gonzalez-Gomez, Valenzuela-Rojas & Garcia, 2017
- Troglotayosicus muranunkae Sanchez-Vialas, Blasco-Arostegui, Garcia-Gila & Lourenco, 2020
- Troglotayosicus vachoni Lourenço, 1981
