= Hottentotta caboverdensis =

Scientific classification
- Kingdom: Animalia
- Phylum: Arthropoda
- Subphylum: Chelicerata
- Class: Arachnida
- Order: Scorpiones
- Family: Buthidae
- Genus: Hottentotta
- Species: H. caboverdensis

Binomial name
- Hottentotta caboverdensis Lourenço & Ythier, 2006

Species of scorpion

Hottentotta caboverdensis is a species of scorpions of the family Buthidae. The species was described by Wilson R. Lourenço and Eric Ythier in 2006. The specific name caboverdensis refers to Cape Verde, where the new species was found.

Initially classified as a distinct species, Hottentotta caboverdensis has been later synonymized with Hottentotta hottentotta, indicating that it may not be a separate species as originally thought.

== Description ==
The females reach 62 mm length. The colour is reddish-brown to dark brown.

== Distribution ==
The species is endemic to Cape Verde, where it occurs on the island of Santiago. It is considered the only native species of scorpions in the archipelago and is on the list of capeverdean protected animal species (decreto-lei no.8/2022).
