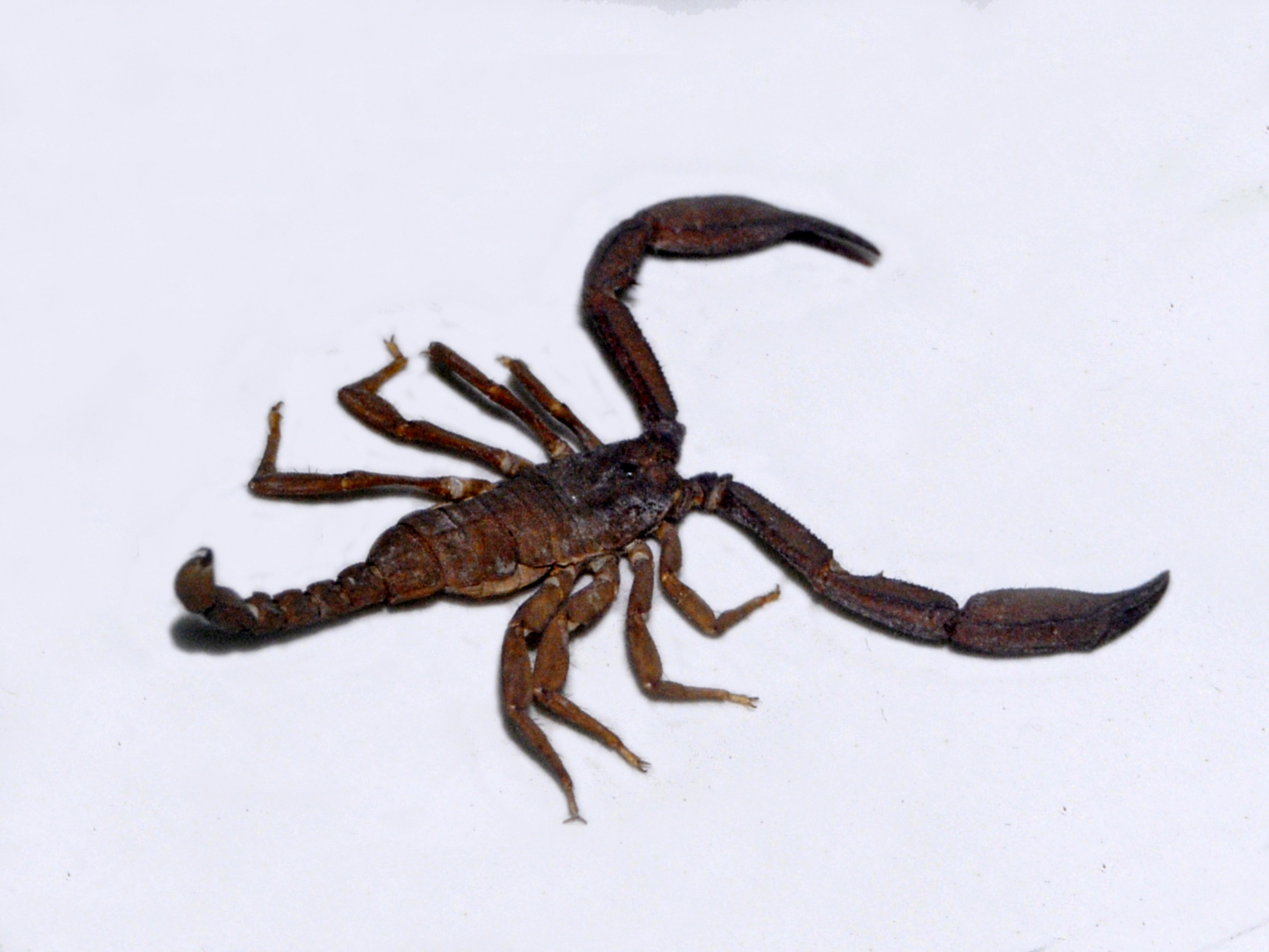
- Museum specimen of Euscorpiops montanus

Scientific classification
- Kingdom: Animalia
- Phylum: Arthropoda
- Subphylum: Chelicerata
- Class: Arachnida
- Order: Scorpiones
- Family: Scorpiopidae
- Tribe: Scorpiopini
- Genus: Euscorpiops; Vachon, 1980

= Euscorpiops =

Genus of scorpions

Euscorpiops is a genus of scorpion in the family Euscorpiidae.

== Species ==
- Euscorpiops asthenurus (Pocock, 1900)
- Euscorpiops bhutanensis (Tikader & Bastawade, 1983)
- Euscorpiops binghamii (Pocock, 1893)
- Euscorpiops kaftani (Kovarik, 1993)
- Euscorpiops karschi Qi, Zhu & Lourenço, 2005
- Euscorpiops kubani Kovarik, 2004
- Euscorpiops longimanus (Pocock, 1893)
- Euscorpiops montanus (Karsch, 1879)
- Euscorpiops shidian Qi, Zhu & Lourenço, 2005
- Euscorpiops vachoni Qi, Zhu & Lourenço, 2005
