= Chaerilus philippinus =

Scientific classification
- Domain: Eukaryota
- Kingdom: Animalia
- Phylum: Arthropoda
- Subphylum: Chelicerata
- Class: Arachnida
- Order: Scorpiones
- Family: Chaerilidae
- Genus: Chaerilus
- Species: C. philippinus

Binomial name
- Chaerilus philippinus Lourenço & Ythier, 2008

Species of scorpion

Chaerilus philippinus is a species of scorpion native to the Philippines.

== Description ==
Adult C. philippinus range from 15 mm to 19 mm in total length. Scorpions of this species may be reddish-yellow to reddish-brown in color.
