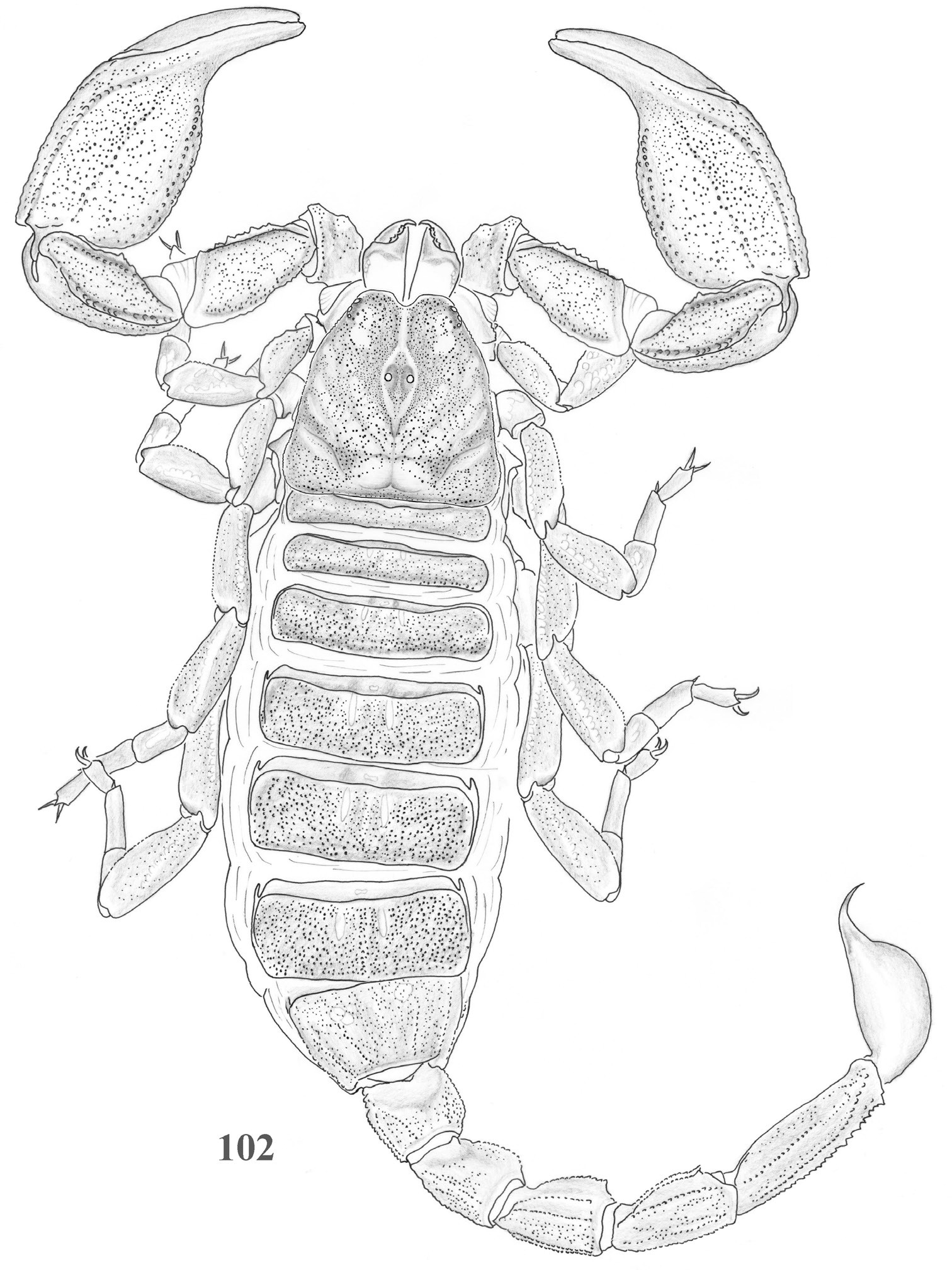
- Scorpiops tibetanus, female

Scientific classification
- Kingdom: Animalia
- Phylum: Arthropoda
- Subphylum: Chelicerata
- Class: Arachnida
- Order: Scorpiones
- Family: Scorpiopidae
- Genus: Scorpiops
- Species: S. tibetanus

Binomial name
- Scorpiops tibetanus Hirst, 1911

= Scorpiops tibetanus =

Species of scorpion

Scorpiops tibetanus is a species of scorpion in the Scorpiopidae family, first found in Tibet, China.
