= Pierre-Joseph Amoreux =

French physician and naturalist (1741–1824)

Pierre-Joseph Amoreux (1741, Beaucaire – 1824, Montpellier) was a French medical doctor and naturalist. He was the son of Guillaume Amoreux, also a physician and an inventor of surgical devices. He was the librarian at the Faculté de Médecine de Montpellier, in English Medical college of Montpellier. He was the author of many works on medicine, agriculture, botany and natural history. The most important are:

- Traité de l'olivier (Veuve Gontier, Montpellier, 1784)
- Recherches sur la vie et les ouvrages de Pierre Richer de Belleval, fondateur du jardin botanique, donné par Henri IV à la Faculté de médecine de Montpellier, en 1593, pour servir à l'histoire de cette Faculté et à celle de la botanique (J.-A. Joly, Avignon, 1786).
- Mémoire sur les haies destinées à la clôture des prés, des champs, des vignes et des jeunes bois (Cuchet, Paris, 1787, réédité en 1809)
- Notice des insectes de la France réputés venimeux (rue et hôtel Serpente, Paris, 1789).
- Mémoire sur la nécessité et les moyens d'améliorer l'agriculture dans le district de Montpellier (Imprimerie révolutionnaire de Bonnariq & Avignon, Montpellier, an II, 1794).
- Essai historique et littéraire sur la médecine des Arabes (A. Ricard, Montpellier, 1805).
- Mémoire sur le bornage ou la limitation des possessions rurales (imprimerie de A. Ricard, Montpellier, 1809).
- Dissertation historique et critique sur l'origine du cachou (Renaud, Montpellier, 1812).
- Notice historique et bibliographique sur la vie et les ouvrages de Laurent Joubert, chancelier en l'Université de médecine de Montpellier, au XVIe siècle (imprimerie de Tournel, Montpellier, 1814, réédité en 1971 chez Slatkine, Genève).
- Dissertation philologique sur les plantes religieuses (Durville, Montpellier, 1817).
- Revue de l'histoire de la licorne, par un naturaliste de Montpellier (Durville, Montpellier, 1818).
- La Guirlande de Julie, expliquée par de nouvelles annotations sur les madrigaux et sur les fleurs peintes qui la composent (Gabon, Paris, 1824).
