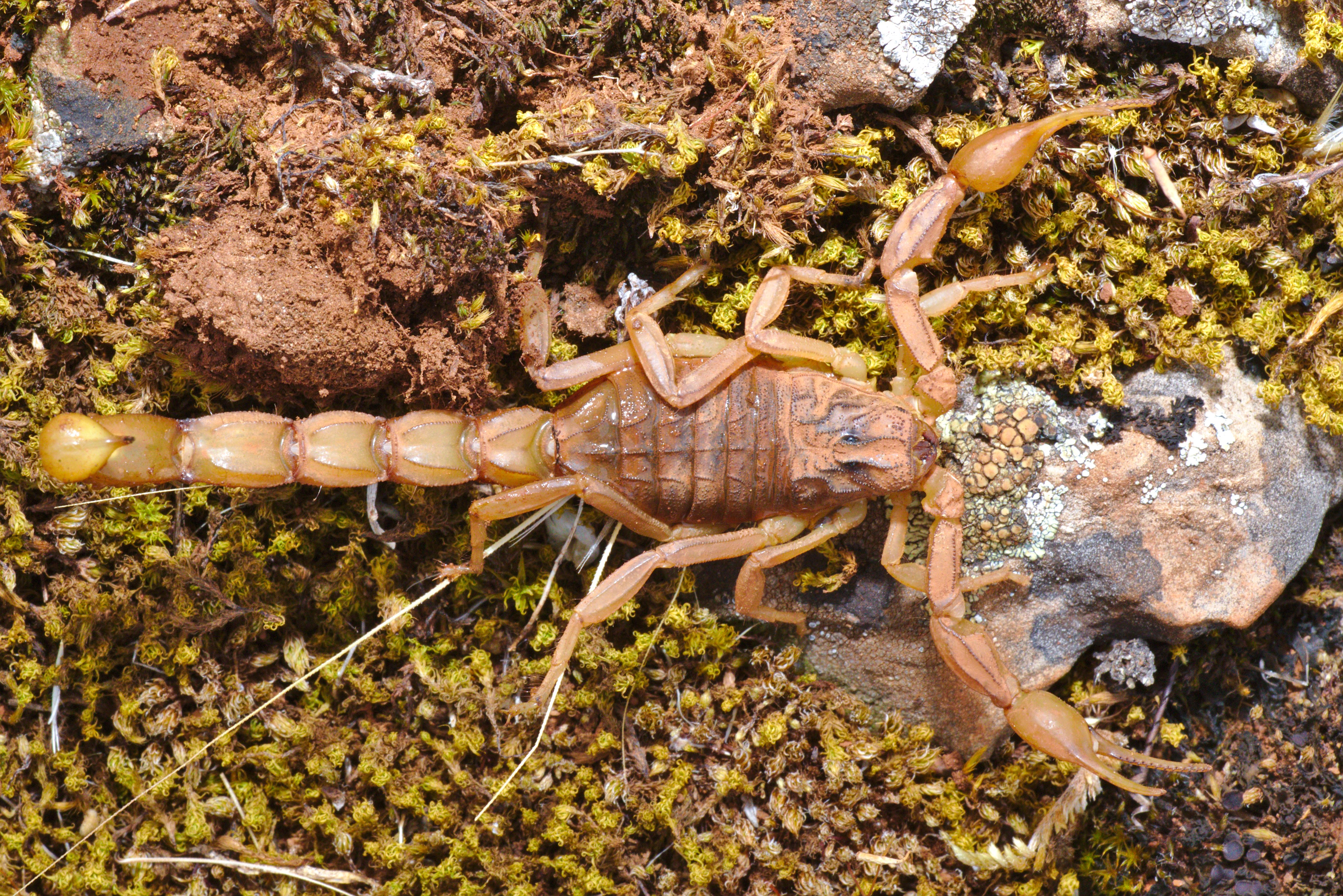

Scientific classification
- Kingdom: Animalia
- Phylum: Arthropoda
- Subphylum: Chelicerata
- Class: Arachnida
- Order: Scorpiones
- Family: Buthidae
- Genus: Buthus
- Species: B. ibericus

Binomial name
- Buthus ibericus Lourenço & Vachon, 2004

= Buthus ibericus =

Species of scorpion

Buthus ibericus is a scorpion species found in western Spain and Portugal.
