= Euscorpiops karschi =

Scientific classification
- Kingdom: Animalia
- Phylum: Arthropoda
- Subphylum: Chelicerata
- Class: Arachnida
- Order: Scorpiones
- Family: Scorpiopidae
- Genus: Euscorpiops
- Species: E. karschi

Binomial name
- Euscorpiops karschi Qi, Zhu & Lourenço, 2005

Species of scorpion

Euscorpiops karschi is a species of scorpion in the Euscorpiidae family, first found in Tibet and Yunnan, China.

According to a 2014 publication, the scorpion has a chela, or pincer-like claw, with a "length to width ratio of 3.4 – 3.5, carapace with sparse, nearly equal granules, total length less than 50 mm (small species), [and] coloration basically dark red-brown."
