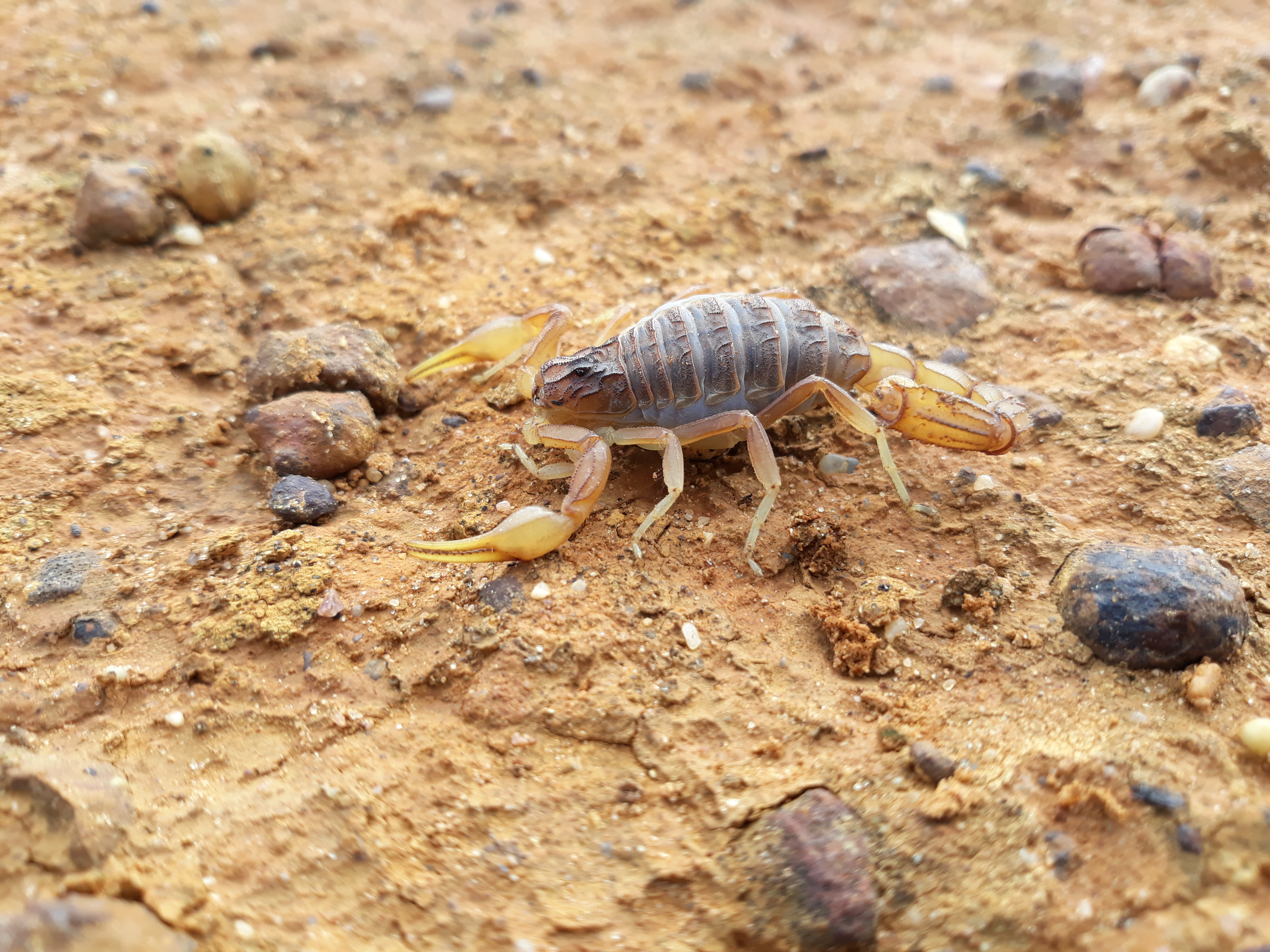
- B.occitanus in the Algarve, Portugal

Scientific classification
- Kingdom: Animalia
- Phylum: Arthropoda
- Subphylum: Chelicerata
- Class: Arachnida
- Order: Scorpiones
- Family: Buthidae
- Genus: Buthus
- Species: B. occitanus

Binomial name
- Buthus occitanus Amoreux, 1789

= Buthus occitanus =

Species of arachnid

Buthus occitanus, the common yellow scorpion, is a species of scorpion in the family Buthidae. It occurs in the Middle East, North Africa and Southern Europe in the areas of Portugal, Spain and France which have a Mediterranean climate.

B. occitanus is 60–80 mm in length, has a yellow or yellow-brown color and is venomous producing BotIT6 toxin, but its toxicity varies markedly across its range. This scorpion is often found in dry and hot areas with sparse vegetation, where it hides under stones etc. during daytime. It has also been reported from Mediterranean forests in Spain at altitudes above 1000 meters (with snowfall in the winter). The sting in Europe is painful but has only mild toxic effects. However, in North Africa (where subspecies Buthus occitanus tunetanus lives) it may be fatal.

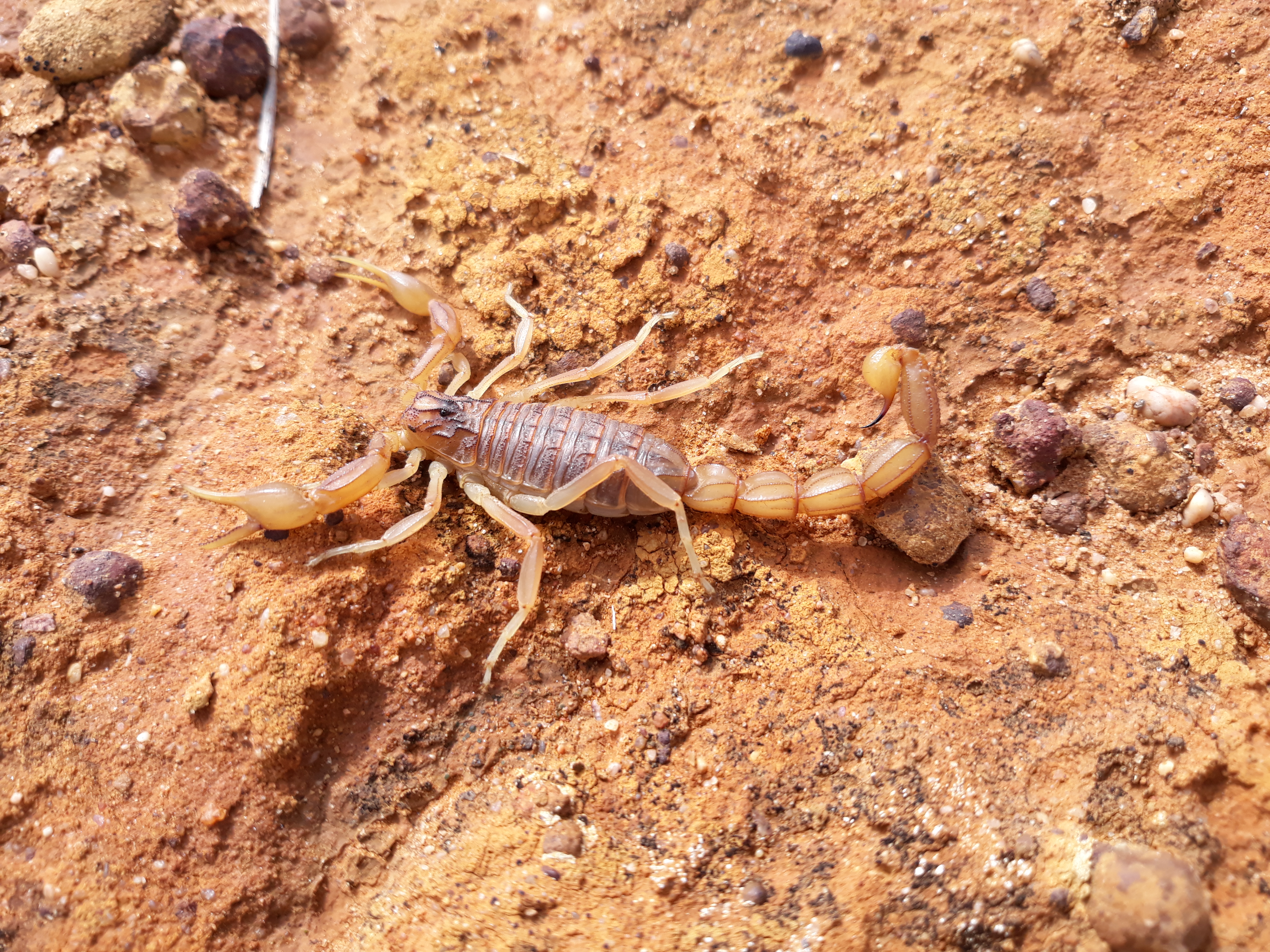
B.occitanus in the Algarve, Portugal
