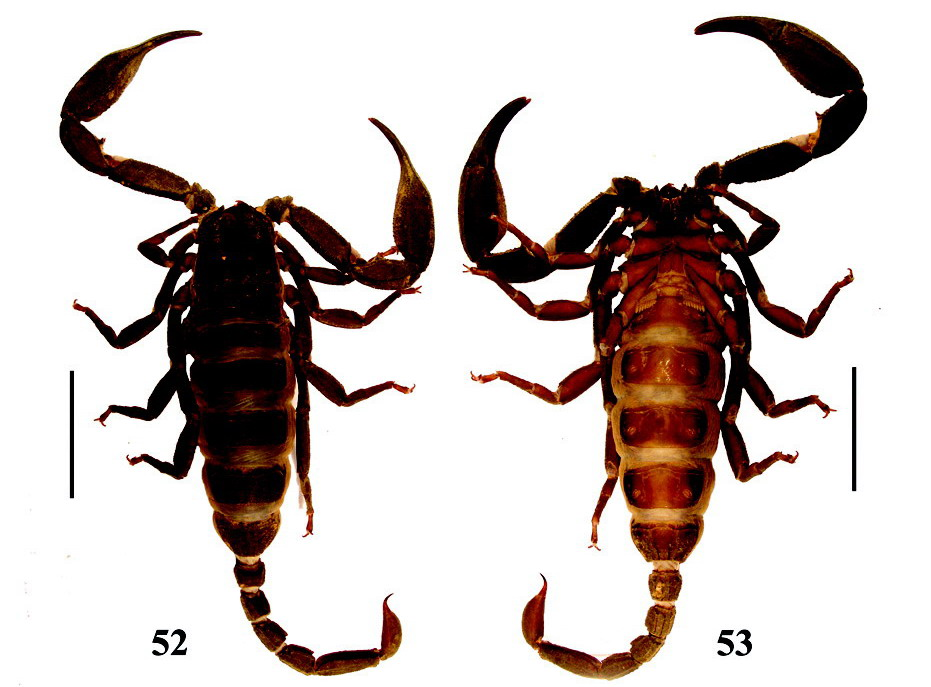
- female

Scientific classification
- Kingdom: Animalia
- Phylum: Arthropoda
- Subphylum: Chelicerata
- Class: Arachnida
- Order: Scorpiones
- Family: Scorpiopidae
- Genus: Euscorpiops
- Species: E. shidian

Binomial name
- Euscorpiops shidian Qi, Zhu & Lourenço, 2005

= Euscorpiops shidian =

Species of scorpion

Euscorpiops shidian is a species of scorpion in the Euscorpiidae family, first found in Tibet and Yunnan, China.
