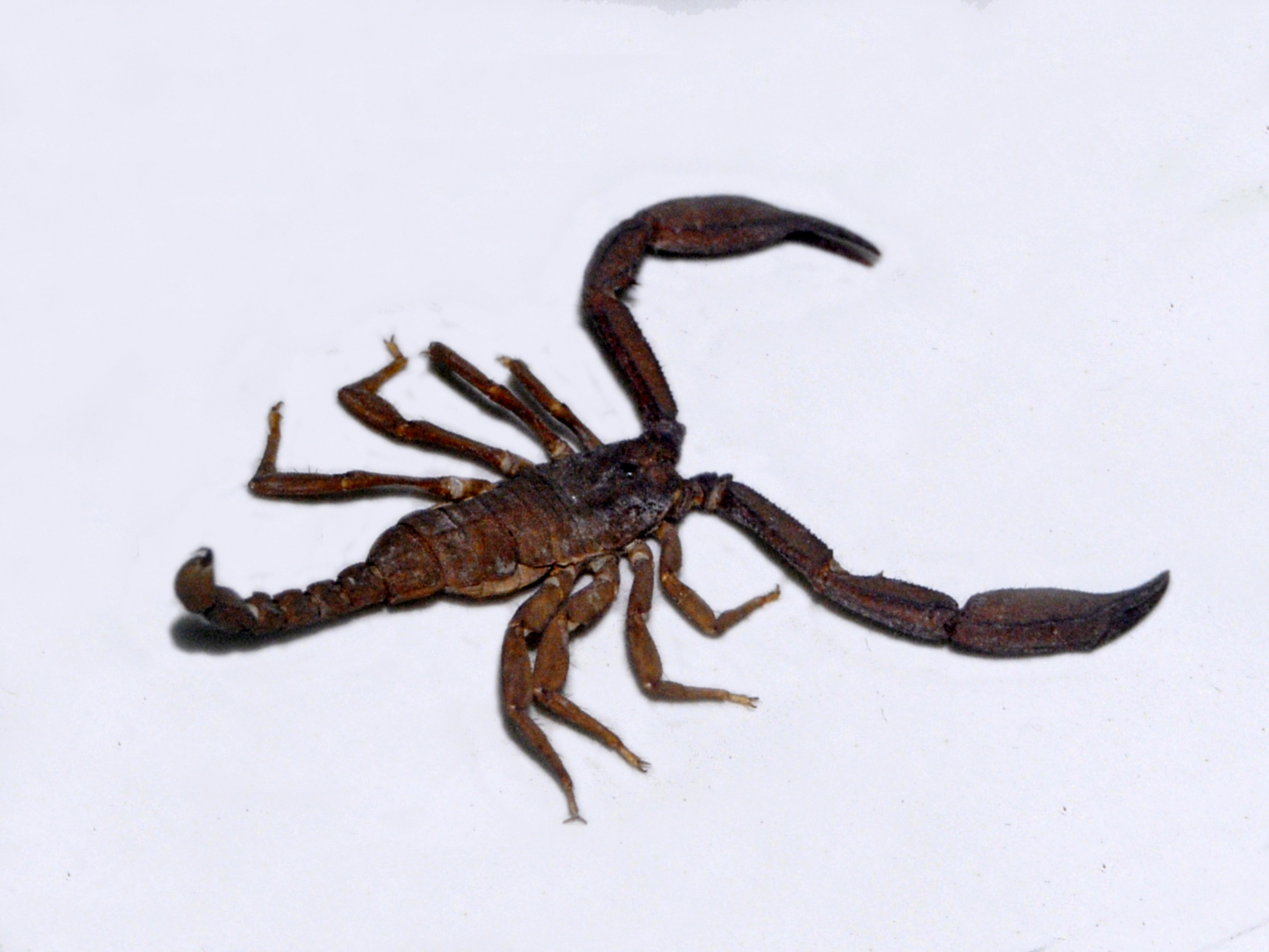
- Museum specimen of Euscorpiops montanus

Scientific classification
- Domain: Eukaryota
- Kingdom: Animalia
- Phylum: Arthropoda
- Subphylum: Chelicerata
- Class: Arachnida
- Order: Scorpiones
- Family: Scorpiopidae
- Genus: Euscorpiops
- Species: E. montanus

Binomial name
- Euscorpiops montanus Karsch, 1879

Synonyms
- Euscorpiops montanus Karsch, 1879

= Euscorpiops montanus =

Species of scorpion

Euscorpiops montanus, is a species of scorpion native to Bhutan, India and Pakistan.
