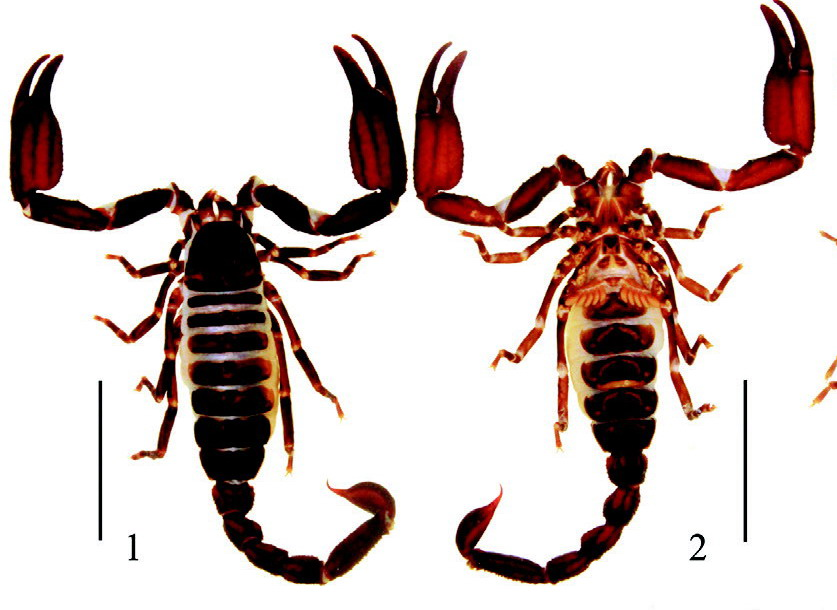
- Chaerilus pseudoconchiformus

Scientific classification
- Kingdom: Animalia
- Phylum: Arthropoda
- Subphylum: Chelicerata
- Class: Arachnida
- Order: Scorpiones
- Family: Chaerilidae
- Genus: Chaerilus; Simon, 1877

Type species
- Chaerilus variegatus Simon, 1877

Diversity
- 59 species

Synonyms
- Chaerilus Simon, 1877; Chelomachus Thorell, 1889; Uromachus Pocock, 1890

= Chaerilus =

Chaerilus Temporal range: Cretaceous–present

Genus of scorpions

Chaerilus is a genus of scorpions in the family Chaerilidae. They live in tropical parts of South Asia and Southeast Asia. A fossil genus Electrochaerilus is known from the Late Cretaceous (Cenomanian) aged Burmese amber.

== Description ==
Total length is 15 to 75.4 mm.

== Species ==
It contains the following species:

- Chaerilus adrianoi Lourenço & Ythier, 2024
- Chaerilus agilis Pocock, 1899
- Chaerilus agnellivanniorum Lourenço & Rossi, 2018
- Chaerilus alberti Kovařík, 2019
- Chaerilus andamanensis Lourenço, Duhem & Leguin, 2011
- Chaerilus annapurna Lourenço & Duhem, 2010
- Chaerilus anneae Lourenço, 2012
- Chaerilus assamensis Kraepelin, 1913
- Chaerilus birmanicus Thorell, 1889
- Chaerilus borneensis Simon, 1880
- Chaerilus cavernicola Pocock, 1894
- Chaerilus celebensis Pocock, 1894
- Chaerilus ceylonensis Pocock, 1894
- Chaerilus chapmani Vachon & Lourenço, 1985
- Chaerilus chubluk Lourenço, Tran & Pham, 2020
- Chaerilus cimrmani Kovařík, 2012
- Chaerilus conchiformus Zhu, Han & Lourenço, 2008
- Chaerilus granulatus Kovařík, Lowe, Hoferek, Forman & Král, 2015
- Chaerilus herta Tang, 2025
- Chaerilus hofereki Kovarik, Kral, Korinkova & Lerma, 2014
- Chaerilus insignis Pocock, 1894
- Chaerilus julietteae Lourenço, 2011
- Chaerilus kampuchea Lourenço, 2012
- Chaerilus kautti Kovařík, Lowe, Stockmann & Stahlavsky, 2020
- Chaerilus laevimanus Pocock, 1899
- Chaerilus laoticus Lourenço & Zhu, 2008
- Chaerilus lehtrarensis Khatoon, 1999
- Chaerilus longimanus Kovařík, Lowe, Hoferek, Forman & Král, 2015
- Chaerilus mainlingensis Di & Zhu, 2009
- Chaerilus majkusi Kovařík, Lowe & Stahlavsky, 2018
- Chaerilus neradorum Kovařík, Lowe & Stahlavsky, 2018
- Chaerilus ojangureni Kovařík, 2005
- Chaerilus pakistanus Ythier & Lourenço, 2025
- Chaerilus pathom Lourenço & Pham, 2014
- Chaerilus petrzelkai Kovařík, 2000
- Chaerilus philippinus Lourenço & Ythier, 2008
- Chaerilus pictus (Pocock, 1890)
- Chaerilus pseudoconchiformus Yin, Qiu, Pan, Li & Di, 2015
- Chaerilus pulcherrimus Kovařík, Lowe, Stockmann & Stahlavsky, 2020
- Chaerilus rectimanus Pocock, 1899
- Chaerilus robinsoni Hirst, 1911
- Chaerilus sabinae Lourenço, 1995
- Chaerilus seiteri Kovařík, 2012
- Chaerilus sejnai Kovařík, 2005
- Chaerilus solegladi Kovařík, 2012
- Chaerilus spinatus Lourenço & Duhem, 2010
- Chaerilus stockmannorum Kovařík, Lowe & Stahlavsky, 2018
- Chaerilus telnovi Lourenço, 2009
- Chaerilus terueli Kovařík, 2012
- Chaerilus tessellatus Qi, Zhu & Lourenço, 2005
- Chaerilus thai Lourenço, Sun & Zhu, 2010
- Chaerilus tichyi Kovařík, 2000
- Chaerilus tricostatus Pocock, 1899
- Chaerilus truncatus Karsch, 1879
- Chaerilus tryznai Kovařík, 2000
- Chaerilus variegatus Simon, 1877
- Chaerilus vietnamicus Lourenço & Zhu, 2008
- Chaerilus wrzecionkoi Kovařík, 2012

== See also ==
- Ctri9577
