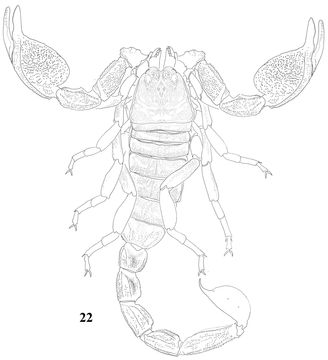
- Scorpiops langxian sketch

Scientific classification
- Kingdom: Animalia
- Phylum: Arthropoda
- Subphylum: Chelicerata
- Class: Arachnida
- Order: Scorpiones
- Family: Scorpiopidae
- Genus: Scorpiops
- Species: S. langxian

Binomial name
- Scorpiops langxian Qi, Zhu & Lourenço, 2005

= Scorpiops langxian =

Species of scorpion

Scorpiops langxian is a species of scorpion in the family Euscorpiidae, first found in Tibet, China.
