= Buthus montanus =

Scientific classification
- Kingdom: Animalia
- Phylum: Arthropoda
- Subphylum: Chelicerata
- Class: Arachnida
- Order: Scorpiones
- Family: Buthidae
- Genus: Buthus
- Species: B. montanus

Binomial name
- Buthus montanus Lourenço & Vachon, 2004

Species of scorpion

Buthus montanus is a scorpion species found in the mountain ranges of southeastern Spain.
