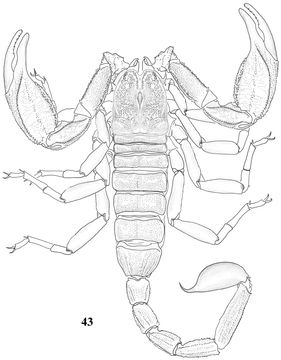
- Scorpiops luridus sketch

Scientific classification
- Kingdom: Animalia
- Phylum: Arthropoda
- Subphylum: Chelicerata
- Class: Arachnida
- Order: Scorpiones
- Family: Scorpiopidae
- Genus: Scorpiops
- Species: S. luridus

Binomial name
- Scorpiops luridus Qi, Zhu & Lourenço, 2005

= Scorpiops luridus =

Species of scorpion

Scorpiops luridus is a species of scorpion in the Euscorpiidae family, first found in Tibet and Yunnan, China.
