= Chaerilidae =

Chaerilidae Temporal range: Cenomanian–present

Scientific classification
- Kingdom: Animalia
- Phylum: Arthropoda
- Subphylum: Chelicerata
- Class: Arachnida
- Order: Scorpiones
- Parvorder: Chaerilida; Soleglad and Fet, 2003
- Superfamily: Chaeriloidea; Pocock, 1893
- Family: Chaerilidae; Pocock, 1893

Genera
- Chaerilus; †Electrochaerilus

Family of scorpions

Chaerilidae is a family of scorpions. It contains two genera, the extant Chaerilus (Simon, 1877) and the extinct Electrochaerilus (Santiago-Blay, Fet, Soleglad & Anderson, 2004).
