= Alpiscorpius gamma =

Scientific classification
- Domain: Eukaryota
- Kingdom: Animalia
- Phylum: Arthropoda
- Subphylum: Chelicerata
- Class: Arachnida
- Order: Scorpiones
- Family: Euscorpiidae
- Genus: Alpiscorpius
- Species: A. gamma

Binomial name
- Alpiscorpius gamma (Di Caporiacco, 1950)

Synonyms
- Euscorpius germanus gamma Di Caporiacco, 1950; Euscorpius mingrelicus caprai Bonacina, 1980; Euscorpius gamma Di Caporiacco, 1950

Species of scorpion

Alpiscorpius gamma is a species of scorpion found in parts of Central and Southern Europe. Its body reaches the length of 32 mm and is darkly pigmented, but is largely indistinguishable from closely related species with which it forms the »mingrelicus complex«. The animal is not considered aggressive and has mild venom, so it is not dangerous to humans.

Its known range includes Austria, Italy, Slovenia and Croatia, being commonly distributed in Slovenia.

Alpiscorpius gamma inhabits humid habitats where it rests in crevices under tree bark, beneath rocks etc.

== Taxonomy ==
The taxon was originally described as a subspecies of Euscorpius germanus based on samples collected in southwest Slovenia and eastern Italy. At that time, Euscorpius germanus was thought to be distributed across large part of Europe, from Italy to Caucasus. However, a subsequent taxonomical revision split E. gamma's then parent species Euscorpius mingrelicus from E. germanus. The taxonomic status continued to be complicated due to frequent misidentification – the species can only be distinguished by microscopic morphological characters such as the distribution of sensory hairs on pedipalps, with the difference being apparent only after statistical analysis. Then, in 2000, taxonomists proved that specimens of Euscorpius germanus gamma can be clearly distinguished from related populations by molecular characters, so the subspecies was elevated to the species rank. A female collected near the mouth of Rižana river in Slovene Istria and kept in the collection of La Specola museum (Florence, Italy) was named type specimen. In 2019 the species was moved from Euscorpius to Alpiscorpius.
