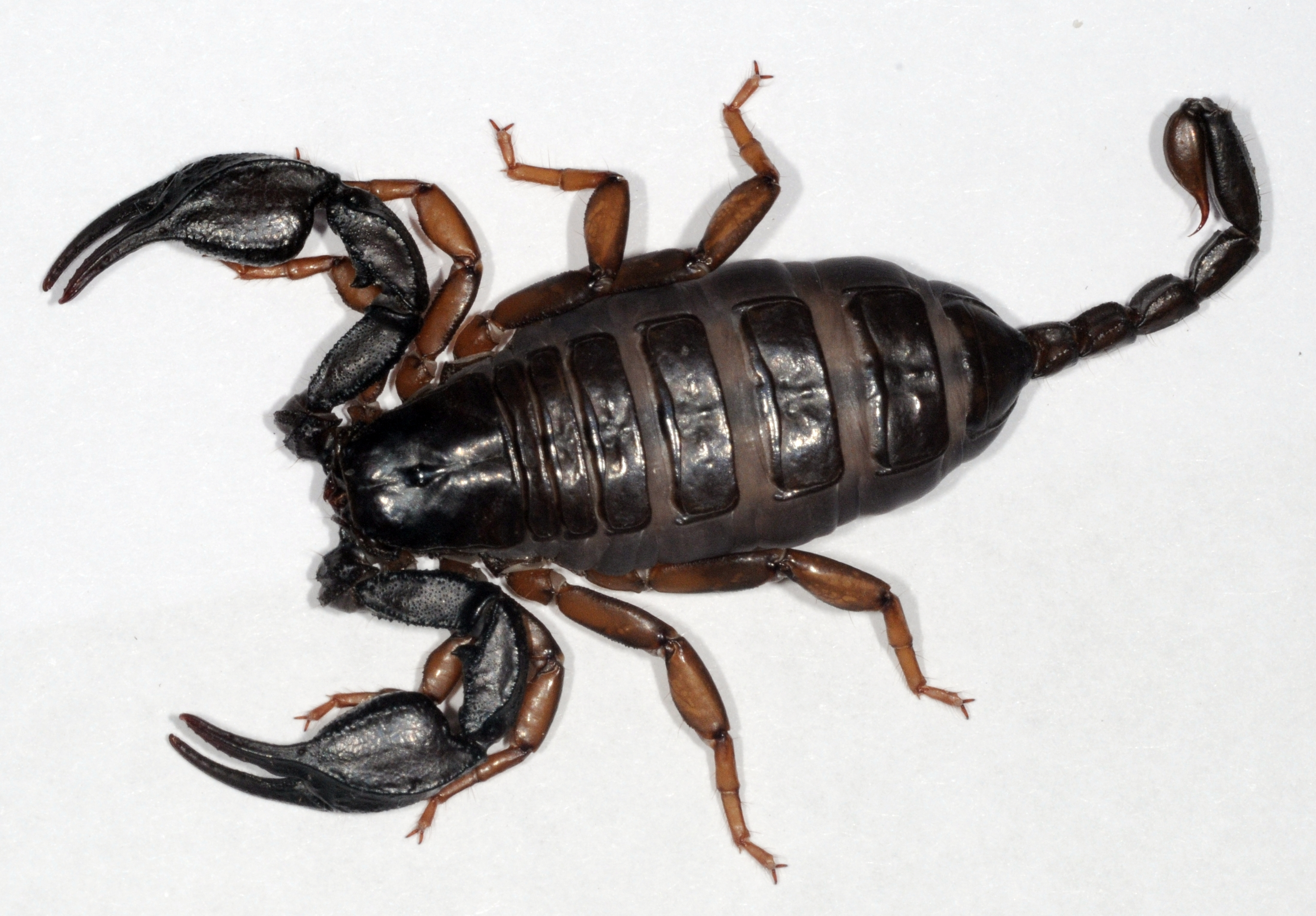

Scientific classification
- Kingdom: Animalia
- Phylum: Arthropoda
- Subphylum: Chelicerata
- Class: Arachnida
- Order: Scorpiones
- Parvorder: Iurida
- Superfamily: Chactoidea
- Family: Euscorpiidae
- Genus: Euscorpius
- Species: E. italicus

Binomial name
- Euscorpius italicus (Herbst, 1800)
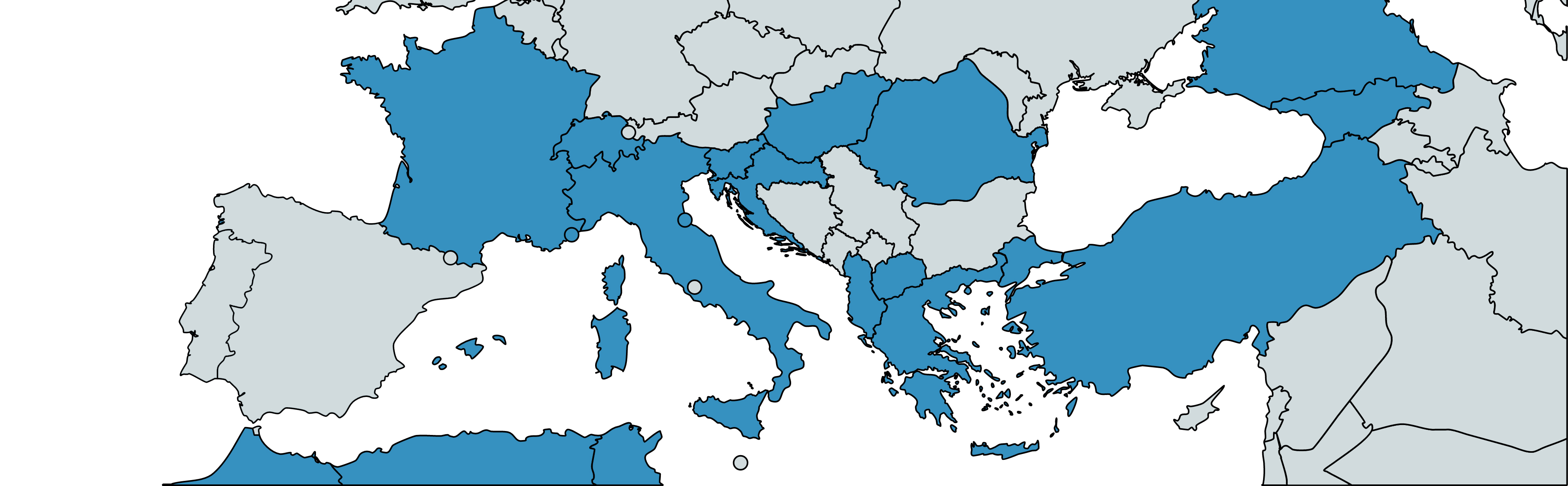
- Distribution in the Mediterranean and the Caucasus according to collected sources from The Scorpion Files
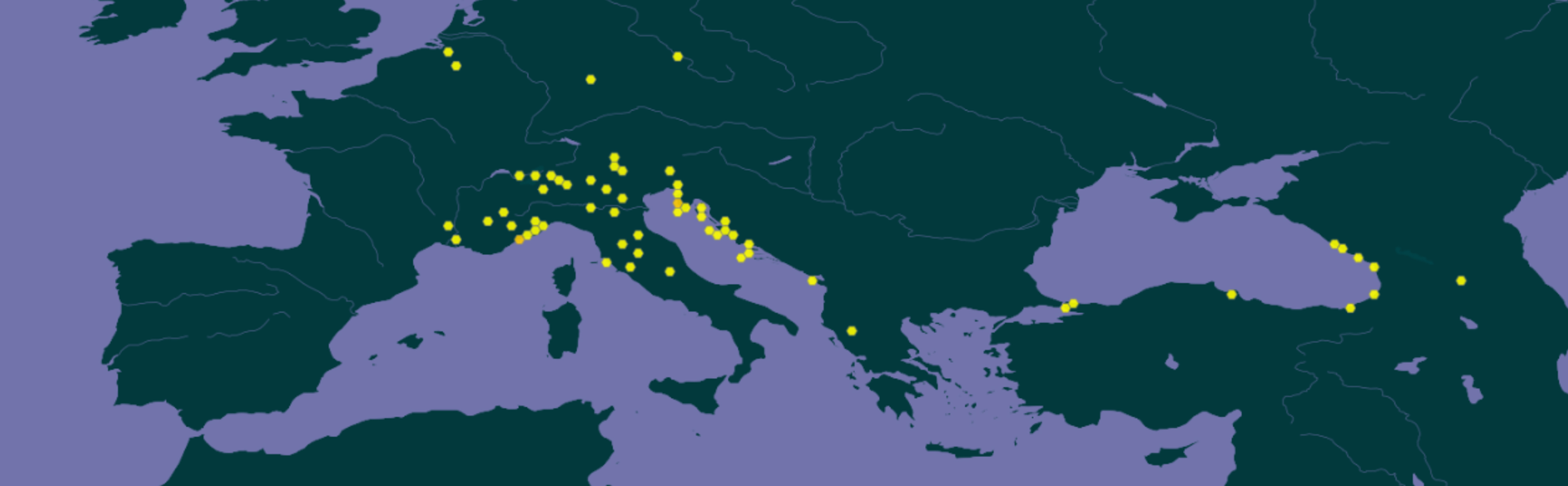
- Observations on GBIF as of January 2023

= Euscorpius italicus =

Small scorpion species found in Afro-Eurasia

Euscorpius italicus is a scorpion belonging to the genus of small wood-scorpions. It is the largest species in the genus, with adults reaching lengths up to 50 mm. Its size can thus be used as a heuristic for determination.

== Appearance ==
The coloration of E. italicus ranges from dark reddish brown to bluish black. The ventral side and telson are slightly lighter.

It differs from the other species of the genus by the significantly larger number of trichobothria on the underside of the chela manus, and by the large number of trichobothria on the outside of the patella of the pedipalps. The morphological differences between species in the genus Euscorpius are generally however small and identification is typically difficult.

Despite being the largest species in its genus, E. italicus significantly varies in size. Swiss specimens had lengths between 29.2 and 49.4 mm (1 1/8 and 2 in). Males had an average length of 37.3 mm (1 7/16 in), while females reached an average of 38.6 mm (1 1/2 in).

It is sometimes confused with Tetratrichobothrius flavicaudis.

== Distribution ==
The native range of E. italicus includes Morocco, Algeria, Tunisia, France, Monaco, Switzerland, San Marino, Italy, Hungary, Slovenia, Croatia, North Macedonia, Albania, Greece, Romania, Turkey, Georgia, and Russia. It has been introduced to Yemen.

The species was originally discovered in Italy, whence it acquired its scientific name. Even though there is no agreed upon common name, it may be called the Italian scorpion or the Italian small wood-scorpion. The former variant is used in several European languages, like Polish, Czech, and Italian.

== Behavior ==
Two females in conflict in Croatia

The scorpion is a predator of a range of arthropods. It only hunts prey smaller than itself. It has been seen hunting isopods such as Armadillidium vulgare, centipedes in the genus Cryptops and Scutigera, earwigs like Forficula auricularia, crickets like Gryllus campestris and Nemobius syvestris, as well as various moths and spiders.

So far, females with scorplings have only been observed outdoors in August and September, and mating is thought to exclusively take place during this period. Accordingly, the gestation period lasts 11 to 11.5 months. E. italicus is, like all other scorpions, viviparous: juveniles tear open their embryonic shell immediately after birth and climb on the mother's back. The number of young per female is between 9 and 62. Young scorpions leave their mother following their first molt, which takes place after 6 or 7 days.

To reach sexual maturity, males will require 5–6 molts, whereas females will require 6–7. This would suggest that males take 2–3 years and females 2.5–4 years to reach adulthood. The life expectancy of the species is taken to be between 4 and 8 years in the wild, while a specimen has been observed to live for over 10 years in a laboratory.

The scorpion leads a solitary life and spends most of its life in hiding. It is nocturnal and has a mild temperament.

== Habitat ==
This species can be found in a variety of warm habitats, such as ruins, buildings, under household furnishings, and in crevices of walls. It is most often encountered near humans or places that humans have considerably changed. In nature, it hides under rocks. In the Eastern Mediterranean, it can be found in mountain forests.

In terrariums, the scorpion prefers temperatures from 20 to 25 °C (68 to 77 °F) during the day and no less than 18 to 20 °C (64 to 68 °F) during the night, with humidity in the range of 50–70 %.

== Venom ==
E. italicus rarely uses its stinger and is considered to be harmless. In the event of a sting, it is enough to clean and disinfect the wound.

== Gallery ==
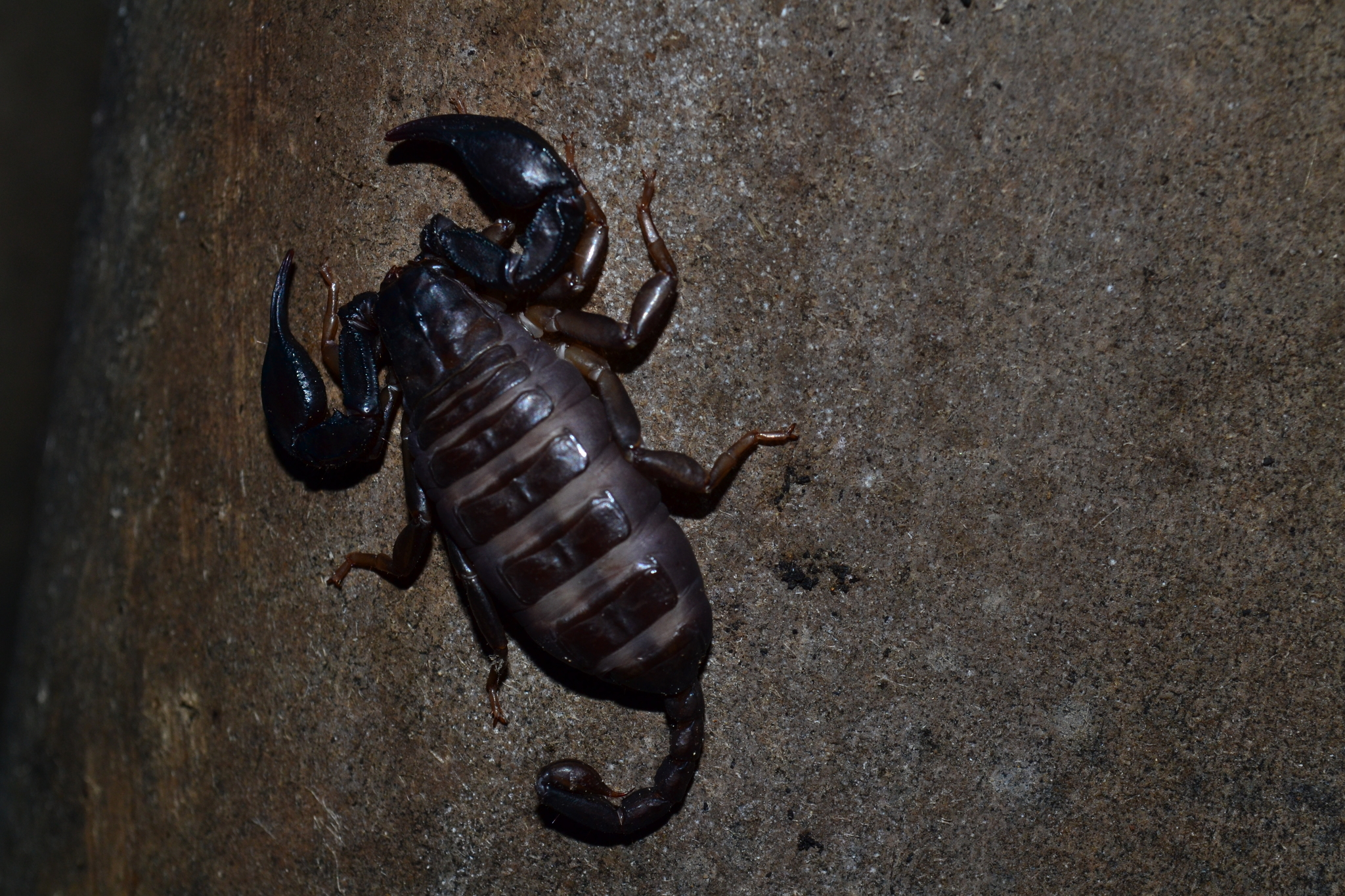
Adult female

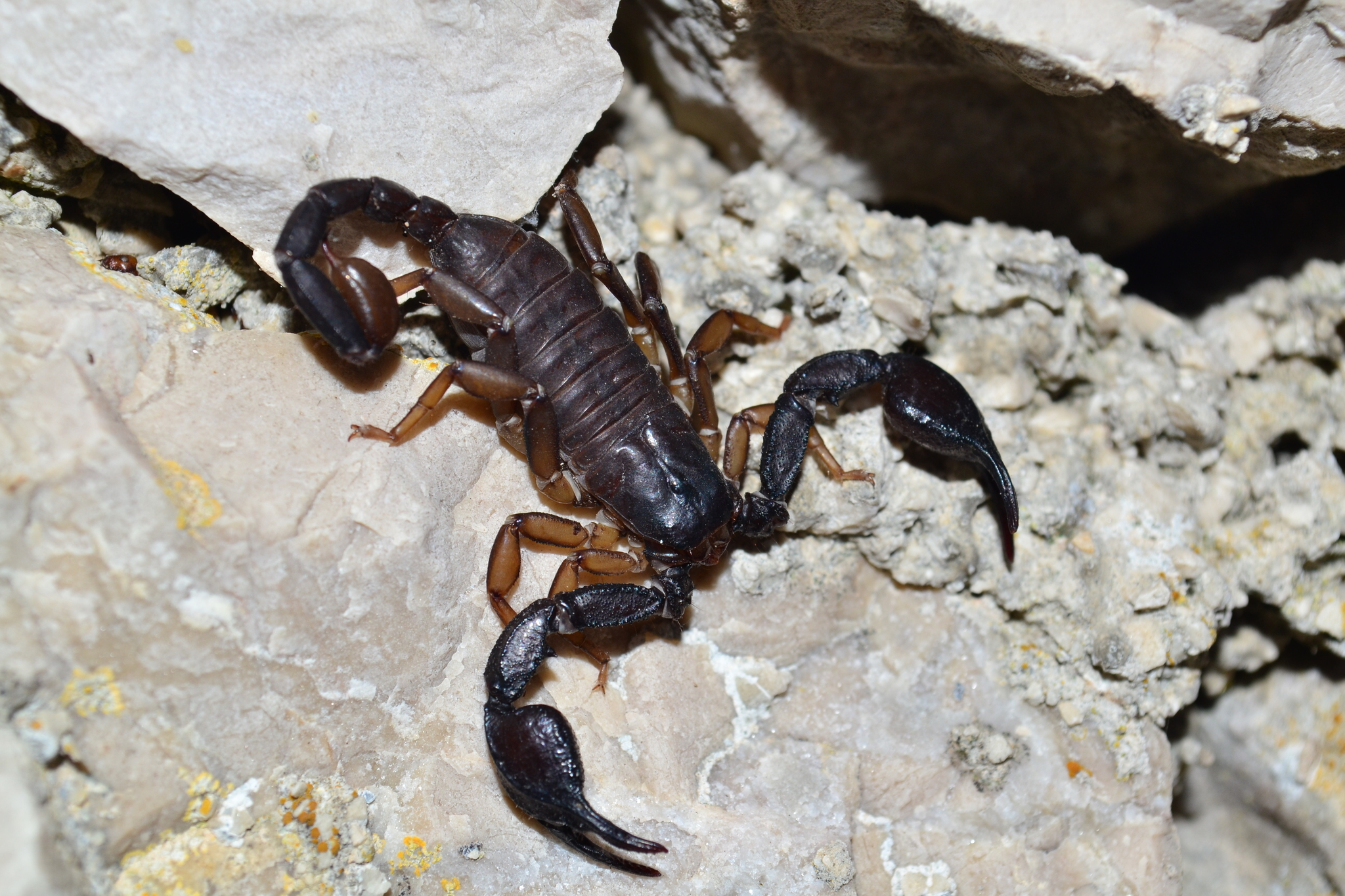
Adult male

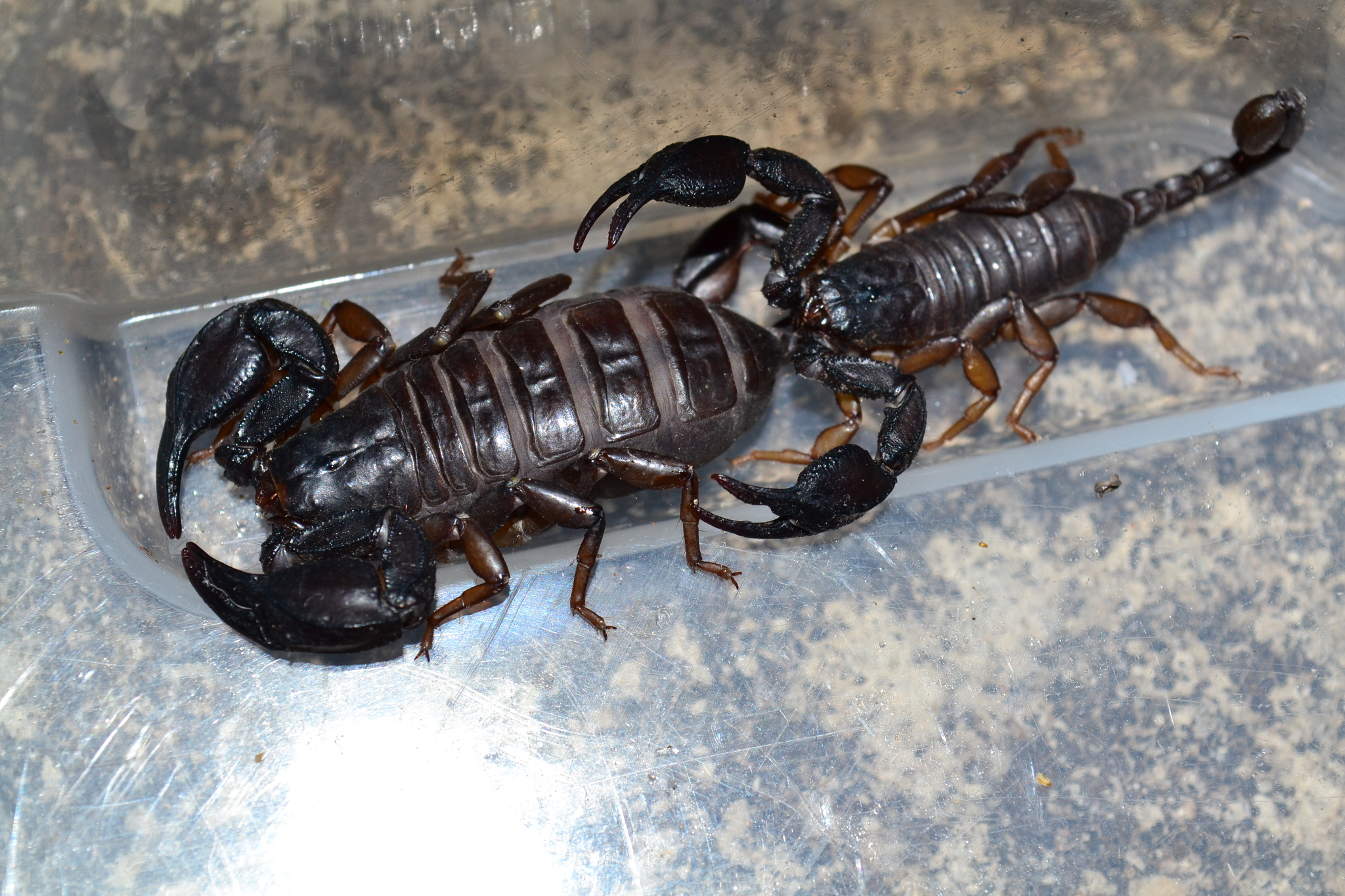
Adult male (right) and female (left) placed next to each other for comparison

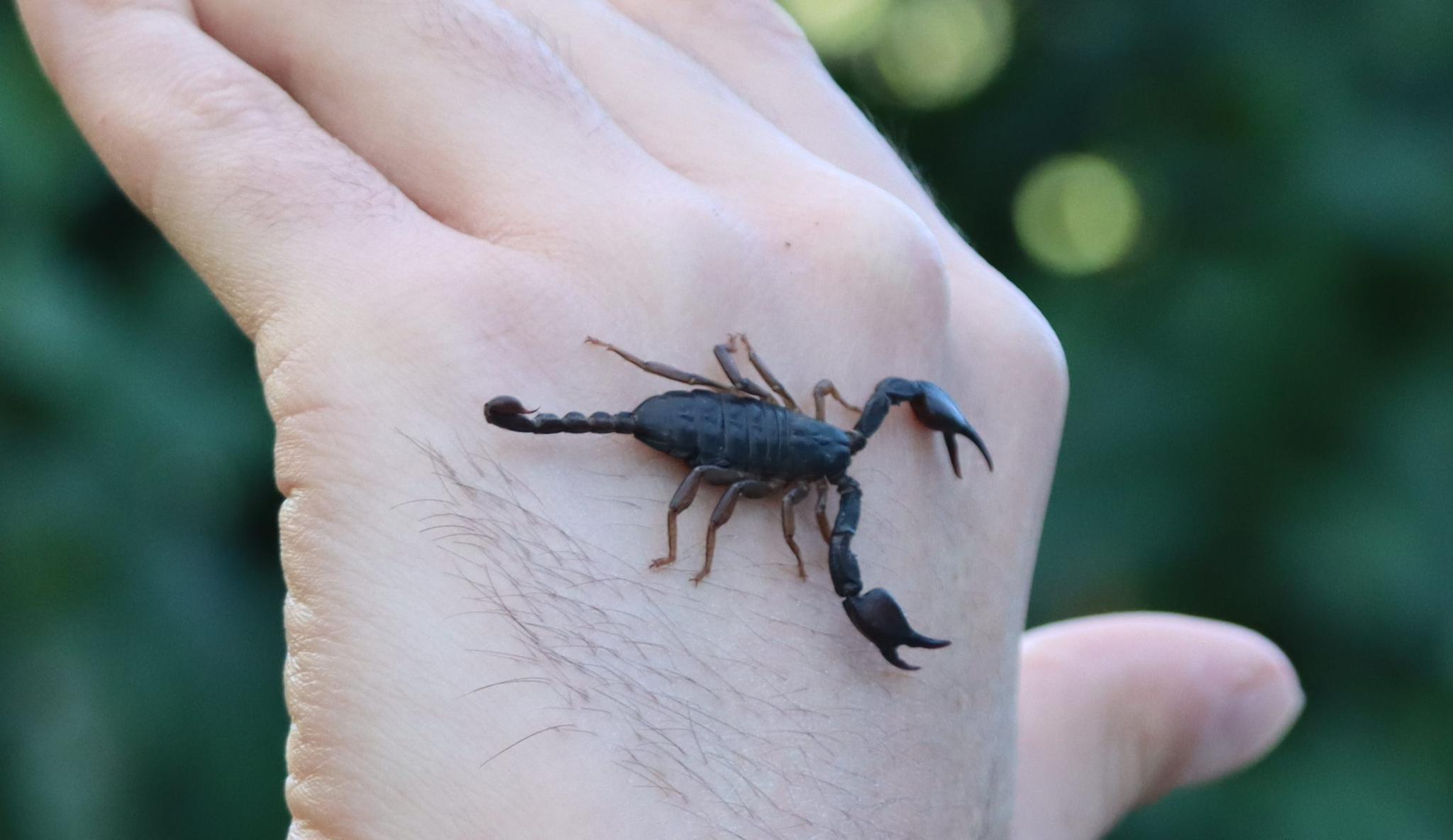
Handling the scorpion

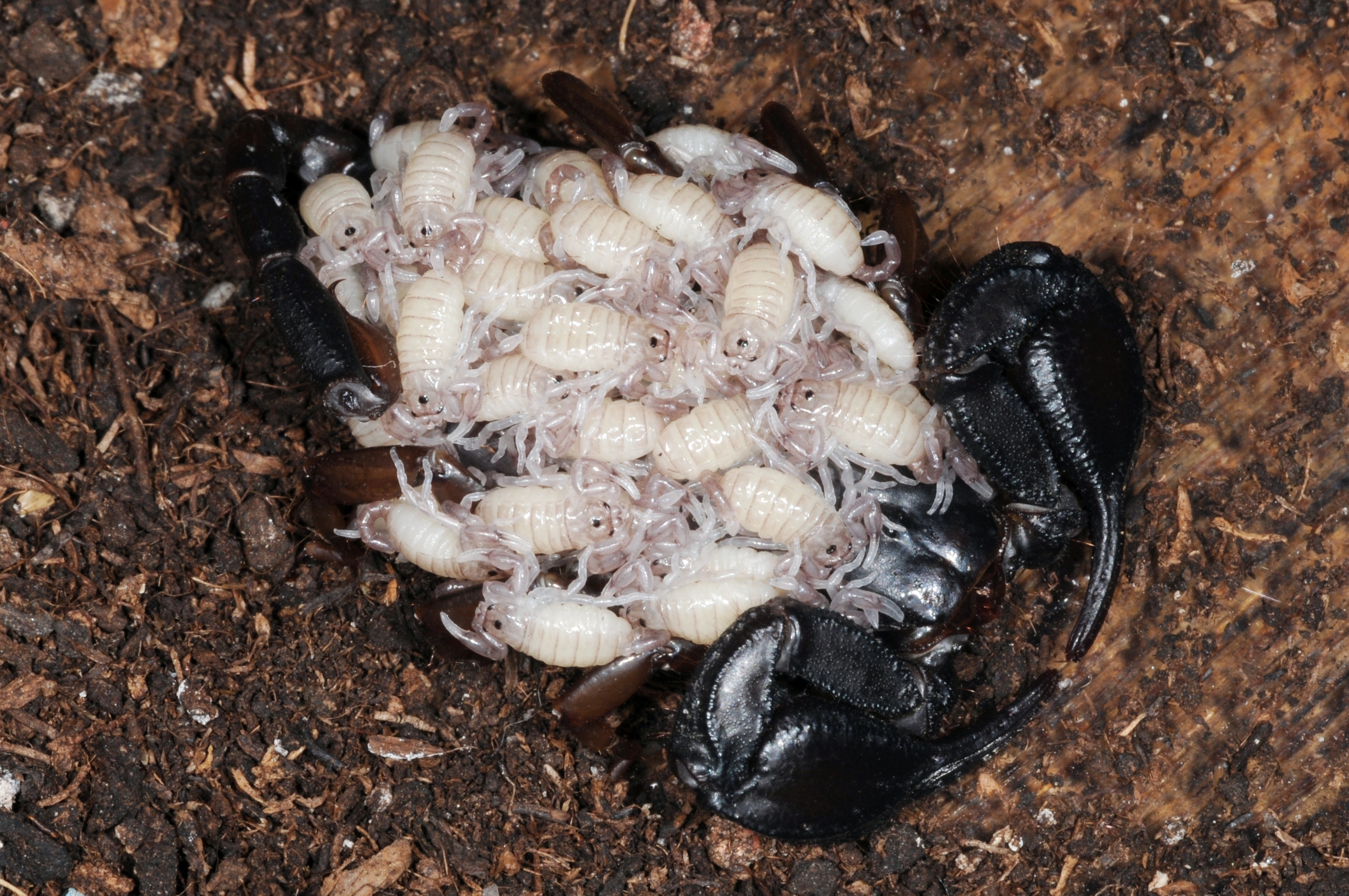
With scorplings

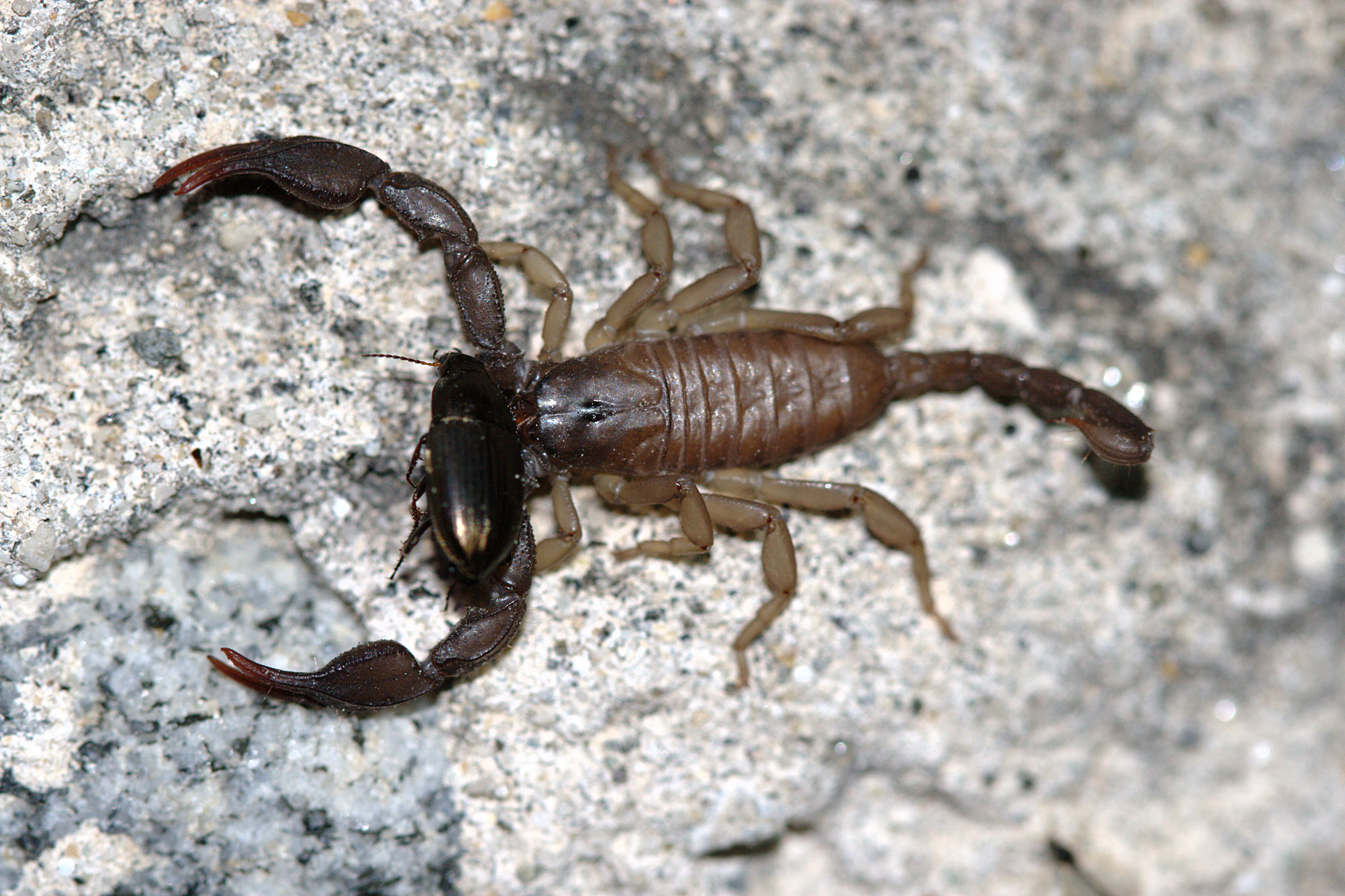
With prey

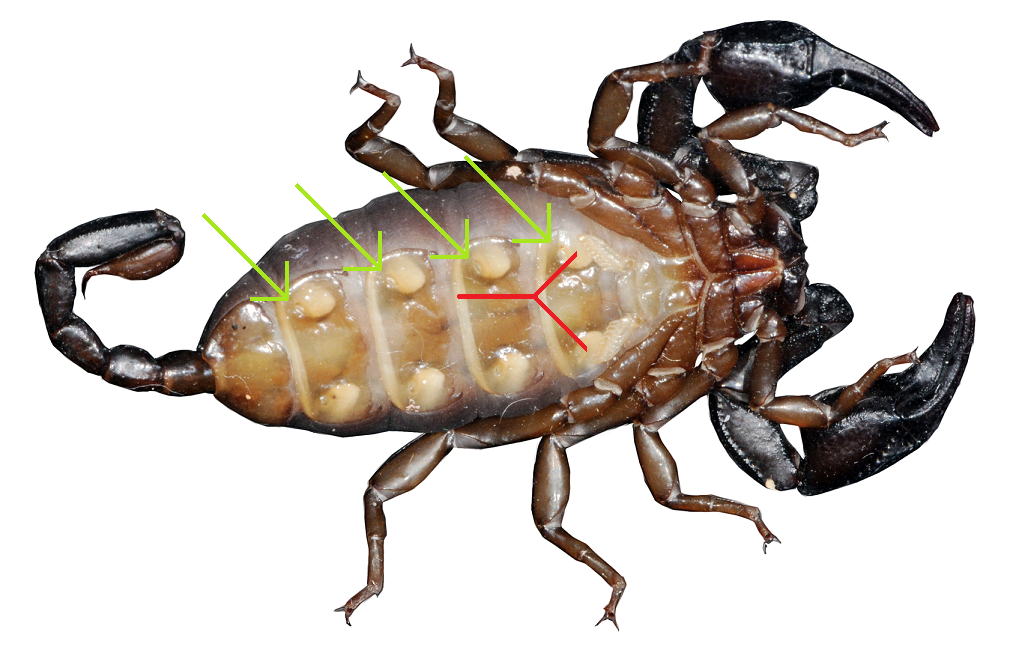
Ventral view

== Sources ==
- Braunwalder, Matt E. (2005). Scorpiones (Arachnida). Fauna Helvetica (in German and French). Vol. 13. Neuchâtel: CSCF & SEG. ISBN 2-88414-025-5.
