= Alpiscorpius dinaricus =

Scientific classification
- Kingdom: Animalia
- Phylum: Arthropoda
- Subphylum: Chelicerata
- Class: Arachnida
- Order: Scorpiones
- Family: Euscorpiidae
- Genus: Alpiscorpius
- Species: A. dinaricus

Binomial name
- Alpiscorpius dinaricus (Di Caporiacco, 1950)

Synonyms
- Euscorpius germanus dinaricus di Caporiacco, 1950; Euscorpius mingrelicus dinaricus (di Caporiacco, 1950) per Fet & Sissom, 2000; Euscorpius beroni Fet, 2000 (in Tropea, 2021)

Species of scorpion

Alpiscorpius dinaricus is a scorpion species distributed in Albania, Kosovo, Bosnia and Herzegovina, Croatia, Montenegro and Serbia.
