= Alpiscorpius lambda =

Scientific classification
- Kingdom: Animalia
- Phylum: Arthropoda
- Subphylum: Chelicerata
- Class: Arachnida
- Order: Scorpiones
- Family: Euscorpiidae
- Genus: Alpiscorpius
- Species: A. lambda

Binomial name
- Alpiscorpius lambda Kovařík, Štundlová, Fet & Šťáhlavský, 2019
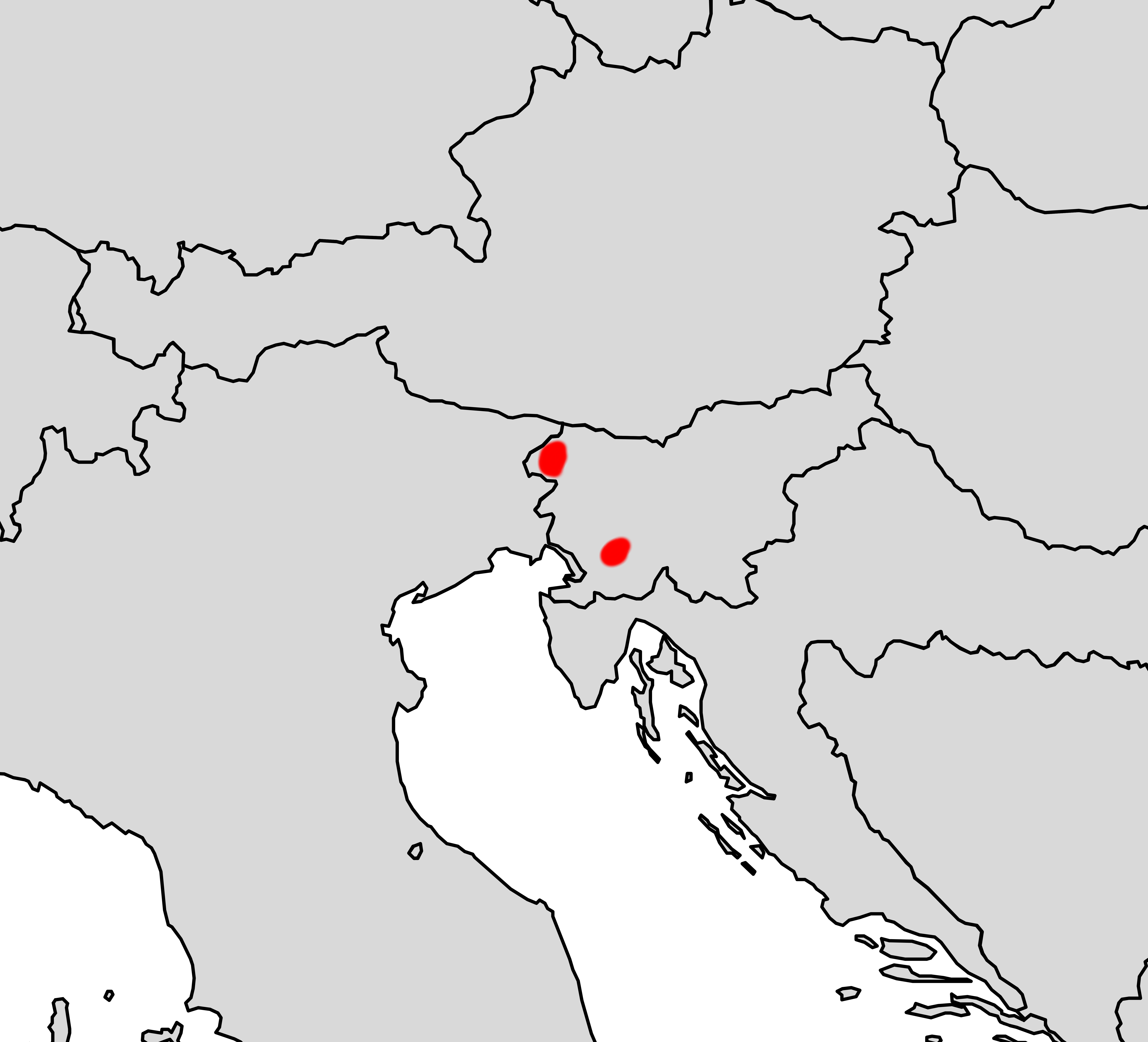
- Distribution of A. lambda in Slovenia

Species of scorpion

Alpiscorpius lambda is a species of scorpion in the family Euscorpiidae. It was described by Kovařík et al. in 2019.
