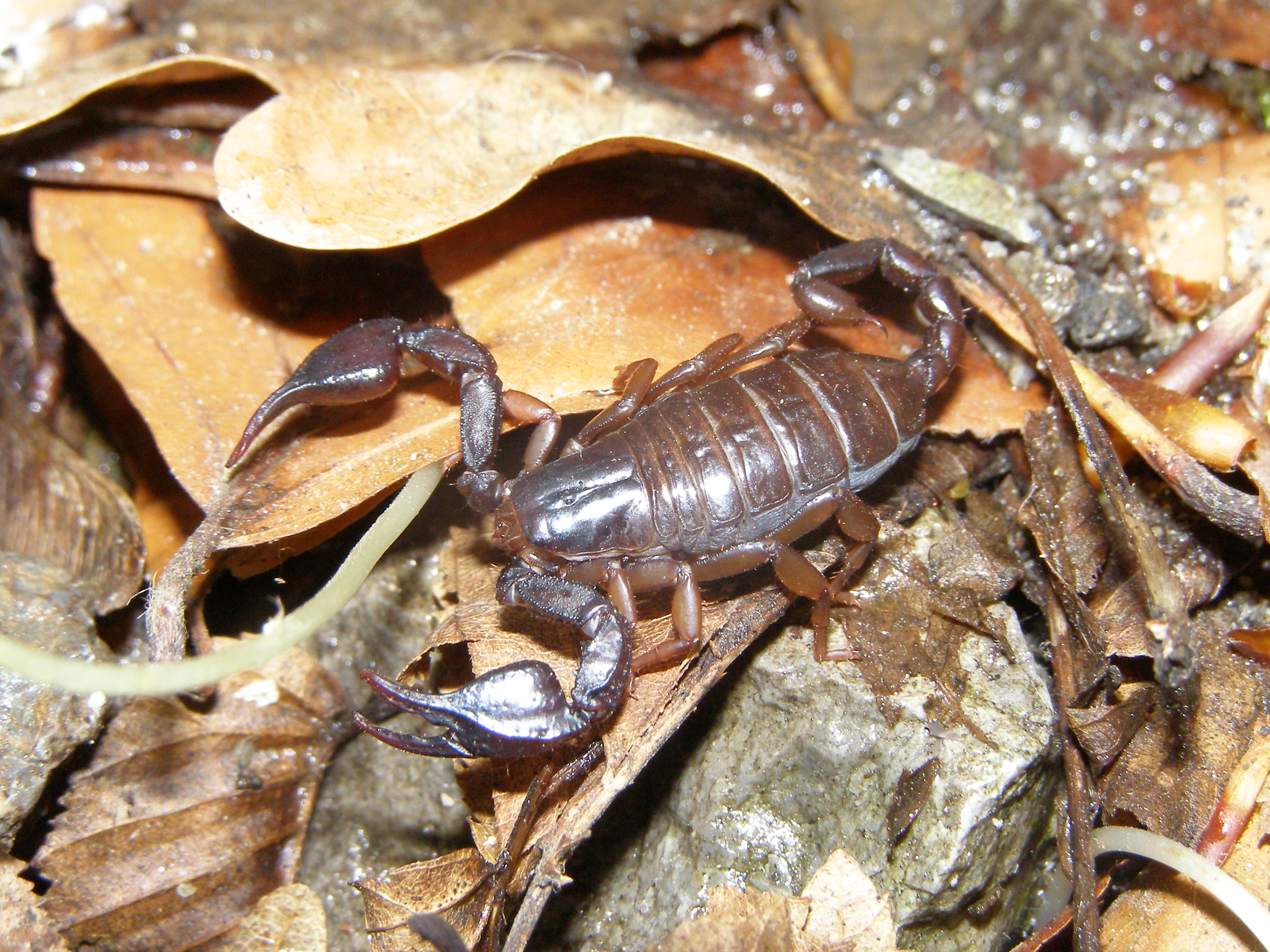

Scientific classification
- Kingdom: Animalia
- Phylum: Arthropoda
- Subphylum: Chelicerata
- Class: Arachnida
- Order: Scorpiones
- Family: Euscorpiidae
- Genus: Euscorpius
- Species: E. carpathicus

Binomial name
- Euscorpius carpathicus (Linnaeus, 1767)

Synonyms
- Buthus terminalis Brulle, 1832; Euscorpius aegaeus Di Caporiacco, 1950; Euscorpius fanzagoi Simon, 1841; Scorpio carpathicus Linnaeus, 1767; Scorpio germanicus Herbst, 1800; Scorpio pallipes Risso, 1826; Scorpius rufus C.L. Koch, 1837

= Euscorpius carpathicus =

Species of scorpion endemic to Romania

Euscorpius carpathicus is a species of scorpion endemic to the Romanian Carpathians. It is the type species of the genus Euscorpius.

== Taxonomy ==
Numerous species were previously identified as part of the Escorpius carpathicus species complex and were later clarified to a number of distinct species, including Euscorpius tergestinus and Euscorpius sicanus. However mitochondrial DNA-based phylogenetics identified these as separate species in 2003. Since then, Euscorpius carpathicus has been identified as an endemic species of Romania with a substantially more limited range.

== Distribution ==
The range of Euscorpius carpathicus is limited to the Carpathians and further fragmented into three isolated areas: the western portion of the Southern Carpathians (also known as the Banat Mountains), the Olt River gorge inside Cozia National Park, and the Buzău Mountains. It is likely that the fragmentation of these areas is due to deforestation. The upper altitude of its range is believed to be 450 meters.

The clay substratum in riparian areas of the Carpathians is believed to be important for Euscorpius carpathicus to survive the winters as it burrows into cracks and holes, as is common in other Euscorpius species. Euscorpius carpathicus is also found overwintering in areas with bush cover that create warmer microclimates in river valleys.
