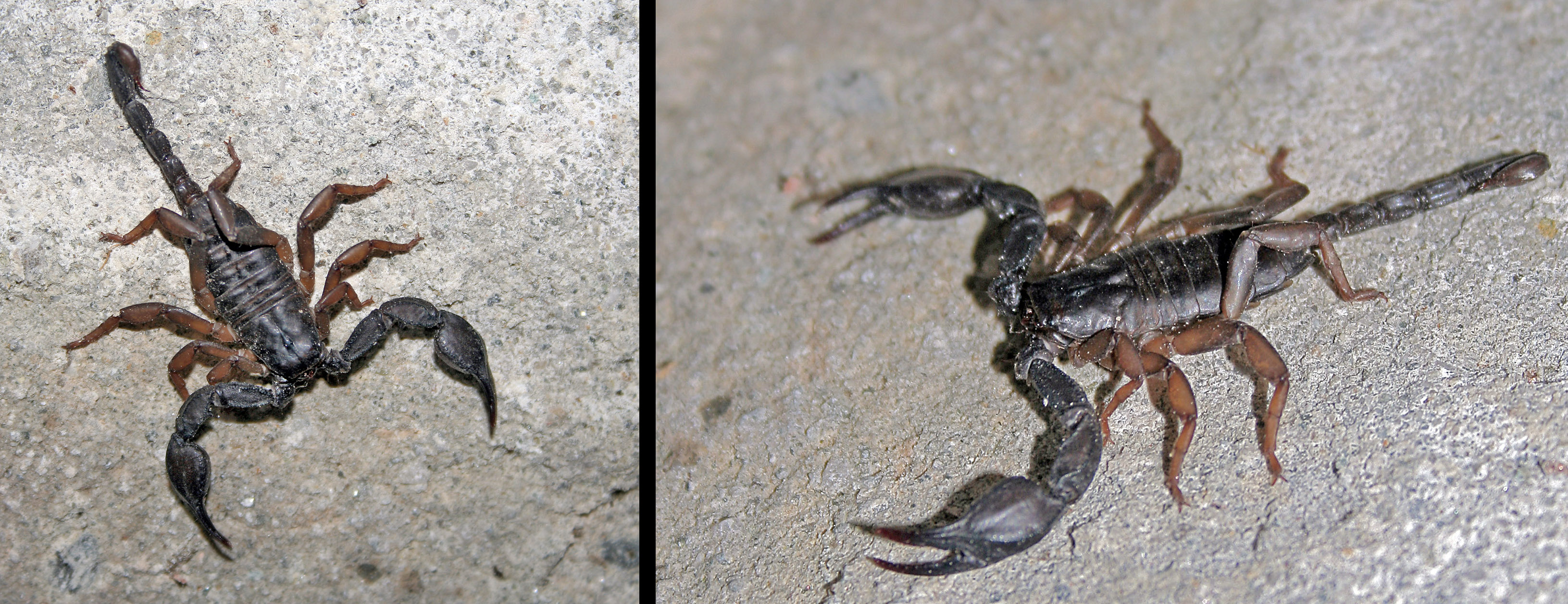

Scientific classification
- Domain: Eukaryota
- Kingdom: Animalia
- Phylum: Arthropoda
- Subphylum: Chelicerata
- Class: Arachnida
- Order: Scorpiones
- Family: Euscorpiidae
- Genus: Alpiscorpius
- Species: A. alpha

Binomial name
- Alpiscorpius alpha (Caporiacco, 1950)
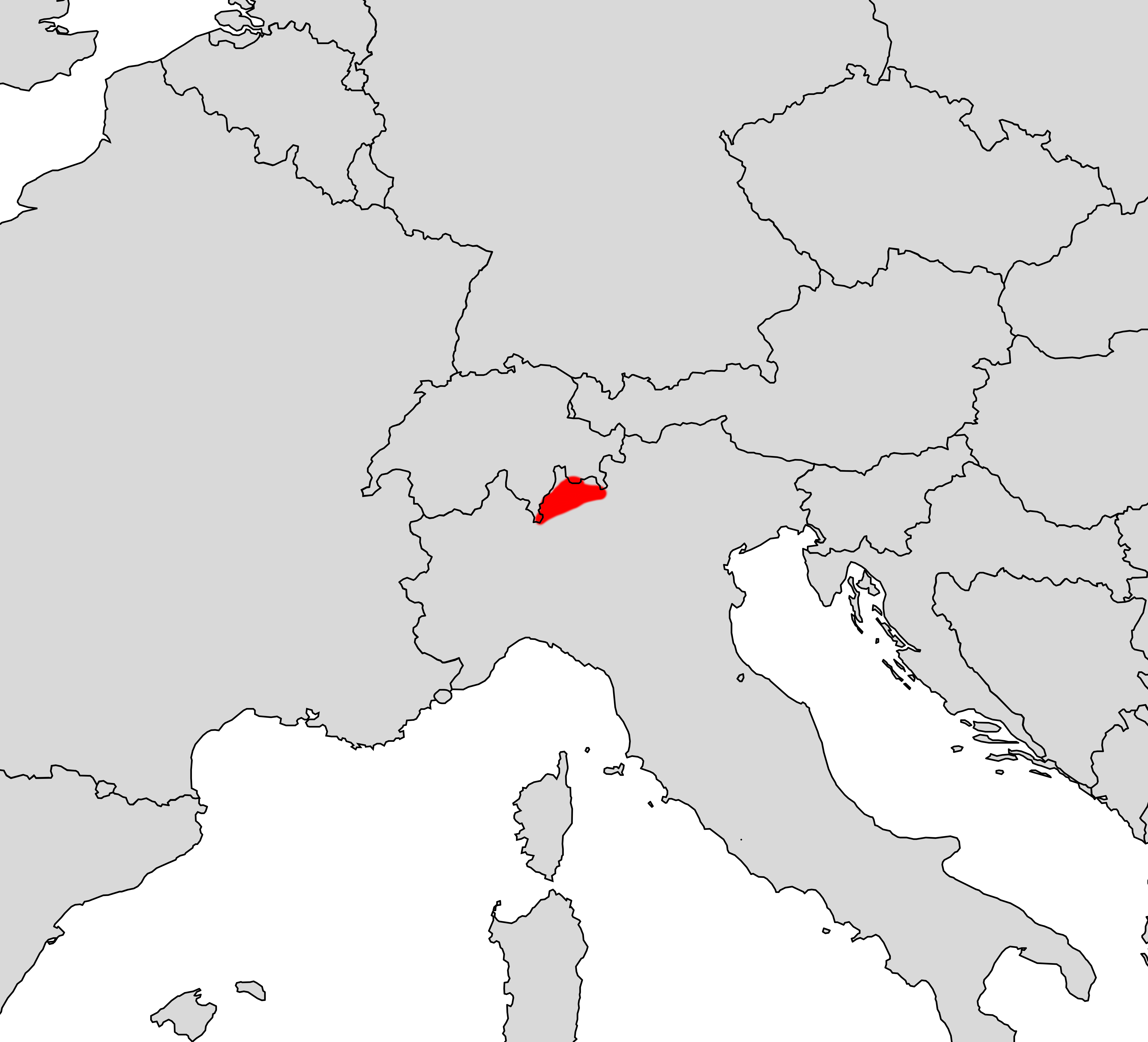
- Distribution of A. alpha in Europe

Synonyms
- Euscorpius alpha Caporiacco, 1950

= Alpiscorpius alpha =

Species of scorpion

Alpiscorpius alpha is a species of scorpion which is indigenous to southern Switzerland and northern Italy, west of the river Adige in northern Italy. It is a small, black scorpion, it is normally less than 30 mm (1.2 in) in length. It is usually found in humid, mountainous areas, under stones, logs etc., but also in humid parts of buildings such as cellars.
