= Euscorpius studentium =

Scientific classification
- Kingdom: Animalia
- Phylum: Arthropoda
- Subphylum: Chelicerata
- Class: Arachnida
- Order: Scorpiones
- Family: Euscorpiidae
- Genus: Euscorpius
- Species: E. studentium

Binomial name
- Euscorpius studentium Karaman, 2020

Species of scorpion

Euscorpius studentium is a scorpion belonging to the genus Euscorpius. It is found in Montenegro.

== Distribution ==
Euscorpius studentium is a troglobitic scorpion species endemic to Montenegro. It was described based on a single immature male specimen collected from the Skožnica cave in the Bar Municipality.

This species is the first recorded troglobitic scorpion within the European fauna. Some identified differences indicate evolutionary changes that are the result of the process of adaptation of troglobite scorpions for life under conditions found in underground habitats.
