= Alpiscorpius omega =

Scientific classification
- Kingdom: Animalia
- Phylum: Arthropoda
- Subphylum: Chelicerata
- Class: Arachnida
- Order: Scorpiones
- Family: Euscorpiidae
- Genus: Alpiscorpius
- Species: A. omega

Binomial name
- Alpiscorpius omega Kovařík, Štundlová, Fet & Šťáhlavský, 2019
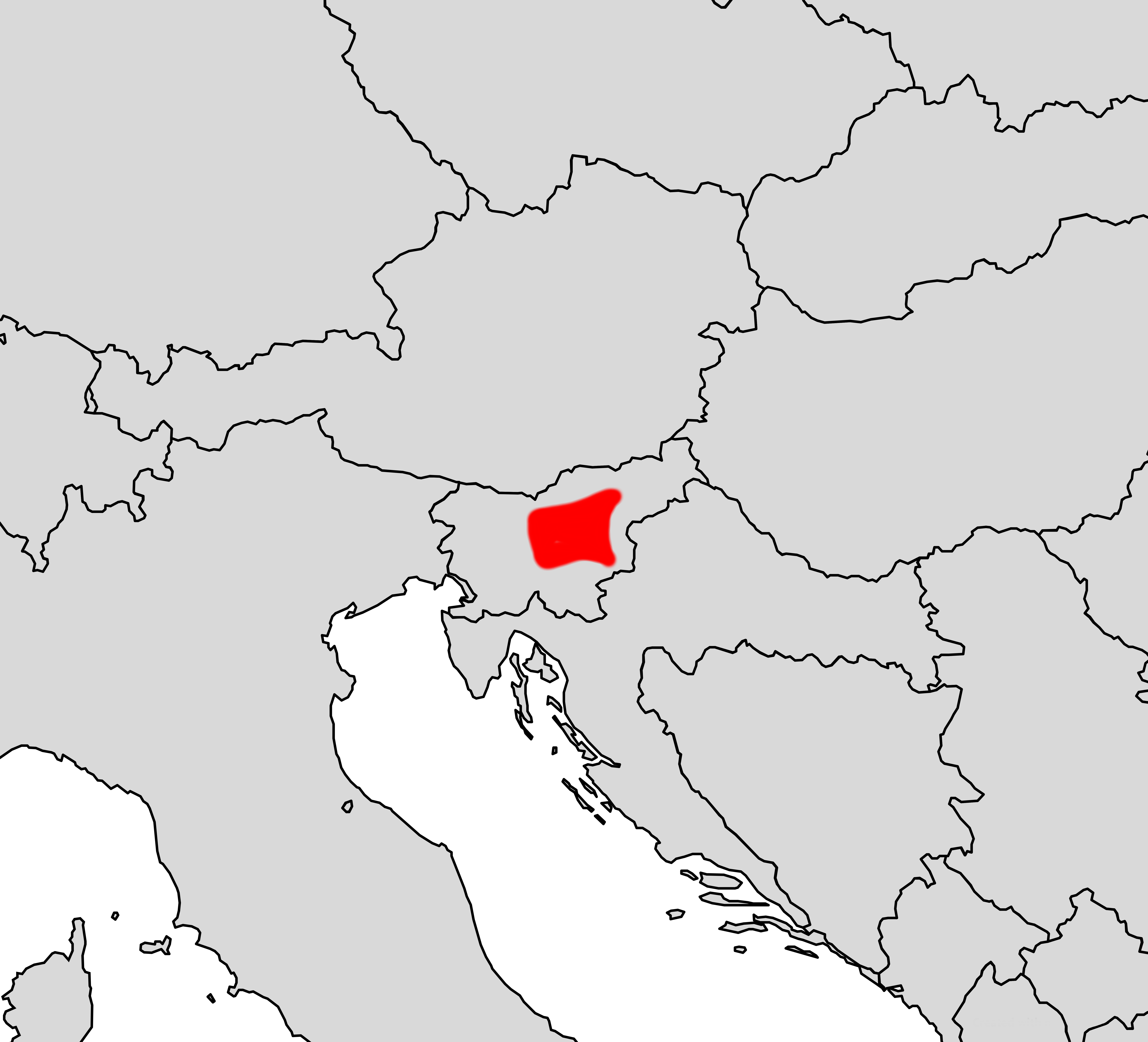
- Distribution of A. omega in Slovenia

Species of scorpion

Alpiscorpius omega is a species of scorpion in the family Euscorpiidae. It was described by Kovařík et al. in 2019.
