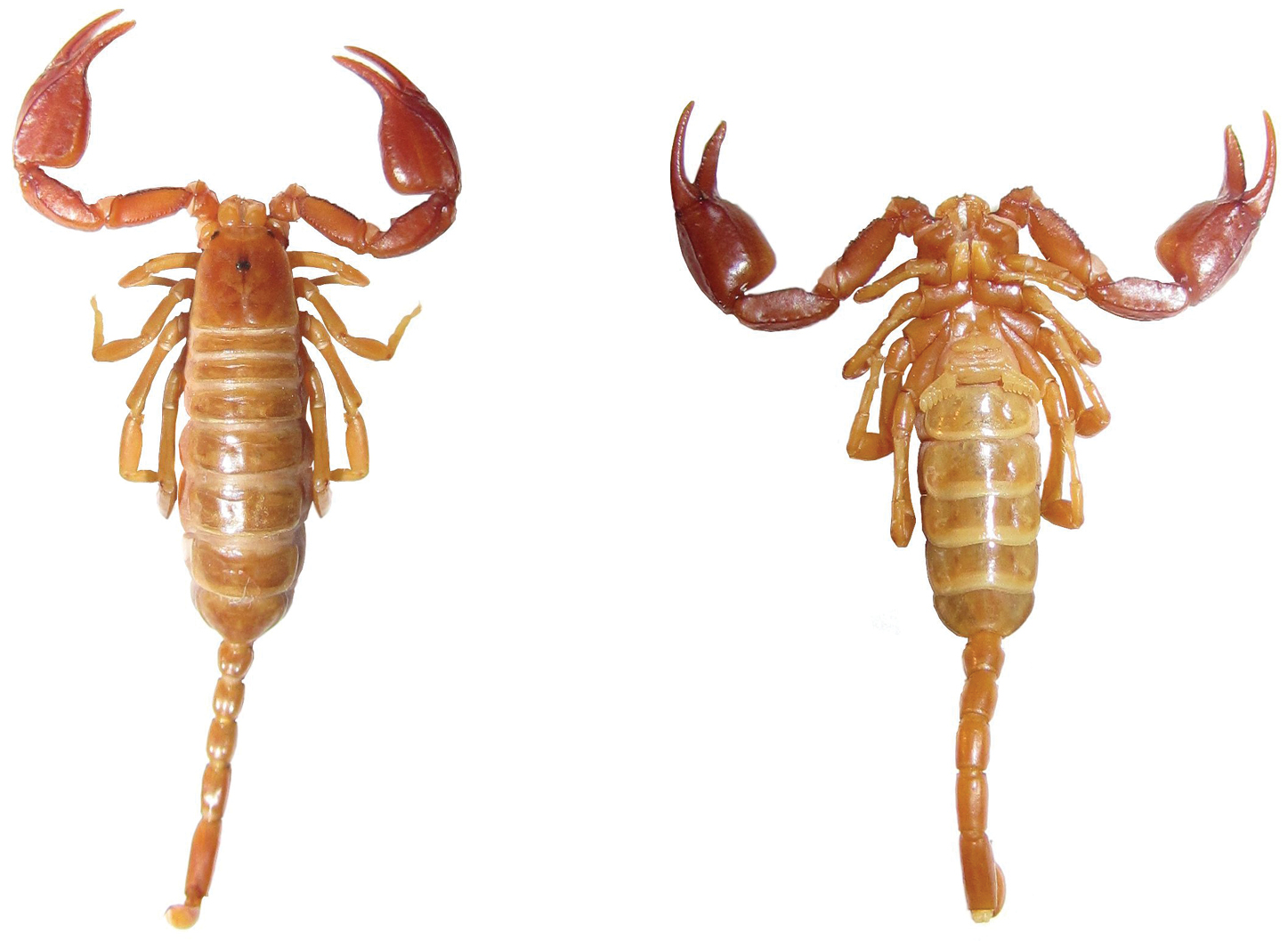

Scientific classification
- Domain: Eukaryota
- Kingdom: Animalia
- Phylum: Arthropoda
- Subphylum: Chelicerata
- Class: Arachnida
- Order: Scorpiones
- Family: Euscorpiidae
- Genus: Euscorpius
- Species: E. avcii

Binomial name
- Euscorpius avcii Tropea, Yağmur, Koç, Yeşilyurt & Rossi, 2012
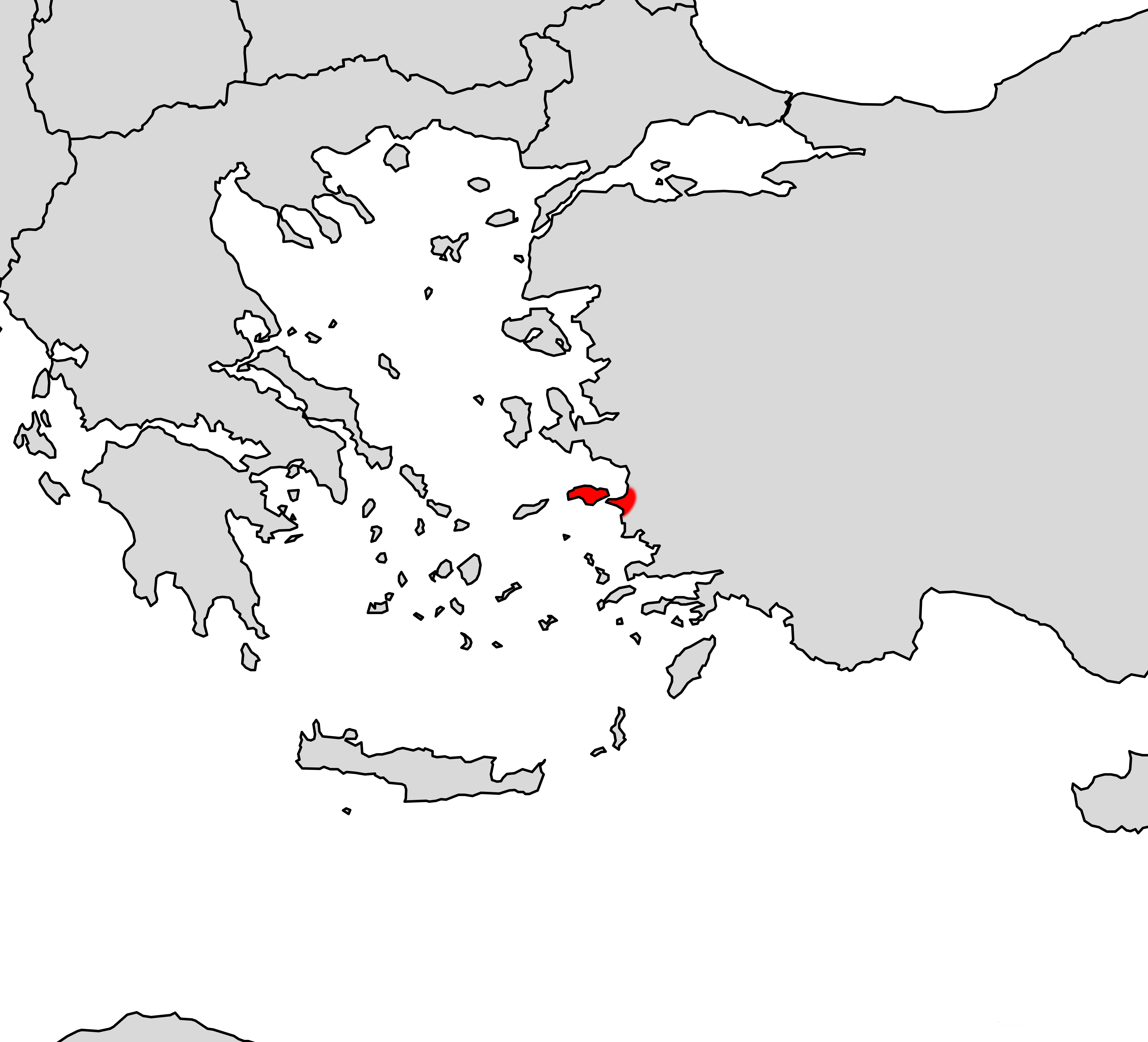
- Distribution of E. avcii in Greece and Turkey

= Euscorpius avcii =

Species of scorpion

Euscorpius avcii is a species of scorpion in the family Euscorpiidae. It was described by Tropea et al. in 2012.
