= Alpiscorpius beta =

Scientific classification
- Domain: Eukaryota
- Kingdom: Animalia
- Phylum: Arthropoda
- Subphylum: Chelicerata
- Class: Arachnida
- Order: Scorpiones
- Family: Euscorpiidae
- Genus: Alpiscorpius
- Species: A. beta

Binomial name
- Alpiscorpius beta (Di Caporiacco, 1950)
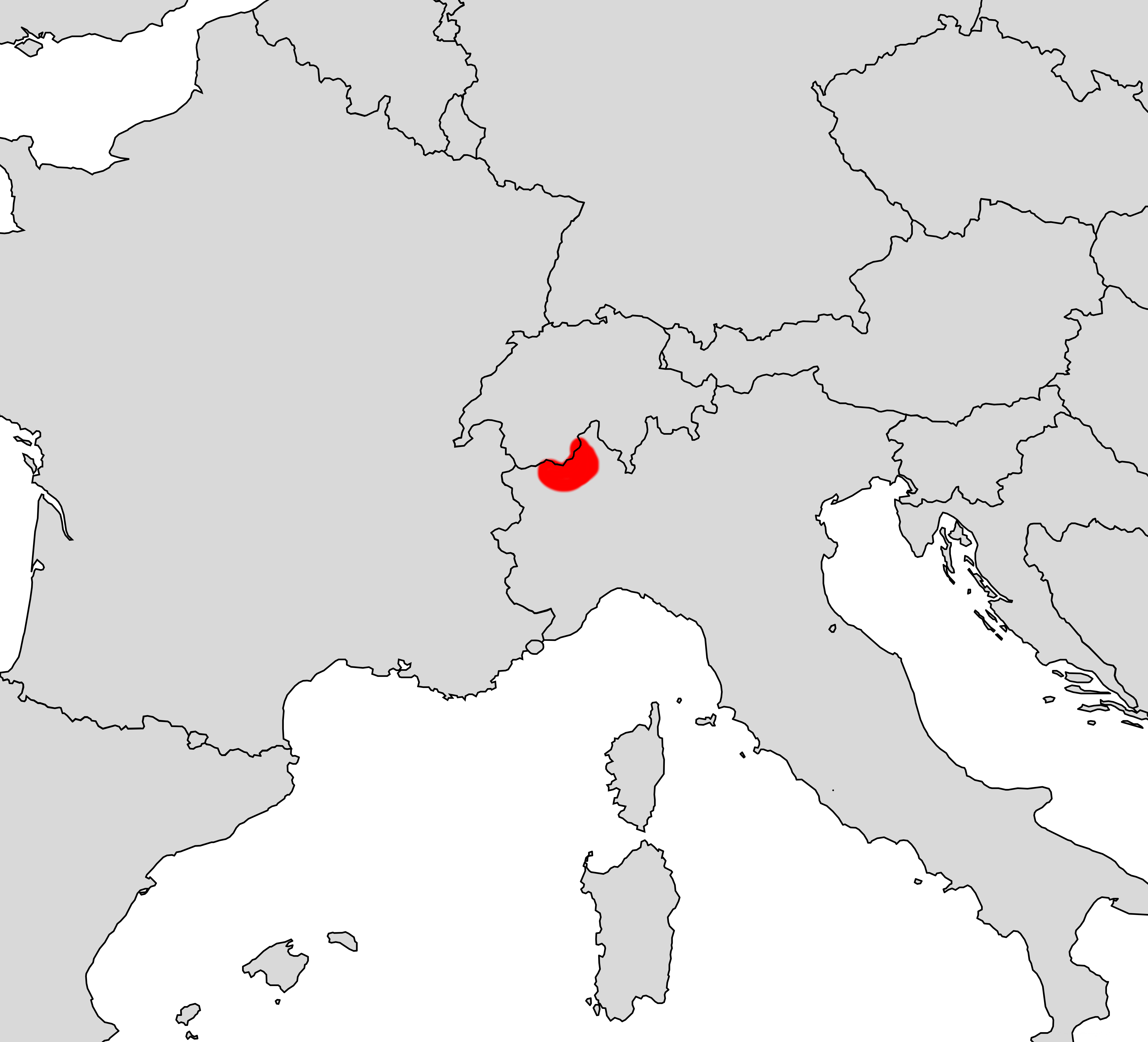
- Distribution of A. beta in Europe

Species of scorpion

Alpiscorpius beta is a species of scorpion in the family Euscorpiidae. It was described by Ludovico di Caporiacco in 1950.
