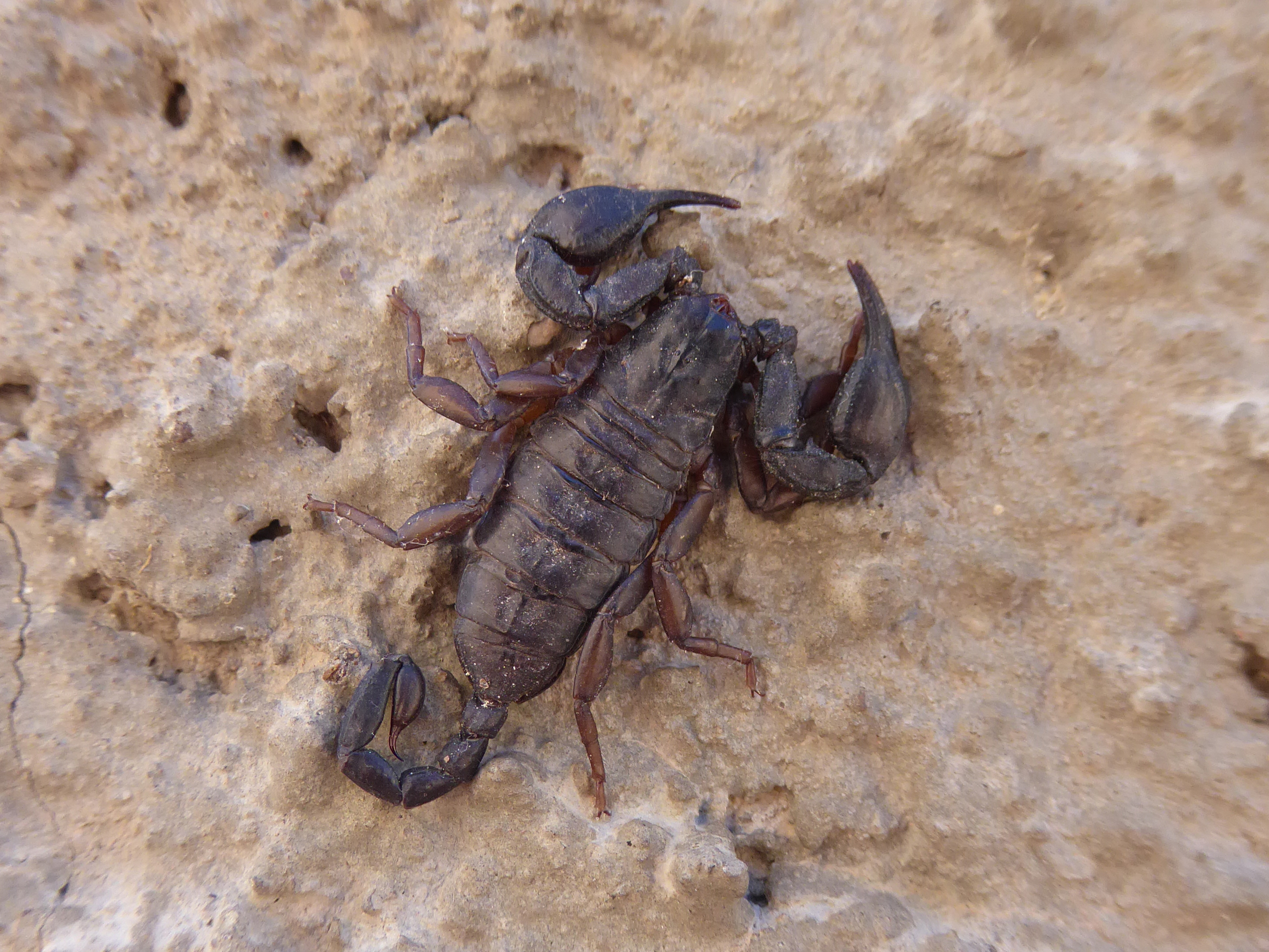
- Euscorpius italicus in italy

Scientific classification
- Kingdom: Animalia
- Phylum: Arthropoda
- Subphylum: Chelicerata
- Class: Arachnida
- Order: Scorpiones
- Family: Euscorpiidae
- Genus: Euscorpius; Thorell, 1876

Synonyms
- Acanthothraustes Mello-Leitão, 1945; Scorpius Poda, 1761

= Euscorpius =

Genus of scorpions

Euscorpius is a genus of scorpions, commonly called small wood-scorpions. It presently contains at least 90 species and is the type genus of the family Euscorpiidae – long included in the Chactidae – and the subfamily Euscorpiinae.

The most common members belong to the E. carpathicus species complex, which makes up the subgenus Euscorpius. This group is widespread from North Africa and Spain to temperate Eurasia from England and northern France through the Czech Republic to Russia.

The species range in colour from yellow-brown to dark brown. Many are brown with yellow legs and stinger. The largest is E. italicus at 5 cm (2 in), and the smallest is E. germanus at 1.5 cm (0.6 in). The venom of Euscorpius species is generally very weak, with effects similar to a mosquito bite. Some smaller specimens may not even be able to puncture the human skin with their stings.

== Species ==
Euscorpius contains at least 90 species:

- Euscorpius aladaglarensis Tropea & Yagmur, 2016 (Turkey)
- Euscorpius alanyaensis Tropea, Yagmur, Parmakelis & Kunt, 2016 (Turkey)
- Euscorpius altadonnai Tropea, 2017 (Italy including Sicily)
- Euscorpius amorgensis Tropea, Fet, Parmakelis, Kotsakiozi & Stathi, 2017 (Amorgos Island, Greece)
- Euscorpius aquilejensis (C. L. Koch, 1837) (Croatia, Italy, San Marino, Slovenia, Vatican City)
- Euscorpius arikani Yagmur & Tropea, 2015 (Turkey)
- Euscorpius avcii Tropea, Yagmur, Koc, Yesilyurt & Rossi, 2012 (Samos island, Greece and Turkey)
- :Euscorpius balearicus Caporiacco, 1950 (Mallorca, Spain)
- Euscorpius biokovensis Tropea & Ozimec, 2020 (Bosnia & Hercegovina and Croatia)
- Euscorpius birulai Fet, Soleglad, Parmakelis, Kotsakiozi & Stathi, 2014 (Evia island, Greece)
- Euscorpius bonacinai Kovarik & Stahlavsky, 2020 (Albania)
- Euscorpius borovaglavaensis Tropea, 2015 (Bosnia & Hercegovina and Croatia)
- Euscorpius calabriae Di Caporiacco, 1950 (Italy)
- Euscorpius candiota Birula, 1903 (Crete, Greece)
- Euscorpius canestrinii (Fanzago, 1872) (Sardinia, Italy)
- Euscorpius carpathicus (Linnaeus, 1767) (Albania, Austria, Belgium, Bosnia & Hercegovina, Croatia, Georgia, Greece including Corfu, Crete and Aegean Islands, France including Corsica, Italy including Sicily, Romania, Russia, Malta, Monaco, Serbia, Slovenia, Spain, Switzerland, Turkey, Tunisia, Ukraine)
- Euscorpius celanus Tropea, 2012 (Italy)
- Euscorpius ciliciensis Birula, 1898 (Turkey)
- Euscorpius concinnus (C. L. Koch, 1837) (Italy)
- Euscorpius corcyraeus Tropea & Rossi, 2011 (Corfu, Greece)
- Euscorpius curcici Tropea, Fet, Parmakelis, Kotsakiozi & Stathi, 2017 (Ios and Sikinos Islands, Greece)
- Euscorpius deltshevi Fet, Graham, Webber & Blagoev, 2014 (Bulgaria and Serbia)
- Euscorpius diagorasi Kalaentzis & Frigioni, 2026 (Greece)
- Euscorpius drenskii Tropea, Fet, Parmakelis, Kotsakiozi & Stathi, 2015 (Bulgaria)
- Euscorpius erymanthius Tropea, Fet, Parmakelis, Kotsakiozi & Stathi, 2013 (Greece)
- Euscorpius eskisehirensis Tropea & Yagmur, 2015 (Turkey)
- Euscorpius feti Tropea, 2013 (Croatia)
- Euscorpius garganicus Caporiacco, 1950 (Croatia and Italy)
- Euscorpius giachinoi Tropea & Fet, 2015 (Greece)
- Euscorpius gocmeni Tropea, Yagmur & Yesilyurt, 2014 (Turkey)
- Euscorpius gulhanimae Yagmur, 2024 (Turkey)
- Euscorpius hadzii Caporiacco, 1950 (Albania, Bosnia & Hercegovina, Bulgaria, Croatia, Greece, Montenegro and North Macedonia)
- Euscorpius hyblaeus Tropea, 2016 (Sicily, Italy and Malta)
- Euscorpius idaeus Yagmur & Tropea, 2017 (Lesvos Island, Greece)
- Euscorpius italicus (Herbst, 1800) (Albania, Algeria, Balearic Islands (Spain), Bosnia & Hercegovina, Croatia, France including Corsica, Georgia, Greece, Hungary, Romania, Russia, Italy including Sardinia and Sicily, Libya, Monaco, Montenegro, San Marino, Slovenia, Turkey, Tunisia)
- Euscorpius janstai Kovarik & Stahlavsky, 2020 (North Macedonia)
- Euscorpius kabateki Kovarik & Stahlavsky, 2020 (Greece)
- Euscorpius kinzelbachi Tropea, Fet, Parmakelis, Kotsakiozi & Stathi, 2014 (Greece)
- Euscorpius koci Tropea & Yagmur, 2015 (Turkey)
- Euscorpius koschewnikowi Birula, 1900 (Greece)
- Euscorpius kritscheri Fet, Soleglad, Parmakelis, Kotsakiozi & Stathi, 2013 (Tinos Island, Greece)
- Euscorpius lagostae Caporiacco, 1950 (Lastovo Island, Croatia)
- Euscorpius latinus Tropea & Parmakelis, 2022 (Italy)
- Euscorpius lesbiacus Tropea, Fet, Parmakelis, Kotsakiozi, Stathi & Zafeiriou, 2020 (Lesvos island, Greece)
- Euscorpius lycius Yagmur, Tropea & Yesilyurt, 2013 (Turkey)
- Euscorpius mingrelicus (Kessler, 1874) (Georgia and Turkey)
- Euscorpius mylonasi Fet, Soleglad, Parmakelis, Kotsakiozi & Stathi, 2014 (Evia island, Greece)
- Euscorpius naupliensis (C. L. Koch, 1837) (Greece including Zakynthos)
- Euscorpius niciensis (C. L. Koch, 1841) (France and Italy)
- Euscorpius oglasae Di Caporiacco, 1950 (Montecristo island, Italy)
- Euscorpius olympus Blasco-Arostegui & Prendini, 2023 (Greece)
- Euscorpius ossae Di Capriacco, 1950 (Greece)
- Euscorpius parthenopeius Tropea, Parmakelis, Sziszkosz, Balanika & Bouderka, 2014 (Ischia island, Italy)
- Euscorpius petaberoni Tropea, Fet, Parmakelis & Stathi, 2024 (Bulgaria)
- Euscorpius phrygius Tropea & Yagmur, 2015 (Turkey)
- Euscorpius popovi Tropea, Fet, Parmakelis, Kotsakiozi & Stathi, 2015 (Greece)
- Euscorpius sadileki Kovarik & Stahlavsky, 2020 (Serbia)
- Euscorpius salentinus Tropea, 2017 (Italy)
- Euscorpius scaber Birula, 1900 (Greece including Thasos island)
- Euscorpius scheraboni Kovarik & Stahlavsky, 2020 (Greece)
- Euscorpius sicanus (C. L. Koch, 1837) (Sicily, Italy)
- Euscorpius simaiakisi Tropea, Fet, Parmakelis & Stathi, 2022 (Andros Island, Greece)
- Euscorpius solegladi Fet, Graham, Webber & Blagoev, 2014 (Greece)
- Euscorpius stahlavskyi Tropea, Fet, Parmakelis, Kotsakiozi & Stathi, 2014 (Greece. However it may also be present in Albania)
- Euscorpius stefaniae Tropea & Parmakelis, 2022 (Italy)
- Euscorpius studentium Karaman, 2020 (Montenegro)
- Euscorpius sulfur Kovařík, Audy, Sarbu & Fet, 2023 (Albania and Greece)
- Euscorpius sultanensis Tropea & Yagmur, 2016 (Turkey)
- Euscorpius tauricus (C. L. Koch, 1837) (Crimea (Ukraine), Cyclades Islands (Greece) and Turkey)
- Euscorpius tergestinus (C.L. Koch, 1837) (Slovenia, Croatia, Italy, introduced to Austria and Czech Republic)
- Euscorpius thracicus Kovarik, Lowe, Byronova & Stahlavsky, 2020 (Bulgaria)
- Euscorpius trejaensis Tropea & Parmakelis, 2022 (Italy)
- Euscorpius triantisi Tropea, Fet, Parmakelis & Stathi, 2022 (Skyros island, Greece)
- Euscorpius trichasi Tropea, Fet, Parmakelis & Stathi, 2024 (Greece)
- Euscorpius uludagensis Lacroix, 1995 (Turkey)
- Euscorpius vailatii Tropea & Fet, 2015 (Greece)
- Euscorpius vignai Tropea, Fet, Parmakelis, Kotsakiozi & Stathi, 2014 (Karpathos and Kasos Islands, Greece)
- Euscorpius yagmuri Kovarik, Fet & Soleglad, 2014 (Greece)
