= Alpiscorpius =

Scientific classification
- Kingdom: Animalia
- Phylum: Arthropoda
- Subphylum: Chelicerata
- Class: Arachnida
- Order: Scorpiones
- Family: Euscorpiidae
- Genus: Alpiscorpius; Gantenbein et al., 1999

Genus of scorpions

Alpiscorpius is a genus of scorpions in the family Euscorpiidae that was first described by Benjamin Gantenbein, Victor Fet, Carlo Largiader & Adolf Scholl in 1999.

== Species ==
Alpiscorpius contains the following twenty eight species:

- Alpiscorpius akkayai Yağmur, 2026
- Alpiscorpius alpha (Caporiaco, 1950)
- Alpiscorpius beta (Caporiacco, 1950)
- Alpiscorpius caporiaccoi (Bonacina, 1980)
- Alpiscorpius croaticus (Caporiacco, 1950)
- Alpiscorpius delta Kovarik, Stundlova, Fet & Stahlavsky, 2019
- Alpiscorpius dinaricus (Caporiacco, 1950)
- Alpiscorpius gamma (Caporiaco, 1950)
- Alpiscorpius germanus (C.L. Koch, 1837)
- Alpiscorpius hakani (Tropea & Yağmur, 2016)
- Alpiscorpius honazicus (Tropea et al., 2016)
- Alpiscorpius huyukensis Yagmur, 2025
- Alpiscorpius idaeus (Yağmur & Tropea, 2017)
- Alpiscorpius istanbulensis Tropea, Yağmur & Parmakelis, 2024
- Alpiscorpius kappa Kovarik, Stundlova, Fet & Stahlavsky, 2019
- Alpiscorpius karamani Tropea, 2021
- Alpiscorpius lambda Kovarik, Stundlova, Fet & Stahlavsky, 2019
- Alpiscorpius liburnicus Tvrtković & Rebrina, 2022
- Alpiscorpius mingrelicus (Kessler, 1874)
- Alpiscorpius omega Kovarik, Stundlova, Fet & Stahlavsky, 2019
- Alpiscorpius omikron Kovarik, Stundlova, Fet & Stahlavsky, 2019
- Alpiscorpius orgeli Yağmur, 2024
- Alpiscorpius pavicevici Tropea, 2021
- Alpiscorpius phrygius (Bonacina, 1980)
- Alpiscorpius sigma Kovarik, Stundlova, Fet & Stahlavsky, 2019
- Alpiscorpius sultanensis (Tropea & Yagmur, 2016)
- Alpiscorpius tropeai Yagmur, 2025
- Alpiscorpius uludagensis (Lacroix, 1995)
- Alpiscorpius victori Yağmur, 2025
- Alpiscorpius ypsilon Kovarik, Stundlova, Fet & Stahlavsky, 2019
- Alpiscorpius zloporubovici Tropea, 2021
