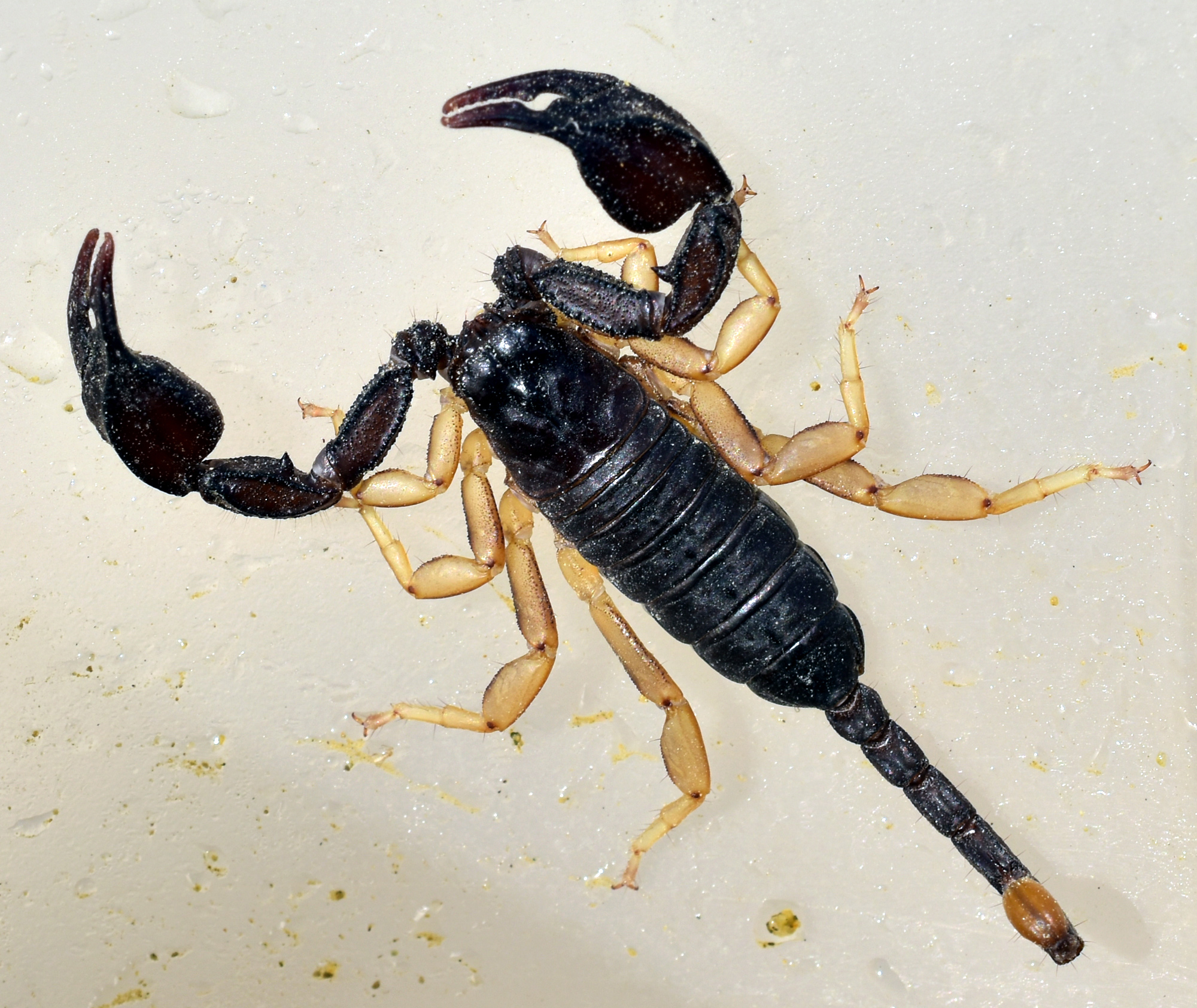

Scientific classification
- Kingdom: Animalia
- Phylum: Arthropoda
- Subphylum: Chelicerata
- Class: Arachnida
- Order: Scorpiones
- Family: Euscorpiidae
- Genus: Tetratrichobothrius
- Species: T. flavicaudis

Binomial name
- Tetratrichobothrius flavicaudis (De Geer, 1778)

Synonyms
- Euscorpius flavicaudis (De Geer, 1778)

= Tetratrichobothrius flavicaudis =

Species of scorpion

Tetratrichobothrius flavicaudis, or the European yellow-tailed scorpion, is a small black scorpion with yellow-brown legs and tail (metasoma). Adults measure about 35–45 mm (1 2/5–1 4/5 in) long. It has relatively large, strong claws (pedipalps) and a short, thin tail. It is native to Southern Europe and Northwest Africa, but there is an introduced population in the United Kingdom.

== Distribution ==
The native range of Tetratrichobothrius flavicaudis extends through Northwest Africa and Southern Europe, but it has also been accidentally introduced into the United Kingdom at Sheerness Dockyard on the Isle of Sheppey, Kent, and parts of east London. The introduction is thought to have taken place in the early 19th century via a shipment of Italian masonry. The resulting colony, numbering 10,000 to 15,000 individuals in 2013, is the northernmost population of scorpions outside the Americas.

== Habitat ==
In warm temperate climates, this species can be found in built-up areas. In the UK, the scorpion occupies cracks and holes in walls where the mortar pointing has crumbled away.

== Venom ==
It is a mildly venomous scorpion, which rarely uses its stinger. Its sting is less painful than a bee sting to humans.

== Reproduction ==
The gestation period is 10–14 months, depending on the availability of food and the prevalent climate.

After union with the male, a pregnant female looks for a secluded, humid place to give birth to live young, from a few to about 30, which are white, soft, and swollen. The mother raises her forelegs to facilitate the release of the young, which then climb onto her back, where they remain until the first moult (about 6 days). After that, the young start to wander around the surrounding area, but remain together close to the hiding place for a few days. The young scorpions reach adulthood after 1–2 years.

== Feeding ==
Tetratrichobothrius flavicaudis is an ambush predator, lying motionless at the entrance to its lair, but moving quickly to capture prey that wanders by. The main prey of T. flavicaudis are woodlice, although most small insects are taken. Cannibalism has been noted in colonies of T. flavicaudis. Thanks to their low metabolic rate these scorpions may go for long periods of time without food and subsist on as few as four or five woodlice per year.
