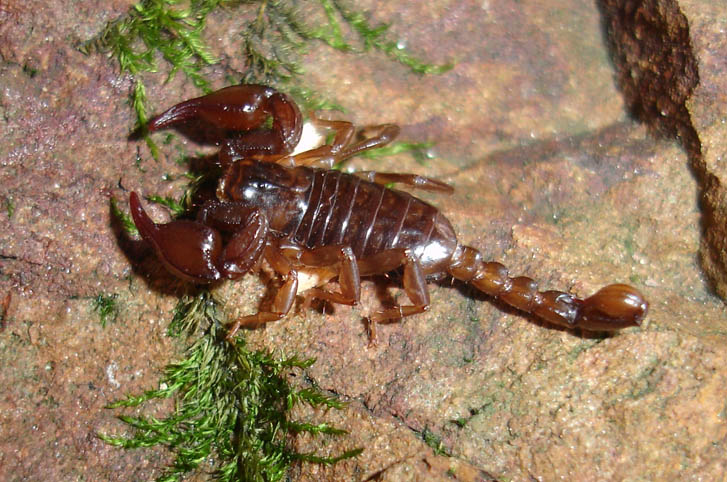

Scientific classification
- Kingdom: Animalia
- Phylum: Arthropoda
- Subphylum: Chelicerata
- Class: Arachnida
- Order: Scorpiones
- Family: Euscorpiidae
- Genus: Alpiscorpius
- Species: A. mingrelicus

Binomial name
- Alpiscorpius mingrelicus (Kessler, 1874)

Synonyms
- Euscorpius mingrelicus (Kessler, 1874)

= Alpiscorpius mingrelicus =

Species of scorpion

Alpiscorpius mingrelicus are scorpions formerly classified in the family Chactidae. They're named after the Georgian region of Mingrelia.

== Description ==
Alpiscorpius mingrelicus individuals are dark in colour and reach lengths of 38 mm. They are difficult to distinguish from other Alpiscorpius spp. such as A. gamma and A. germanus. This species' biology is not well known. Their venom is believed to be mild, with local effects only.

== Distribution and habitat ==
Alpiscorpius mingrelicus is distributed through Anatolia (including Turkey, Syria, and Georgia) and Eastern Europe, with populations from Russia to Italy. This species' full distribution is uncertain, owing in part to possible misidentifications. They are found in humid, mountainous areas and forests, and have been reported in Austrian river valleys. A. mingrelicus may hide under stones and other objects, such as logs or beneath the bark of dead trees.
