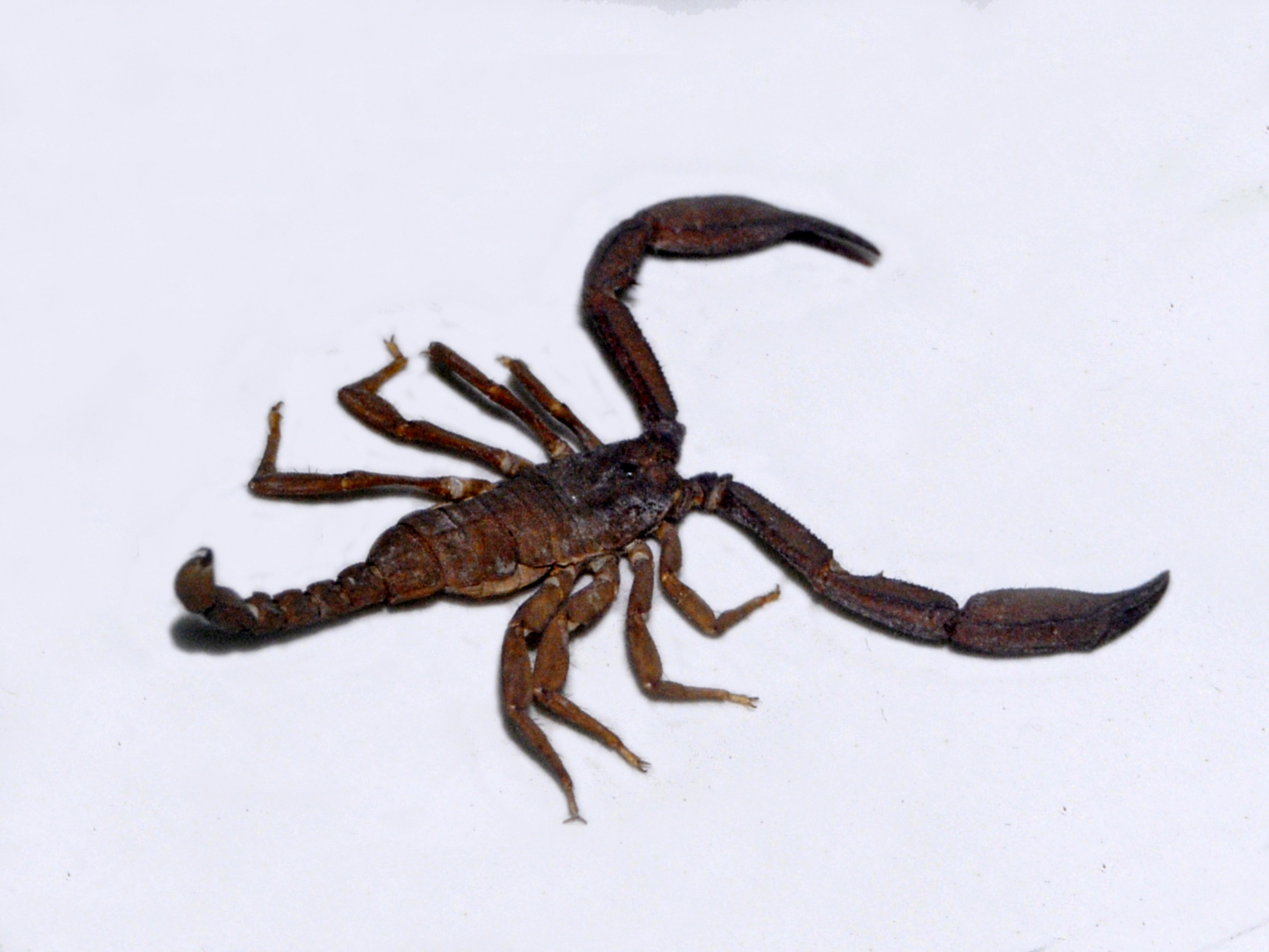
- Museum specimen of Euscorpiops montanus

Scientific classification
- Kingdom: Animalia
- Phylum: Arthropoda
- Subphylum: Chelicerata
- Class: Arachnida
- Order: Scorpiones
- Superfamily: Chactoidea
- Family: Euscorpiidae; Laurie, 1896

= Euscorpiidae =

Euscorpiidae Temporal range: Paleogene–present

Family of scorpions

The Euscorpiidae are a family of scorpions.

== Genera ==
Euscorpiidae contains the following six genera:

- Alpiscorpius Gantenbein et al., 1999
- Euscorpius Thorell, 1876
- Megacormus Karsch, 1881
- Plesiochactas Pocock, 1900
- Tetratrichobothrius Birula, 1917
- Troglocormus Francke, 1981
