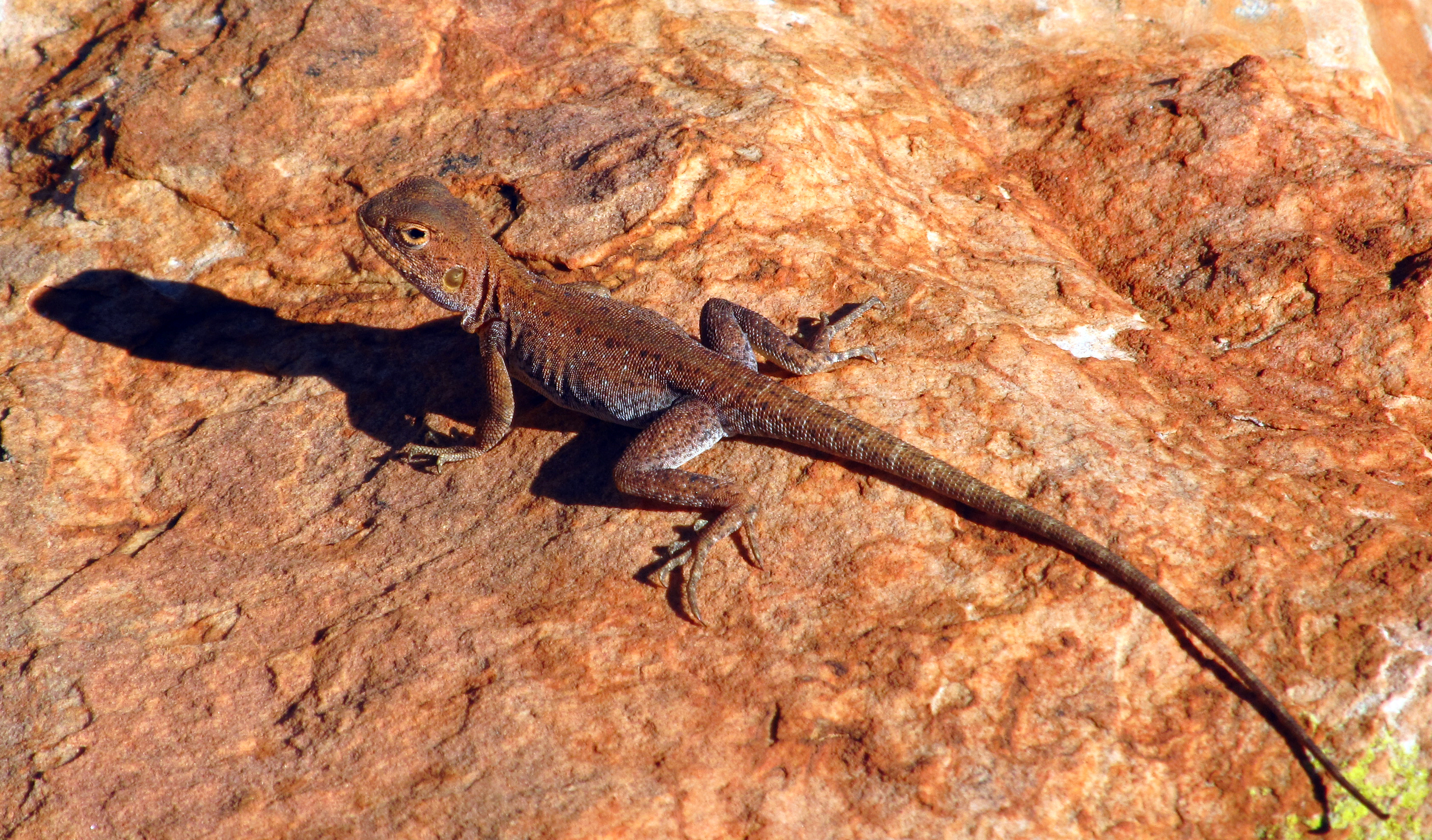

Conservation status
- Least Concern (IUCN 3.1)

Scientific classification
- Kingdom: Animalia
- Phylum: Chordata
- Class: Reptilia
- Order: Squamata
- Suborder: Iguania
- Family: Agamidae
- Genus: Ctenophorus
- Species: C. caudicinctus

Binomial name
- Ctenophorus caudicinctus (Günther, 1875)

Synonyms
- Amphibolurus caudicinctus (Günther, 1875); Grammatophora caudicincta (Günther, 1875); Tachyon caudicinctus (Günther, 1875); Amphibolurus imbricatus (Peters, 1876)

= Ctenophorus caudicinctus =

Species of lizard

Ctenophorus caudicinctus, commonly known as the ring-tailed dragon or ring-tailed bicycle-dragon is a native species of agamid lizard occurring in rocky ranges and outcrops of Australia. Ctenophorus caudicinctus is most commonly found in the Pilbara region and offshore islands of Western Australia. The ctenophorus has 28 known species in the northern, southern, and western parts of Australia. It is recognized to be the most speciose group of Australian agamids.

== Description ==
Ctenophorus caudicinctus are recognized for their bright colours, their survival tactics, and sexual dimorphism. Males display brighter colours than females to make themselves more attractive to a mate. The colour of the lizard is also impacted by their age, season, and temperature of their body. The ring-tailed dragon is about 25–35 cm long and is differentiated from other lizards by the line of spines that curves beneath the eyes. The pattern of the ctenophorus caudicinctus can range from a pale beige to dark orange. They have distinctive banding around the tail and a white to yellow underbelly. They have a short crest of nuchal spines that varies in colour.

== Etymology ==
Ctenophorus is the largest genus of lizards in Australia. Ctenephorus comes from Ancient Greek κτείς (kteís), meaning "comb", and φόρος (phóros), meaning "bearing", and caudicinctus means ring-tailed in Latin. Many of these species have been grouped by similar morphology and have been given informal names derived from mythological creatures.

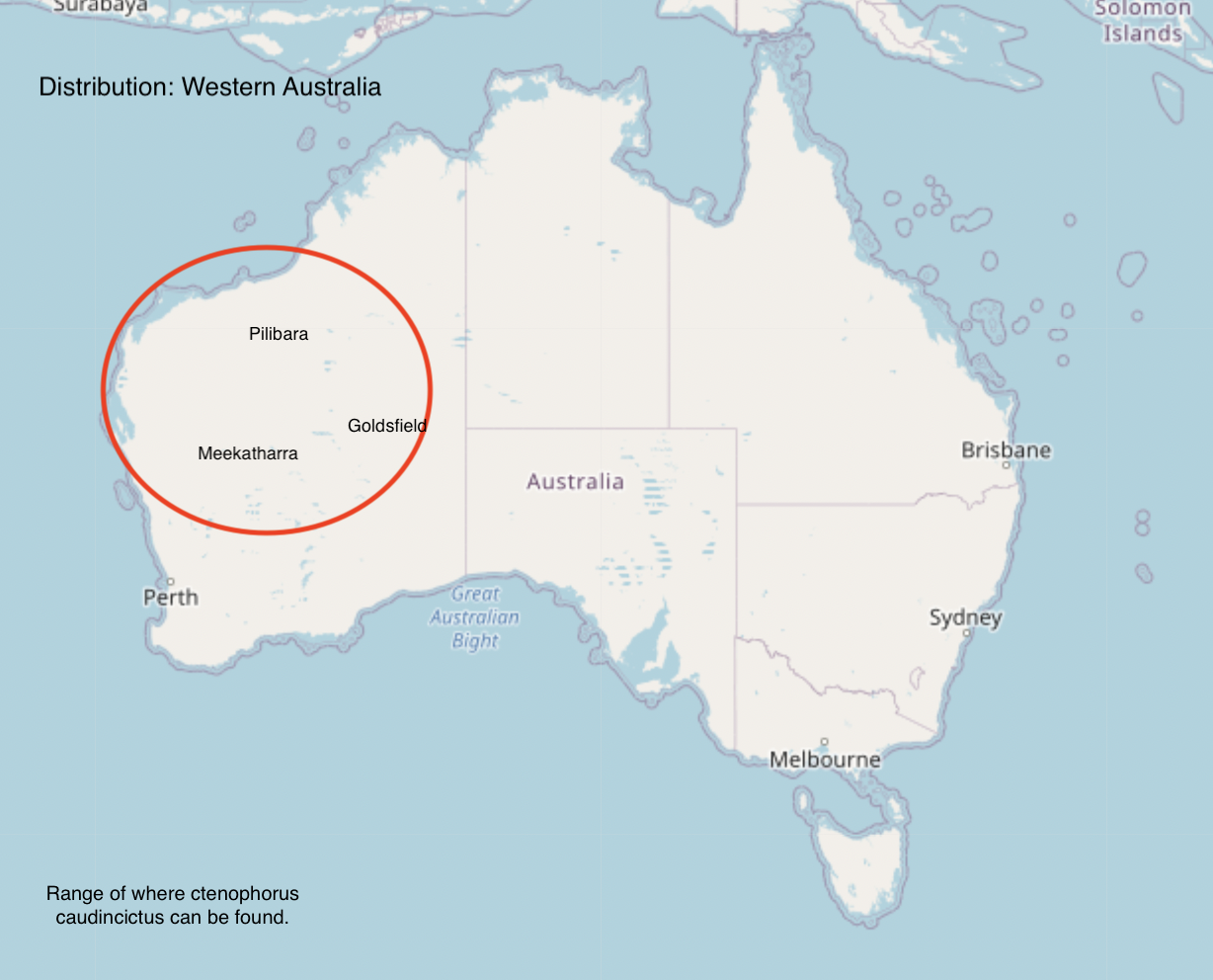
Range of where ctenophorus caudicinctus can be found in Western Australia

== Anatomy ==
=== Excretion ===
The environment in Western Australia where Ctenophorus Caudicinctus is commonly found is arid and dry. Ctneophorus caudicinctus and many other lizards in dry tropics, do not produce hyperosmotic urine. The wall of the colon absorbs water and salts so that the body can retain water to prevent dehydration.

=== Sensory characteristics ===
Ctenophorus caudicinctus has vestibular hearing. The hair cells located in the neuroepithelial structures in the inner ear acts as receptors. They convert mechanical energy by the displacement of their surroundings into electrochemical energy. The displacement of their surroundings are caused by sound waves and they use the balance of their head to perceive their surroundings.

=== Maintenance of water ===
Ctenophorus caudicinctus has scale hinges that overlap each other and it creates an enclosed spaced between the scales. The scale hinges are flexible and able to stretch due to its thin layer of β-keratin in the hinge joint. These scale hinges create a smooth surface texture. The water flows into the mouth and over the scales not between the scales. The purpose of this is to promote cutaneous water transport to the body. It allows water to be absorbed into the deeper layers of the body through capillary action and hinge joint channels.

=== Osmoregulation ===
In spring where there is no breeding, ctenophorus caudicinctus has more sodium and potassium in their plasma and lower water influx and efflux. However, in autumn there is an increase in water metabolism. There are higher water influx and efflux but less sodium and potassium in their body. Their total body water is higher in autumn than in spring. This is due to the mating season and heavy rainfall in autumn. Sodium and potassium content is important because it shows the rehydration or dehydration of any lizard. The nasal salt gland contributes to the potassium excretion for rehydration. Therefore, in autumn ctenophorus caudicinctus is more hydrated than in spring. Osmoregulation is important in lizards because of hormonal control, maintaining bodily functions and survival.

=== Autotomy ===
Most lizards can regrow their tail and they can lose it voluntarily. However, most agamid lizards, including the ctenophorus caudicinctus do not lose their tail. Their tail is very thick compared to other lizards that can regrow their tail. Therefore, it is hard to regenerate if they lose their tail. In addition, ctenophorus caudicinctus uses their tail for balance when they bipedal.

== Evolution ==
Ctenophorus caudicinctus is part of a large genus that shares similar phenotypes. But are still distinct from each other. Ctenophorus is a type of convergent evolution that both the ecological and biological factors that cause the evolution of a species to repeat.

The ctenophorus genera have an evolution rate of approximately 1.3% divergence between lineages per million years of evolutionary separation. This rate of evolution is common in vertebrates because of their rapid reproduction, survival tactics, and natural selection. The ctenophorus has two lineages that arose during the late Miocene and Pliocene. Which caused a separation of species to be separately distributed to Northern and southern parts of Australia. The ancestorial ecology of ctenophorus has features similar to the current day ctenophorus species of rock sheltering, shrub sheltering, and digging. These features are derived from a burrowing ancestor. Through the geographic separation of the original dragons and different climates, the ctenophorus caudicinctus developed their own characteristics for survival.

Plasticity also plays a role in the evolution of the ctenophorus caudicinctus. The ctenophorus can develop phenotypes depending on the environment that they face and have similar morphologies. Ctenophorus caudicinctus has a larger head than other species. They have favourable limb and snout length for hunting resulting in bigger and flatter heads. Along with pressure from predators, they gained relatively long limbs to move more quickly. To manage the heat, the ctenophorus caudicinctus is lighter in colour to absorb less heat.

=== Adaptation ===
The morphology of ctenophorus caudicinctus is highly impacted by their habitat. It lives in rocky ranges, whilst other species live in burrows, with no burrows, and vegetation. Therefore, the bone structure of this species adapts to its surroundings and defers from other species of the ctenophorus. Ctenophorus caudicinctus has a longer and narrower spout to catch its prey and a more flattened body to fit through horizontal spaces.

== Behaviour ==
=== Thermoregulation ===
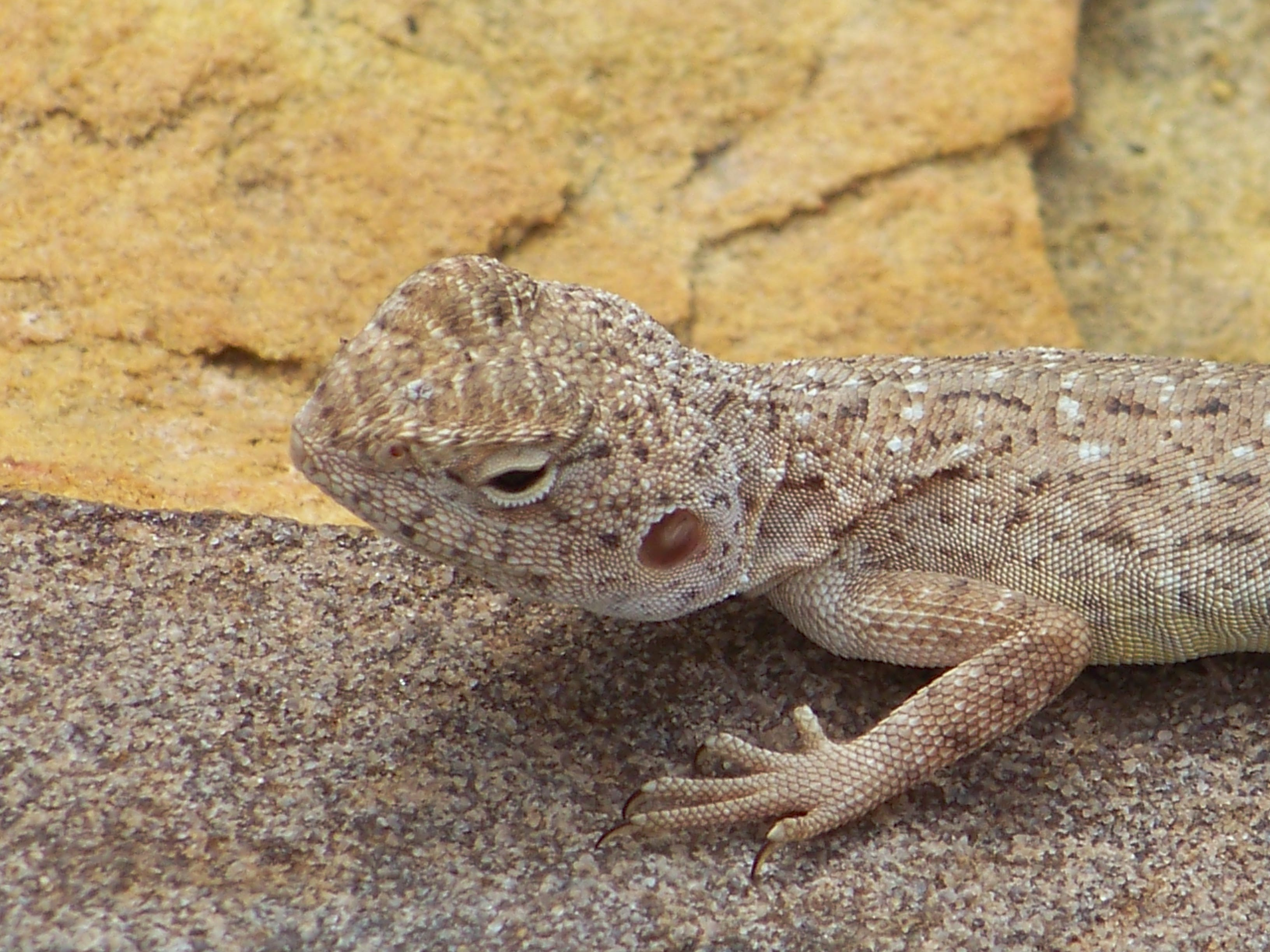
Ctenophorus caudicinctus with pale beige body and spotting.

Thermoregulation behaviour is important for ctenophorus caudicinctus to carry out daily activities. The availability of proper thermal radiation is limited to species like ctenophorus caudicinctus because of extreme seasons. Ctenophorus caudicinctus body temperature in shade is 34.2 7 °C. They start their day on the ground and move higher throughout the day. Then return to the ground at the end of the day. Their body temperatures are mostly kept cool because of higher atmospheres and less absorbance of the sun. If the weather isn't appropriate, ctenophorus caudicinctus can use psychological changes to be active during the day. It can increase their absorbance or loss of heat up to 77–87.7% through changing the colour of their skin. This would help ctenophorus caudicinctus during lower climates like spring and winter to increase their body temperature. Vice versa, they can lower their body temperatures in hotter seasons.

=== Retreat ===
Ctenophorus caudicinctus has highspeed locomotion and retreats to rocks. They have bipedalism and quadrupedalism types of retreat. Ctenophorus caudicinctus is able to be bipedal due to their morphology. Ctneophorus caudicinctus has a narrow body, long hindlimbs, short forelimbs and a long tail. These are adaptations to bipedalism.

=== Communication ===
Ctenophorus caudicinctus communicates with animals and things around them through motion-based signalling. Their motion-based signalling is heavily impacted by their surroundings. They can identify things through the sound, seismic, and colours. They choose to not move to blend into their surroundings to hide from predators. Therefore, their running speed is not as fast as other species in their genera. One of the ways ctenophores caudicinctus communicates with other species is being territorial and use of motor patterns to recognize other species. There are many other lizard species in their habitat that are in their genera. Therefore, the ctenophores caudicinctus' unique behaviour allows them to be able to differentiate their kind from others.

== Ecology ==
=== Habitat ===
Ctenophorus caudicinctus is found in places with low vegetation, rocky and arid. Ctenophorus caudicinctus is highly territorial. They are mostly found in Hameresly ranges in Western Australia, the Pilbara, MacDonnell, James and Musgrave Ranges.

=== Diet ===
Owing to the ctenophorus caudicinctus being a diurnal and saxicolous lizard species living in rocky areas, the species is insectivorous. They consume mostly arthropods, termites and ants. Occasionally they will eat some vegetative material. Termites can be found in large numbers in one spot. Ctenophorus caudicinctus needs to be wary about ant eating lizards. They eat the skin of the ants. Ctenophorus caudicinctus primarily waits for their prey in sheltered rocks and burrows. Ctenophorus caudicinctus are ambush predators. They catch their predators with strategy, rather than attacking.

=== Effects of extreme weathers ===
Ctenophorus caudicinctus does not dig burrows and lives in an arid area. Therefore, it is more difficult to find shelter. Extreme weather conditions such as lightning and heavy storms that can cause fires, often kill them. Periods of limited rainfall can also be the cause of death for lizards. Too much heat causes them to be dehydrated or burns them. The lack of shade and shelter exposes ctneophorus caudicinctus to these harsh environments.

=== Predators ===
Ctenophorus caudicinctus is high in abundance and has very few predators. Therefore, they are not an endangered species. Their main predators are snakes, dugites and pythons.

=== Parasites ===
Ctenophorus caudicinctus has a symbiotic relationship with skrjabinoptera phrynosoma. It is stomach parasite and their hosts are commonly lizards.

== Reproduction ==
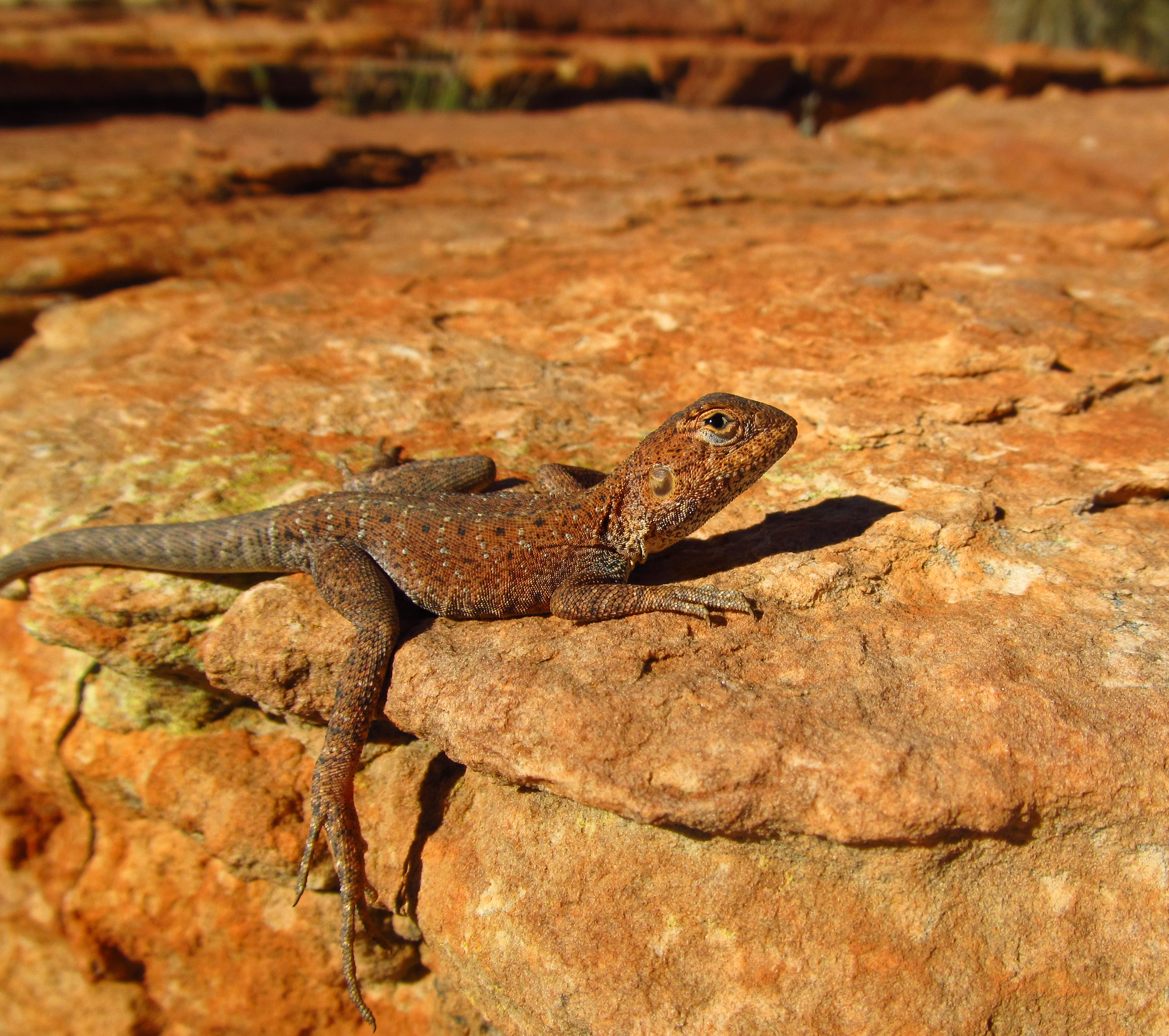
Red-brown coloured ctenophorus caudicinctus

The ring tailed dragon's reproductive cycle favours conditions that are best for their survival and growth. Thus, reproductive cycles vary over the years due to rainfall and the availability of food. Most commonly, ctenophorus caudicinctus breeds during spring, September to October. Then in the following months of winter, there is winter rainfall. This rainfall is important as it stimulates insect abundance to provide abundant food for ctenophorus caudicinctus. Adequate food helps with fertilization, spermatogenesis, and healthy reproduction. For males, the main season for spermiogenesis is from February to August as this when they generate the maximum amount of sperm and conditions are optimal for breeding. However, some males do not mate until they are matured. They would hold it in until the next mating season. Ctenophorus caudicinctus is oviparous. The number of offspring is lesser than the number of eggs produced because of a lack of maternal protection.

=== Physical attributes in mating ===
Physical attributes also impact how males and females mate. Males have bigger heads to assert dominance and win intrasexual competitions. In addition, colour plays an important role. During mating season, males change colour adopting yellow markings on the flanks, and a dark chest patch. The yellow colour emphasizes the banding on their tails. However, they lose their original camouflage and this makes them easier to be caught by predators. Bright colours and the pattern of their body makes the males more attractive. Most females have a single coloured pattern over their body, whereas males have more complex colour patterns.

=== Brain structure and sexual selection ===
Ctenophorus caudicinctus has two regions in the brain that regulate sexual behaviour. These regions are the medial preoptic nucleus (MPON), which controls male reproductive behaviour, and the ventromedial hypothalamic nucleus (VMN), which controls the female reproductive behaviour and is involved in male aggression. Males have larger MPON and smaller VMN. In females they have similar MPON and VMN. The volumes of both these vertebrae are correlated to their brain volume and differ from one lizard to another.

== Conservation status ==
It is highly abundant and has no conservation significance. Ctenophorus caudicinctus are assessed as being of the least concern in the Nature Conservation Act 1992 (NCA).

== Subspecies ==
Ctenophorus caudicinctus has two subspecies:

- Ctenophorus caudicinctus caudicinctus
- Ctenophorus caudicinctus mensarum
- Ctenophorus caudicinctus macropus
- Ctenophorus caudicinctus slateri
- Ctenophorus caudicinctus graafi

The subspecies of Ctenophorus caudicinctus all have the same band pattern and vary in the number of spotting and colour. Some are brighter more vibrant colours like green and red. However, Ctenophorus caudicinctus is composed of brown and dark red colours to blend into the rocky habitat.
