= Skrjabinoptera phrynosoma =

Scientific classification
- Kingdom: Animalia
- Phylum: Nematoda
- Class: Secernentea
- Order: Spirurida
- Family: Physalopteridae
- Genus: Skrjabinoptera
- Species: S. phrynosoma

Binomial name
- Skrjabinoptera phrynosoma (Ortlepp, 1922) Schulz, 1927

Synonyms
- Physaloptera phrynosoma Ortlepp, 1922

Species of roundworm

Skrjabinoptera phrynosoma is a parasitic worm in the phylum Nematoda, the most diverse of pseudocoelomates. Like many other parasites, the life cycle of S. phrynosoma is complicated and it involves two hosts – a lizard (e.g.: the desert horned lizard Phrynosoma platyrhinos or the Texas horned lizard Phrynosoma cornutum) and an ant.

The interesting aspect of the life cycle of S. phrynosoma is that the parasitic worm adjusts its life cycle to that of both the ant and the lizard. During the middle of the mating season of the desert horned lizard Phrynosoma platyrhinos, the female worm is already filled with the greatest number of eggs it can contain in itself. At the same time, the number of the ants actively hunting for food reach peak abundance. Also, this is the time when the ant colonies are busy with developing ant larvae. S. phrynosoma takes advantage of these active periods of the two hosts' life cycle and spread their offspring successfully.

== Life cycle ==
The fully developed S. phrynosoma lives inside the stomach of P. platyrhinos and mating occurs there as well. Once filled with mature eggs, the female travels to the lizard's cloaca. Another unique aspect of the life cycle of S. phrynosoma is that it does not just lay eggs that are cast out of the lizard and left alone exposed to other elements. S. phrynosoma cares so much about their offspring that the female devotes herself for the safety of the eggs by casting her body filled with eggs out of the lizard through its feces. Once outside the host, the female worm dies with the eggs inside her. This also helps her eggs reach the next host – the ant. The ant finds the dead body filled with eggs and use it to feed its brood of growing larvae. Then the larvae of S. phrynosoma infects the ant larvae, which results in pre-infected worker ant upon maturation. Then the pre-infected worker ants emerge from the colony and are consumed by P. platyrhinos that just came out of hibernation.
