= Northern desert horned lizard =

Scientific classification
- Kingdom: Animalia
- Phylum: Chordata
- Order: Squamata
- Suborder: Iguania
- Family: Phrynosomatidae
- Genus: Phrynosoma
- Species: P. platyrhinos
- Subspecies: P. p. platyrhinos

Trinomial name
- Phrynosoma platyrhinos platyrhinos Girard, 1852

Subspecies of lizard

The northern desert horned lizard (Phrynosoma platyrhinos platyrhinos) is a subspecies of the desert horned lizard, along with the southern desert horned lizard (P. p. calidiarum). It is often referred to as a "horny toad" due to its wide body and blunt snout, but it is not a toad.

== Description ==
It ranges in size between 2.5 and 3.8 in (6.4 and 9.7 cm) from snout to cloaca, and can get to 5.5 in (14 cm) long including the tail. Like all horned lizards, it features horns on the back of its head and sharp scales on its back. Its color typically varies depending on the local environment, ranging from shades of red, brown, gray, and tan to match the color of the soil and/or rocks in which it resides. Adult males are typically smaller than females. It usually has a flat, ovulate body to avoid prey seeing its shadow.

== Diet ==
Its diet mostly consists of ants, which are believed to help with its ability to produce blood from vessels near its eyes, but it eats other insects and invertebrates, as well. Its typical hunting method involves digging itself into the sand, leaving only its head exposed, and waiting for prey to pass by. However, it occasionally eat small plant matter and berries.

== Behavior ==
It often basks in the sun in the morning and evening. When threatened, the lizard can shoot blood out of the corners of its eyes. However, this is mainly used in desperate emergencies, else it will try to run to the nearest bush it can find, dive in a rodent's burrow, or bury/shuffle into the sand like a shovel. If it is grabbed, it will swell, hiss, stab with its horns, and try to bite. If further provocation occurs, the blood-squirting starts.

== Geographic distribution ==
P. p. platyrhinos is native to the Great Basin Desert area of North America. It occurs primarily in Nevada, where its range covers most of the state, but its territory also extends into parts of Idaho, Utah, and Oregon.
