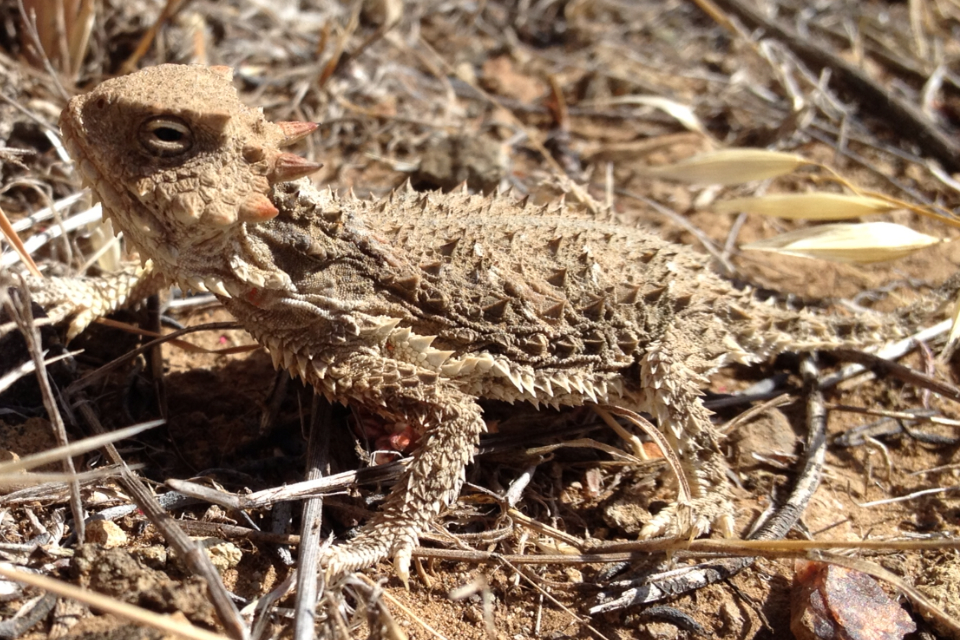

Conservation status
- Least Concern (IUCN 3.1)
- CITES Appendix II

Scientific classification
- Kingdom: Animalia
- Phylum: Chordata
- Class: Reptilia
- Order: Squamata
- Suborder: Iguania
- Family: Phrynosomatidae
- Genus: Phrynosoma
- Species: P. platyrhinos

Binomial name
- Phrynosoma platyrhinos Girard, 1852

= Desert horned lizard =

Species of lizard

The desert horned lizard (Phrynosoma platyrhinos) is a species of phrynosomatid lizard native to western North America. They are often referred to as "horny toads", although they are not toads, but lizards.

== Distribution ==
They typically range from southern Idaho in the north to northern Mexico in the south. These lizards can generally be found in areas with desert climates throughout western North America.

Changes in the environment due to climate change can trigger shifts in the geographic ranges of animals. Phrynosoma platyrhinos has experienced some changes after the Last Glacial Maximum (LGM) which ended approximately 21,000 years ago. The end of the LGM resulted in the expansion of deserts throughout western North America, and with that expansion Phrynsoma platyrhinos had more areas suitable for them to live in. At the end of the LGM P. platyrhinos was able to expand north into the Great Basin, which is now part of their current geographical range.

== Subspecies ==
There are two subspecies which are found in a different geographic ranges: the northern desert horned lizard (Phrynosoma platyrhinos platyrhinos) ranging in Idaho, Wyoming, Utah, Nevada, the Colorado front range, and parts of southeastern Oregon; and the southern desert horned lizard (Phrynosoma platyrhinos calidiarum) ranging in southern Utah and Nevada to southeast California, western Arizona, and northern Baja California.

== Description ==
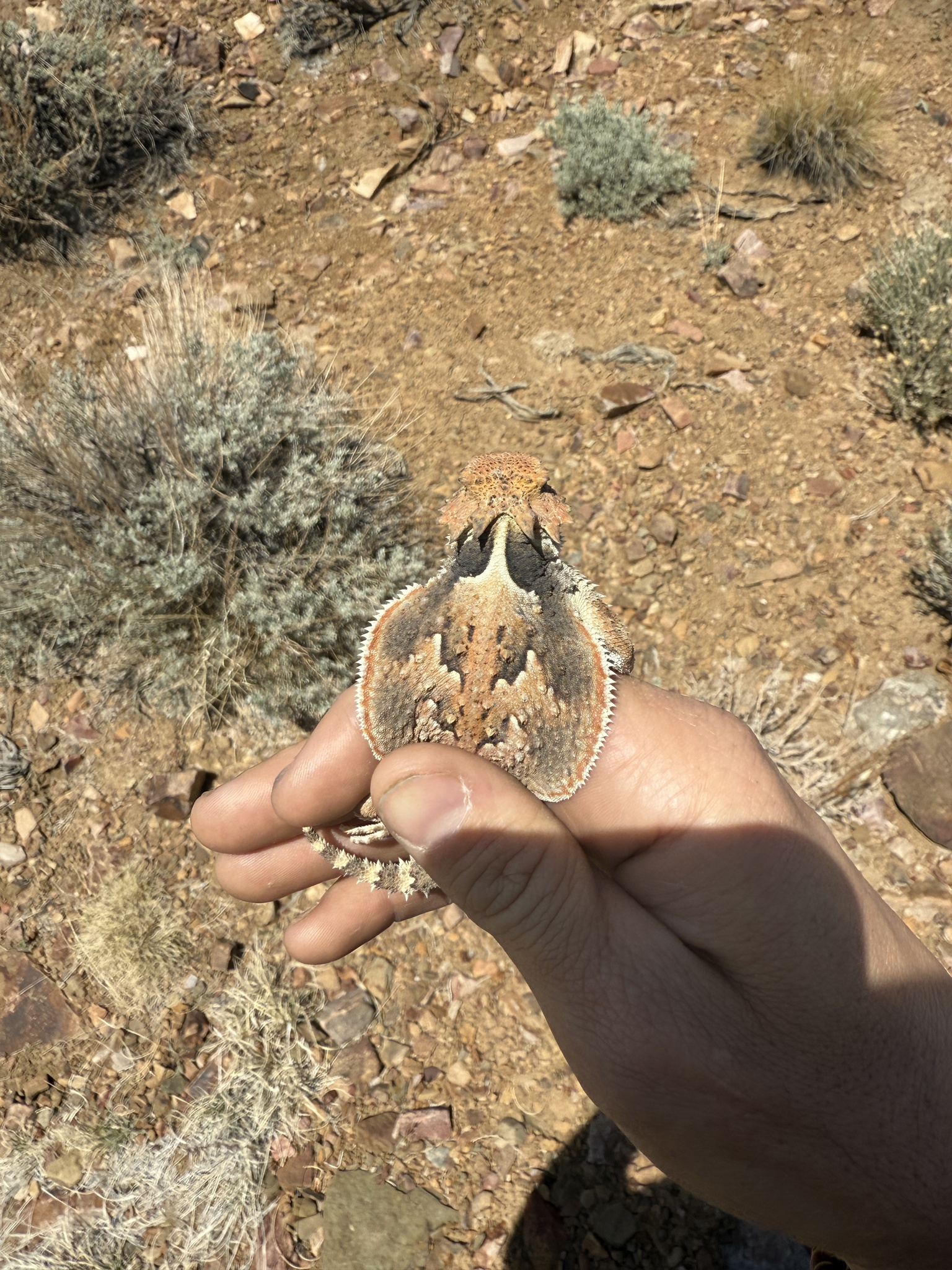
Showing size, at Inyo County, California

There are several important characteristics that can be used to identify desert horned lizards from other horned lizards. Horned lizards can be distinguished from other lizards by the large pointed scales that protrude from the back of their heads, giving them the appearance of having horns, as well as the flat and broad shape of their bodies.

This species of lizard has a distinctive flat body with one row of fringe scales down the sides. They are a medium sized lizard and can grow up to approximately 3.75 inches (95 mm) in size. They have one row of slightly enlarged scales on each side of the throat. Colours can vary and generally blend in with the color of the surrounding soil, but they usually have a beige, tan, or reddish dorsum with contrasting, wavy blotches of darker color. They have two dark blotches on the neck that are very prominent and are bordered posteriorly by a light white or grey color. They also have scattered pointed scales and other irregular dark blotches along the dorsum of their body. Unlike other horned lizards, Phrynosoma platyrhinos individuals do not have a prominent dorsal stripe. Their dorsal stripe can appear faintly or be entirely absent depending on the individual. They also have pointed scales on the dorsum (back) of the body. Juveniles are similar to adults, but have shorter and less-pronounced cranial spines. Desert horned lizards have horns that are wide at the base, which is not true for their congener, the short-horned lizard.

Pictured to the left is Blainville's Horned Lizard (Phrynosoma blainvillii), note the colored horns and double row of fringed scales alongside the body. The desert horned lizards' horns also do not come into contact with one another at the base.

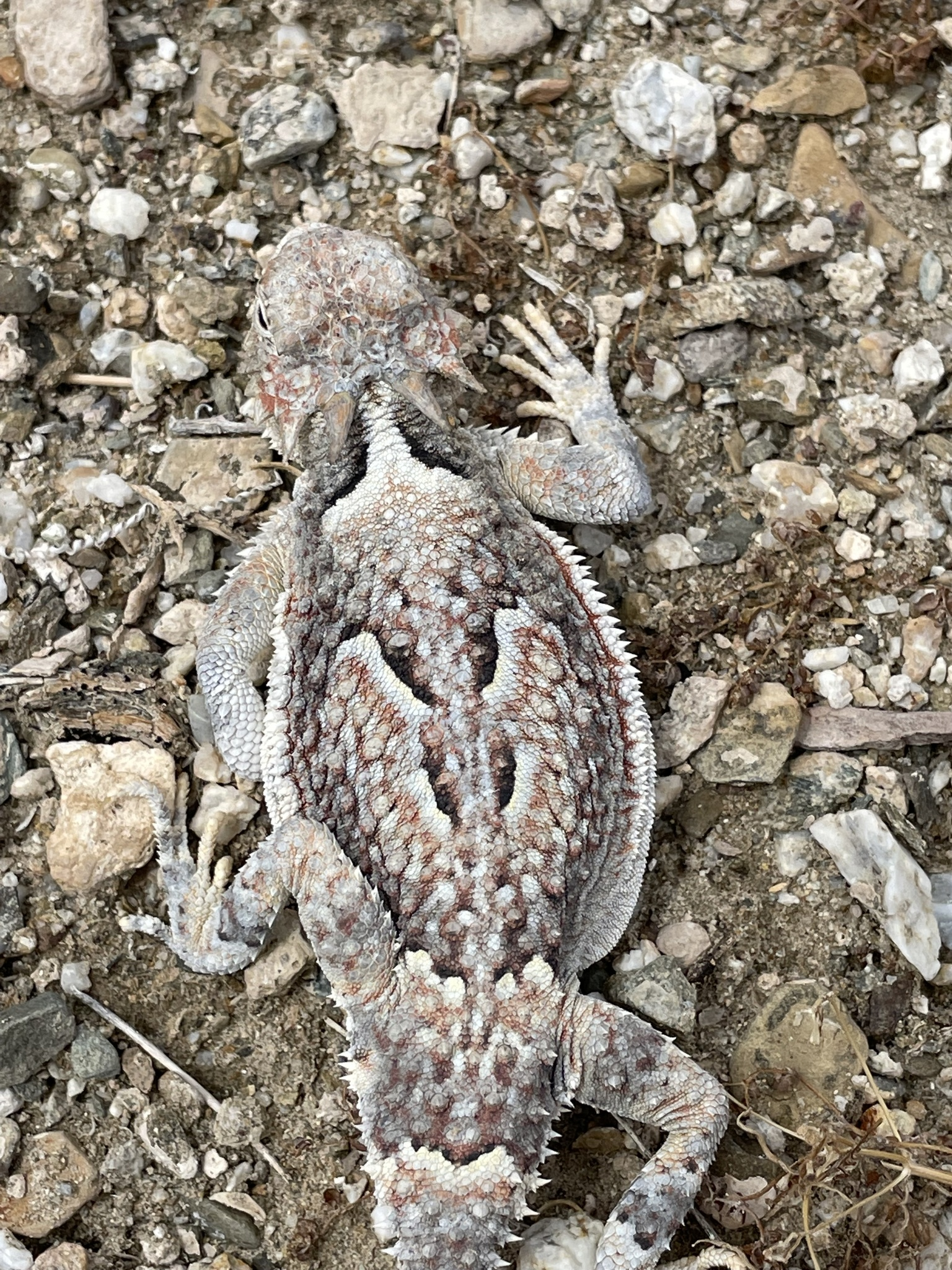

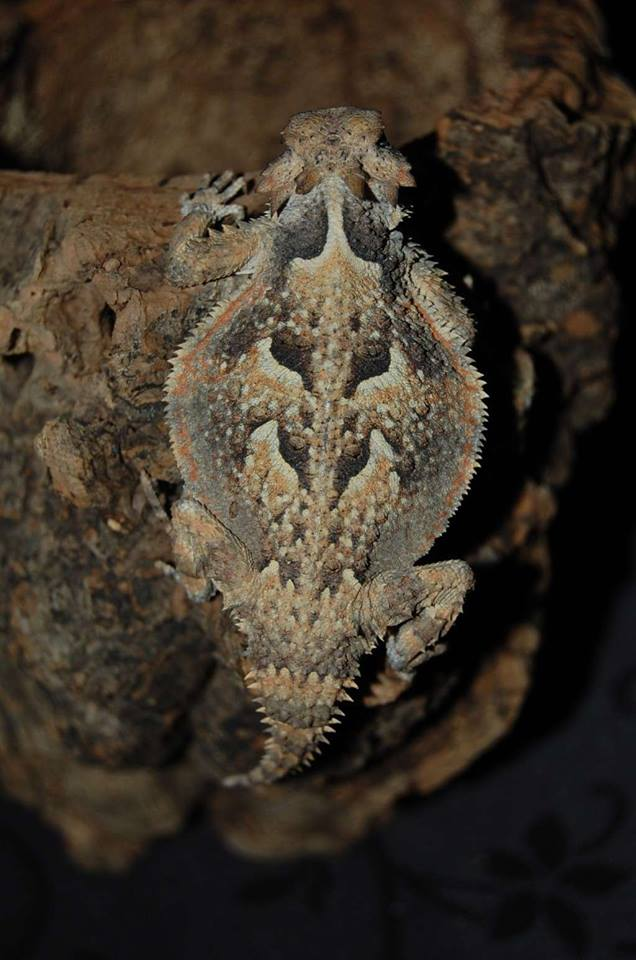

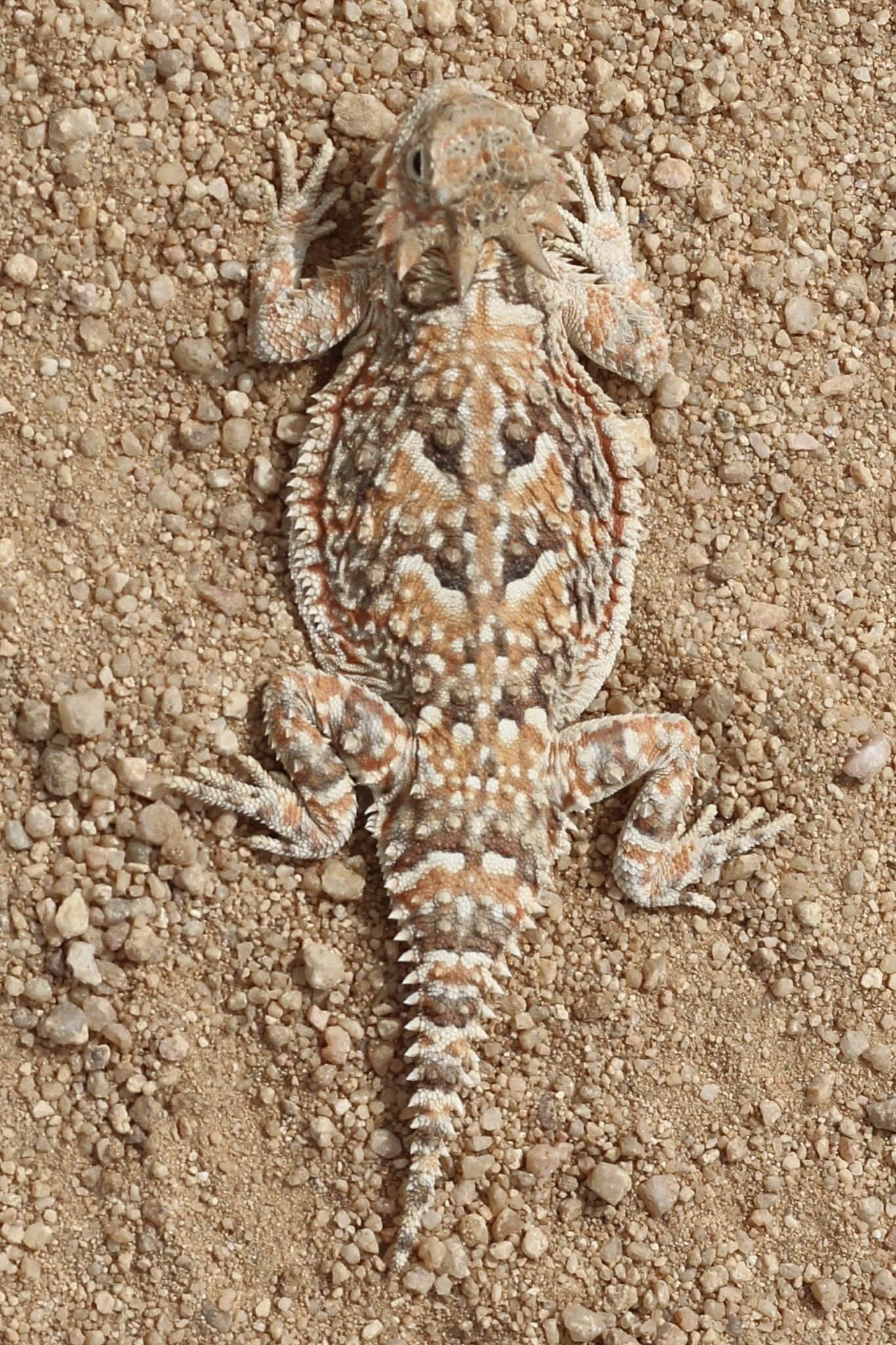
At Kern County, California

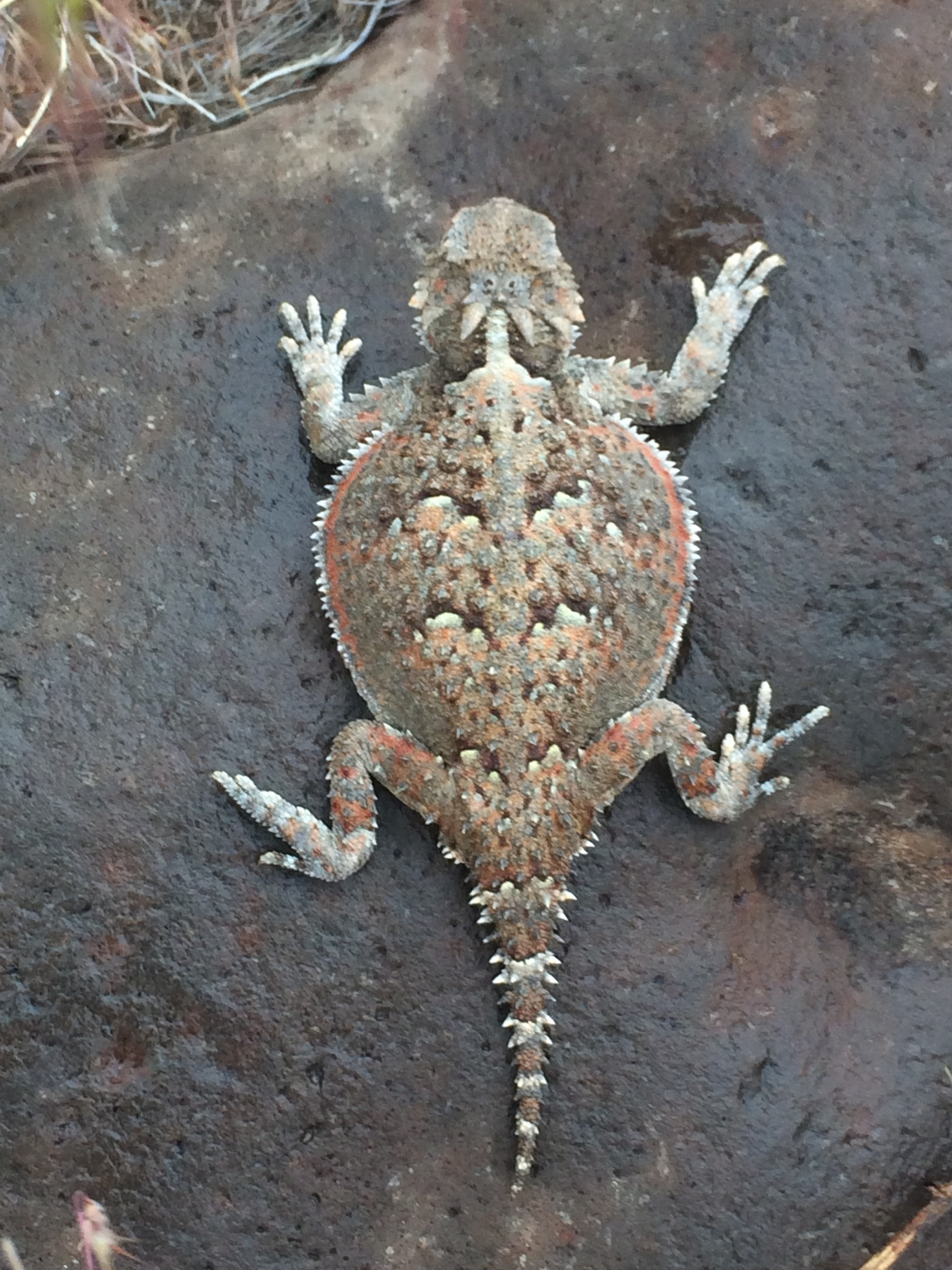
At Washoe County, Nevada

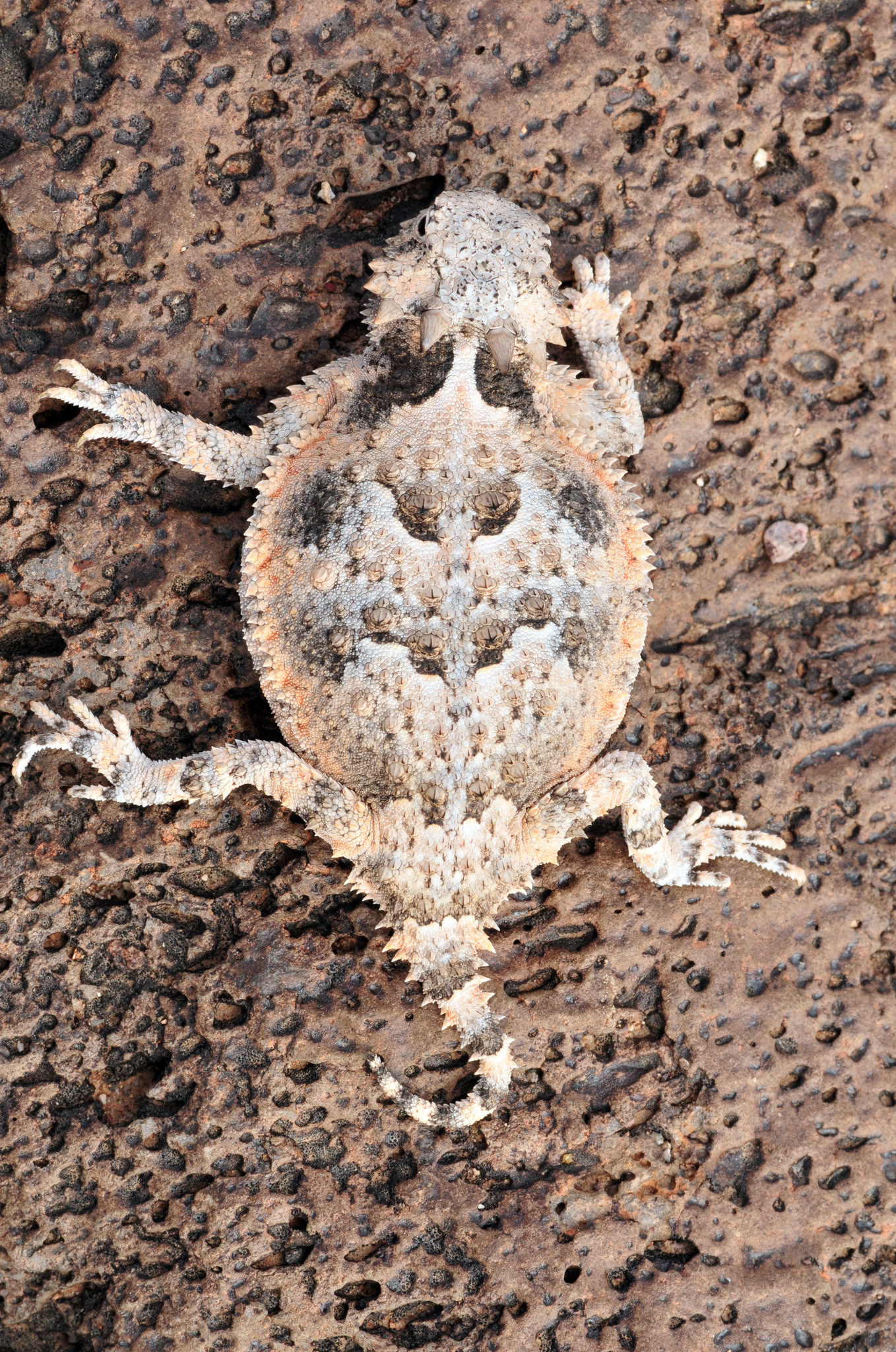
At La Paz County, Arizona

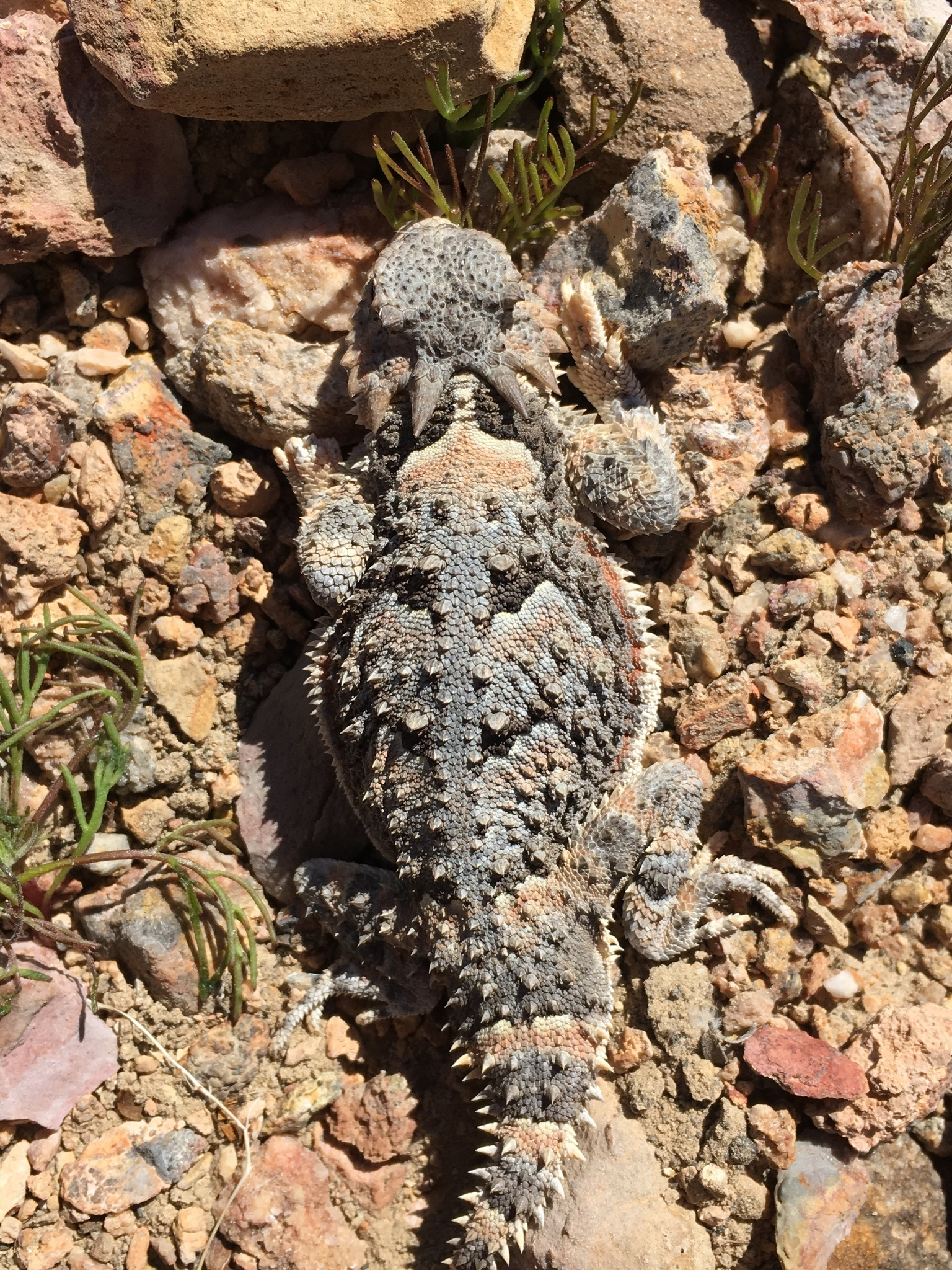
At Death Valley National Park, California

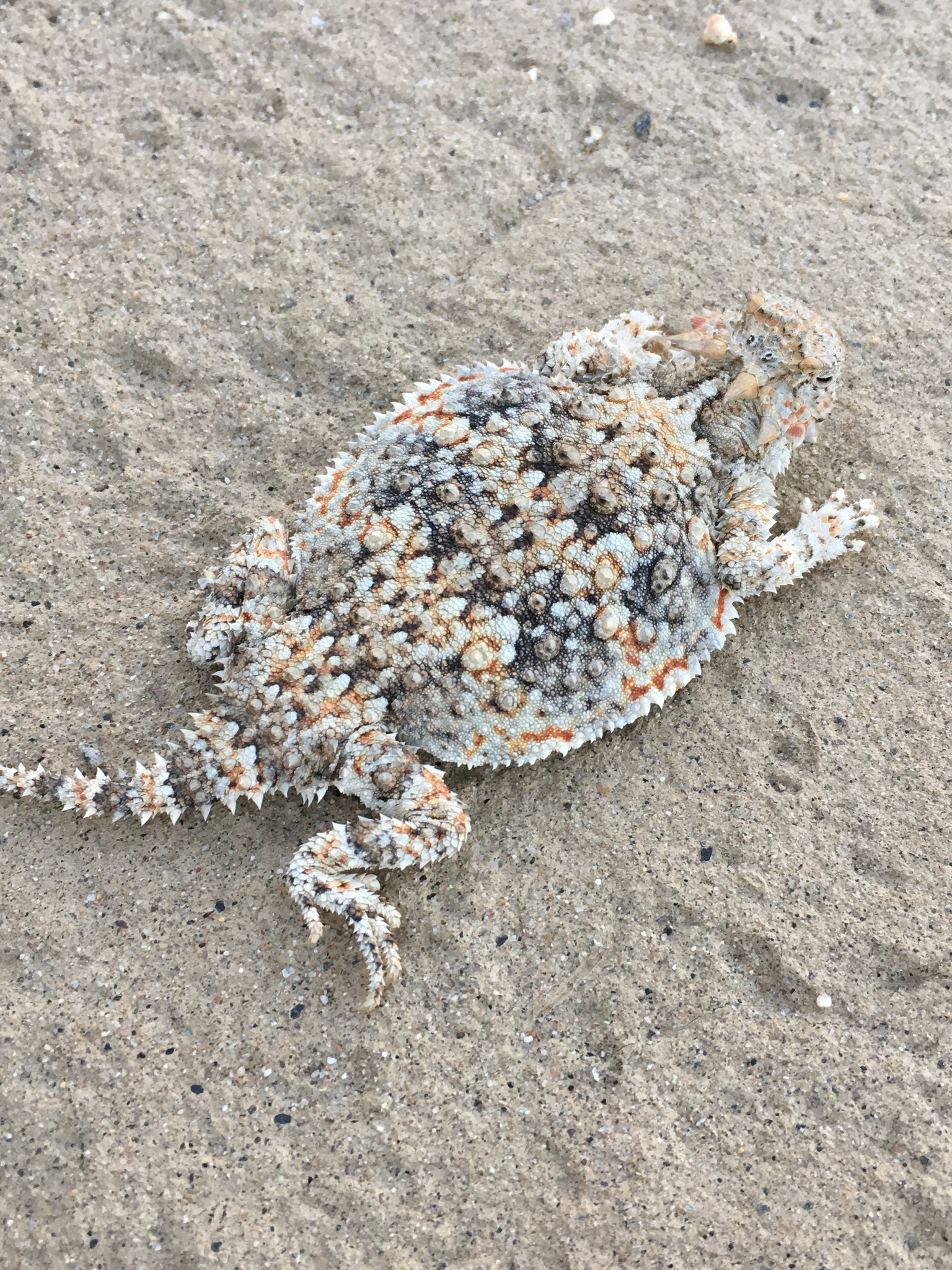
At San Diego County, California

== Diet ==
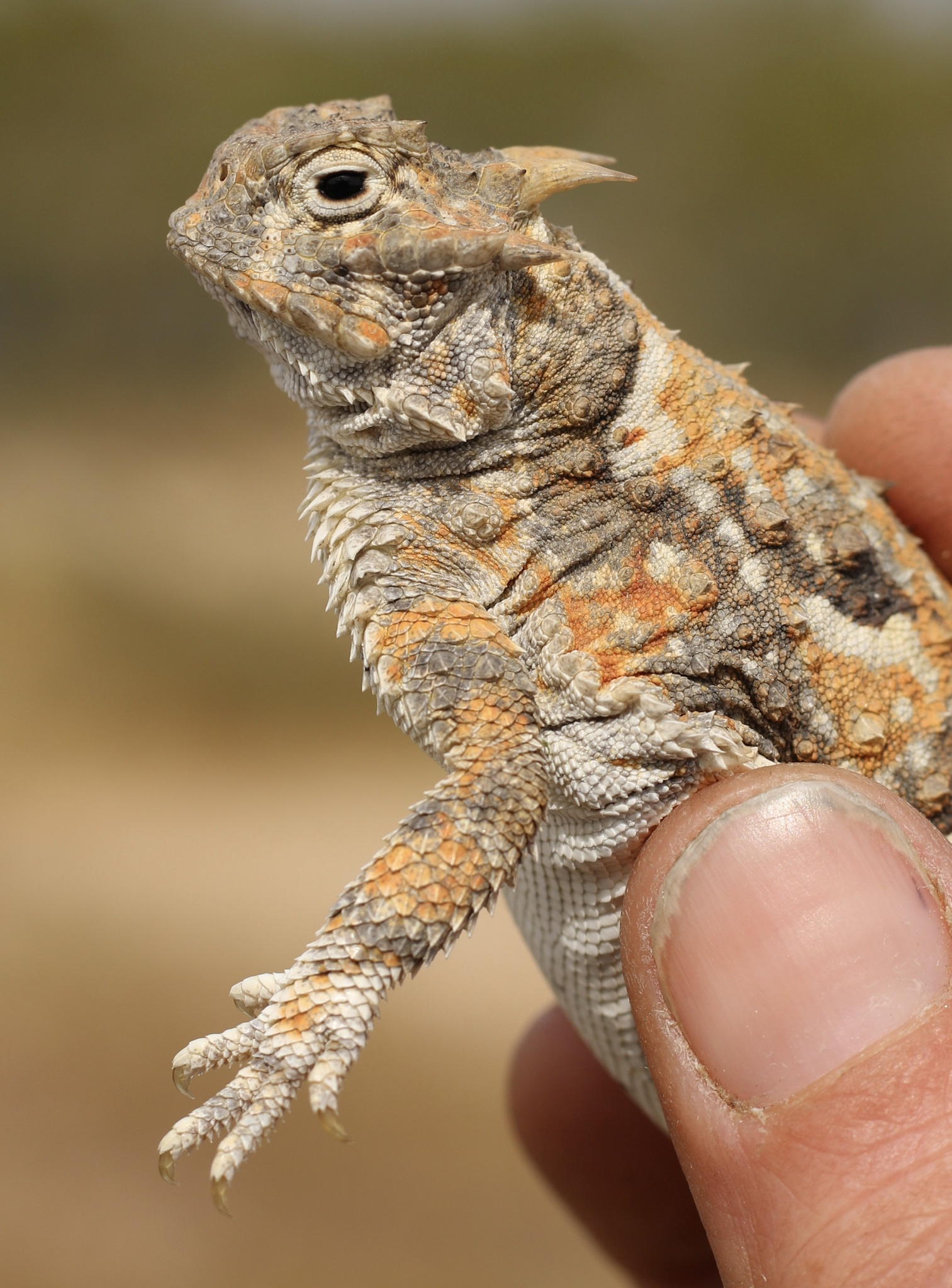
Closeup, at Kern County, California

Desert horned lizards prey primarily on invertebrates, such as ants (including red harvester ants,) crickets, grasshoppers, beetles, worms, flies, ladybugs, meal worms and some plant material. They can often be found in the vicinity of ant hills, where they sit and wait for ants to pass by. Ants contain a large amount of chitin, an indigestible compound, this makes them not as nutrient rich, so larger amounts must be consumed to sustain Phrynosoma platyrhinos. As an evolutionary advantage desert horned lizards developed larger stomachs to allow them to consume larger concentrations of ants. When they find an area of soft sand, they usually shake themselves vigorously, throwing sand over their backs and leaving only their head exposed. This allows them to hide from predators and await their unsuspecting prey.

== Habitat ==
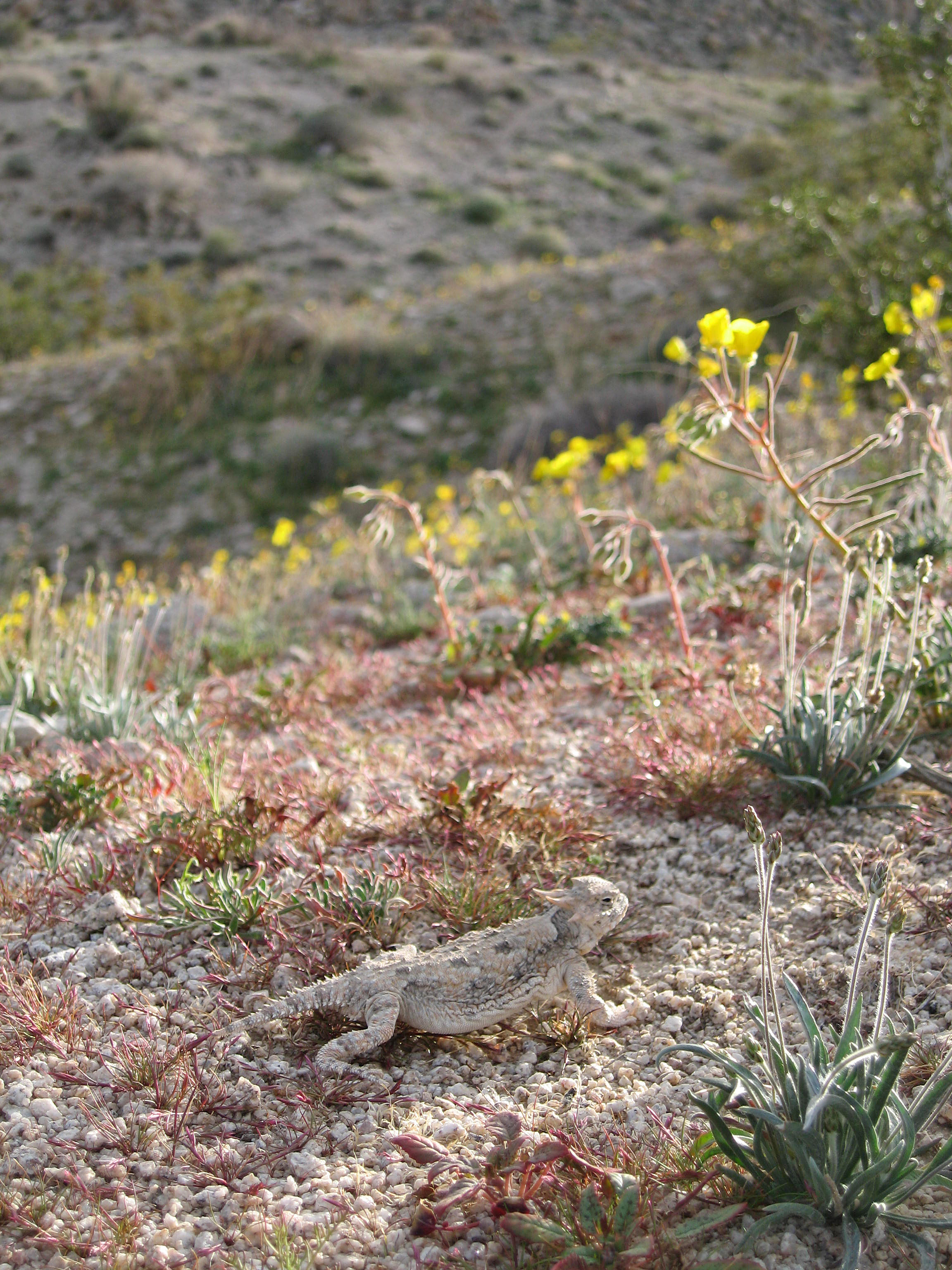
At Joshua Tree National Park

Found in extremely diverse habitats. The flat-tailed horned lizard occurs in areas of fine sand, while the short-horned lizard (P. douglasii) is found in shortgrass prairie all the way up into spruce-fir forest. The most common species in the Arizona Upland subdivision is the regal horned lizard (P. solare), which frequents rocky or gravelly habitats of arid to semiarid plains, hills and lower mountain slopes. The desert horned lizard (P. platyrhinos) is found mostly in the Sonoran and Mojave deserts. It can be found in southeastern Oregon, California, western Arizona Utah, Idaho and Nevada. Outside of the United States it is found in Mexico, northwestern Sonora, and northeastern Baja California. They have a preference for places that they can find shrub covering with an understory. Phrynosoma platyrhinos will often bury themselves in sand soil, if possible, or they will live in burrows that were constructed by other animals.

== Behavior ==
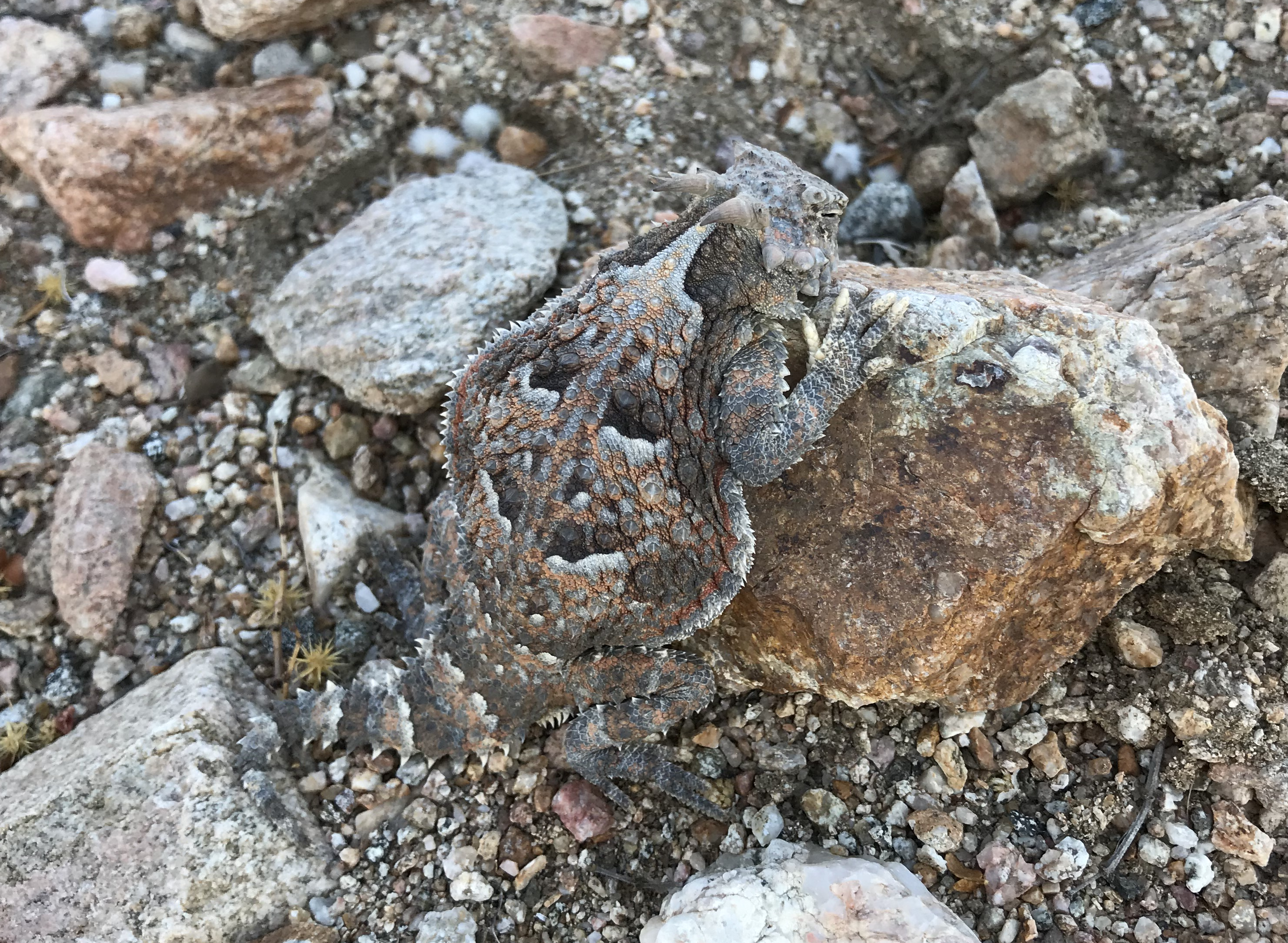
Sunning while blending into its environment

They are generally a gentle species, but have been known to try to push their cranial spines into the hand while held. When excited, they puff themselves up with air, similar to the way a Chuckwalla does, making themselves look bigger. If spotted near a bush, they will dash into it in an attempt to find cover from any threat. Unlike most other species of horned lizard, Phrynosoma platyrhinos is most likely to run when startled, though they will often only run for a short period of time before stopping again. Unlike several other horned lizard species, desert horned lizards almost never squirt blood from their eyes.

The desert horned lizard has also been observed to exhibit rain-harvesting behavior in the wild, a behavior previously only attributed to a handful of other species. When rain-harvesting the lizard adopts specific posture in order to get its mouth closer to the ground.

Like other iguanids P. platyrhinos performs a number of displays. Iguanid displays are usually used to assert a social structure or for aggression and courtship, and can present in a variety of different behaviors such as: push ups, bobbing of the head, tail movements, along with changes in posture. In P. platyrhinos these displays are less aggressive and appear to be most concerned with sex and species recognition.

These behaviors include various tail positions such as curled, between the legs, or arched down with scratching behaviors, push ups, and a three-legged stance where one of the hind legs is held off the ground and the back is presented to predators.

== See also ==
- Texas horned lizard
