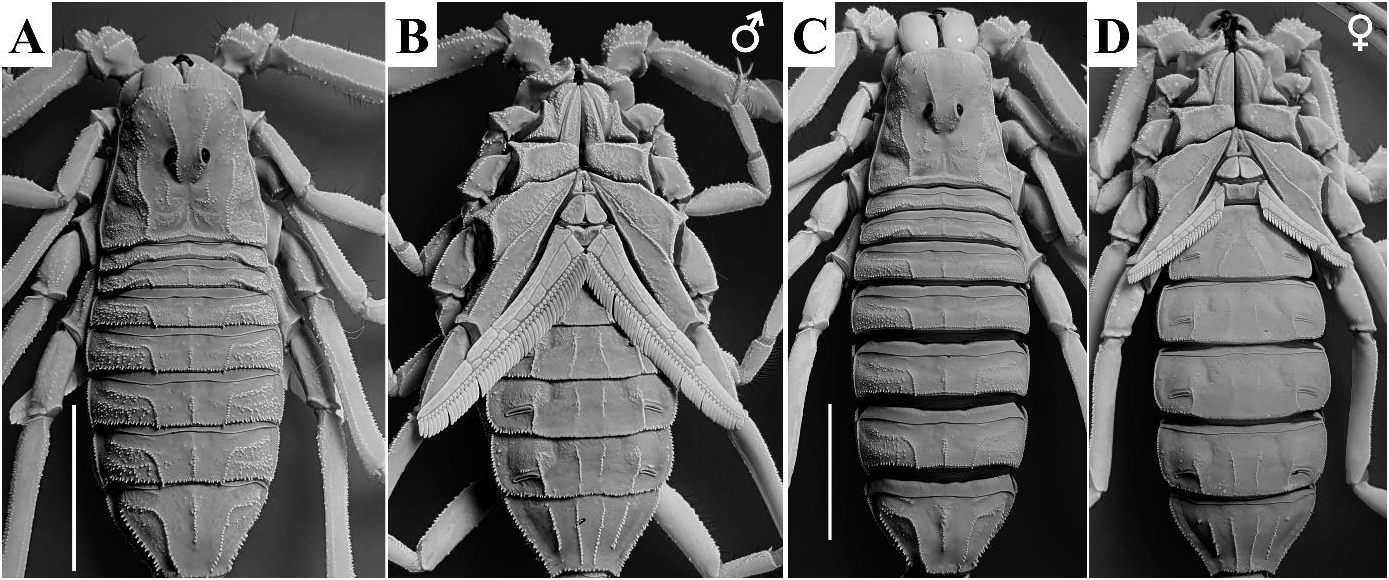
- Apistobuthus susanae, male (A-B) and female (C-D) from Al-Huwaymiliyah in Kuwait, under UV light source. (A, C) Carapace and tergites. (B, D) Coxosternal area and sternites. (Scale bar = 10 mm)

Scientific classification
- Domain: Eukaryota
- Kingdom: Animalia
- Phylum: Arthropoda
- Subphylum: Chelicerata
- Class: Arachnida
- Order: Scorpiones
- Family: Buthidae
- Genus: Apistobuthus
- Species: A. susanae

Binomial name
- Apistobuthus susanae Lourenço, 1998

= Apistobuthus susanae =

Species of scorpion

Apistobuthus susanae is a species of scorpion in the family Buthidae that was redescribed based on new specimens collected from Khoozestan Province, Iran. This species is named in honor of Susan Finnegan who described Apistobuthus genus, found in Iran in the province of Khoozestan and in Kuwait. A. susanae is differentiated from A. pterygocercus by several characters including more robust legs and pedipalps, shorter pectines, stronger carination, and complete fusion of central lateral posterior medial carinae of the carapace. Males measures 88 mm (3.5 in) and the female 91 mm (3.6 in) It is a highly venomous species and can be aggressive. They are nocturnal and known for making burrows in sand in which they spend their days.
