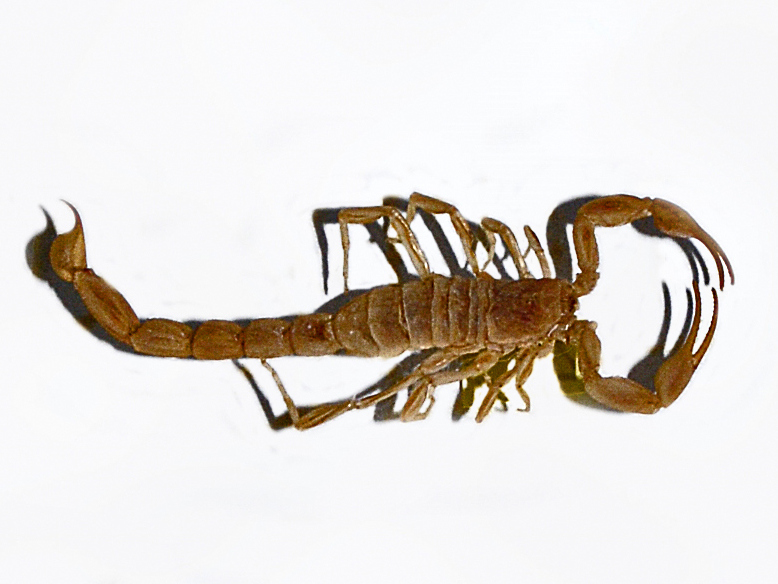
- Hottentotta conspersus. Museum specimen

Scientific classification
- Kingdom: Animalia
- Phylum: Arthropoda
- Subphylum: Chelicerata
- Class: Arachnida
- Order: Scorpiones
- Family: Buthidae
- Genus: Hottentotta
- Species: H. conspersus

Binomial name
- Hottentotta conspersus (Thorell, 1876)

Synonyms
- Buthus conspersus Thorell, 1876; Buthus aeratus Lawrence, 1955; Buthus angolensis Monard, 1930

= Hottentotta conspersus =

Species of scorpion

Hottentotta conspersus, the Sesriem scorpion, is a species of scorpion of the family Buthidae.

== Description ==
Hottentotta conspersus can reach a length of 40–65 millimetres (1.6–2.6 in). The body is sparsely hirsute, with a granulated mesosoma and carapace and a seventh metasomal segment. The telson is granulated and very bulbous. The chelae are very narrow. Color varies from yellow to yellowish-brown. The carapace and carinae may be black. The chelicerae are yellow and lack reticulation.

== Distribution ==
This species is found in Angola and Namibia.
