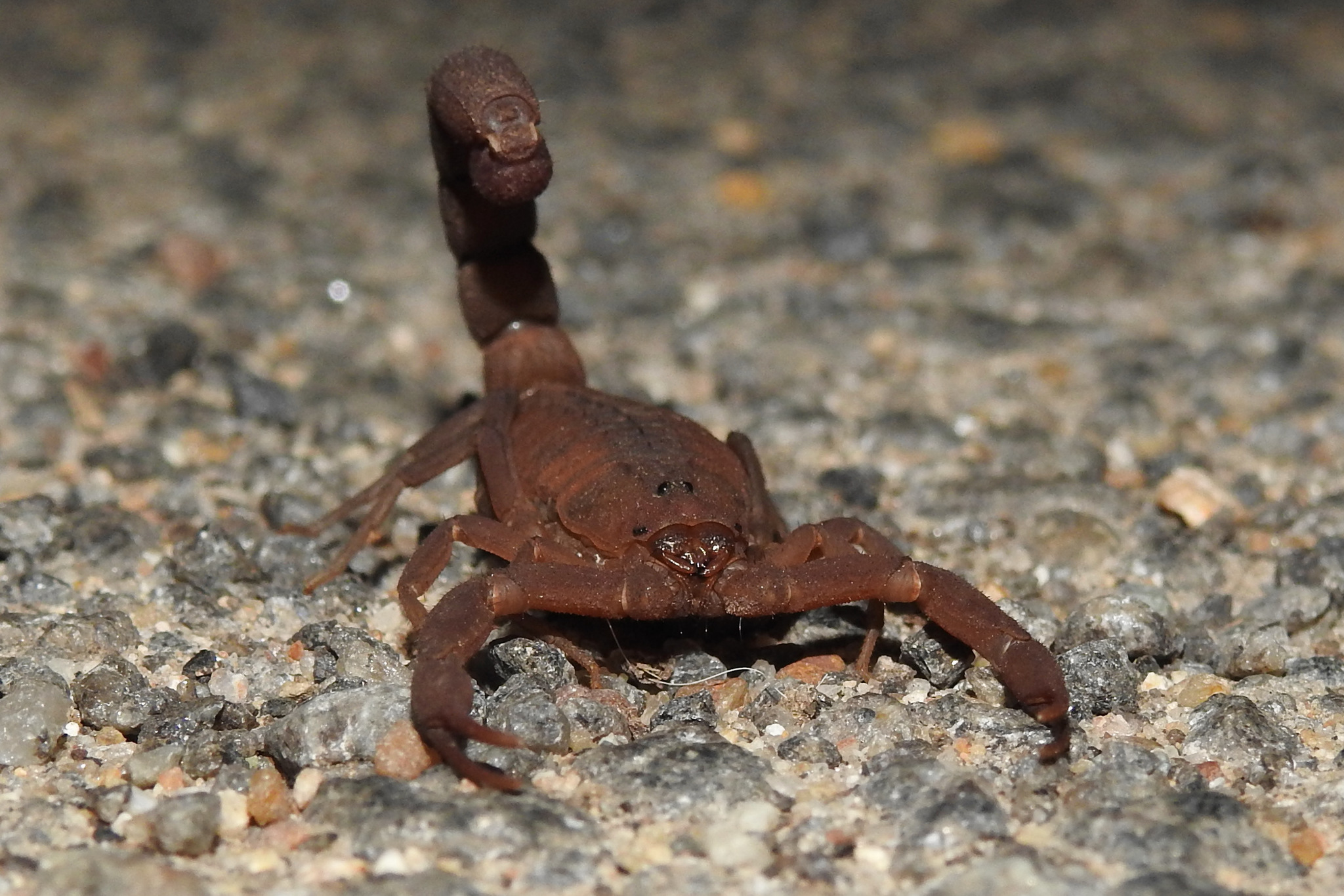
- From Vellore District, Tamil Nadu, India.

Scientific classification
- Kingdom: Animalia
- Phylum: Arthropoda
- Subphylum: Chelicerata
- Class: Arachnida
- Order: Scorpiones
- Family: Buthidae
- Genus: Hottentotta
- Species: H. rugiscutis

Binomial name
- Hottentotta rugiscutis Pocock, 1897

Synonyms
- Buthus hendersoni (Pocock, 1900); Buthus rugiscutis nigritus (Pocock, 1900)

= Hottentotta rugiscutis =

Species of scorpion

Hottentotta rugiscutis is a species of scorpion which is endemic to India.

== Description ==
Hottentotta rugiscutis measures 30–60 mm long. Males have twisted pedipalp fingers and wider manus. The chelicerae are yellow to green with a reticulate pattern. The color is consistently yellow to reddish brown with sparse body hair. Their pedipalps have 5 carinae on the femur, lacking carinae on the chela. The metasoma is densely granulated, with the first and second segments wider than long.

== Range ==
Hottentotta rugiscutis is endemic to India. From there it has been recorded in Tamil Nadu, Karnataka, Andhra Pradesh, Puducherry, Maharashtra, Madhya Pradesh, Goa, Jharkhand and West Bengal.

== Venom ==
Studies indicate that the venom of Hottentotta rugiscutis contains 0.79 mg/mg of protein. The LD_{50} value of its venom is approximately 4.2 mg/kg via the intraperitoneal route and 3.02 mg/kg via the subcutaneous route. Symptoms observed in animals injected with H. rugiscutis venom include agitation, hyper-excitability, sweating, paralysis, salivation, squeaking, hunched back movements, convulsions, weakness, and death.
