= George Thurland Prior =

British mineralogist

George Thurland Prior FRS
- Born: 16 December 1862; Oxford, England
- Died: 8 March 1936 (aged 73)
- Education: Magdalen College, Oxford
- Occupations: Mineralogist, Meteoriticist, Keeper of Mineralogy (1909 - 1927)
- Employer(s): Natural History Museum, British Museum
- Known for: Meteorite classification
- Awards: Murchison Medal (1927)

George Thurland Prior FRS (16 December 1862 – 8 March 1936) was a British mineralogist. He made great contributions to mineralogical chemistry, petrology and meteoritics.

He was born in Oxford, England, and attended Magdalen College there in 1881. He received a first class in the Honour School in Chemistry in 1885 and Physics in 1886. Later he went to study in Germany. He obtained his Doctor of Science degree from Oxford University in 1905.

He entered the British Museum in 1887, where he was Keeper of Minerals from 1909 to 1927. He was elected a Fellow of the Royal Society in 1912.

== Selected publications ==
- Prior, George Thurland (1912). "The meteoric stones of El Nakhla El Baharia (Egypt)". Mineralogical Magazine. 16 (76): 274–281. Bibcode:1912MinM...16..274P. doi:10.1180/minmag.1912.016.76.04.
- Prior, George Thurland (1916). "On the genetic relationship and classification of meteorites". Mineralogical Magazine. 18 (83): 26–44. Bibcode:1916MinM...18...26P. doi:10.1180/minmag.1916.018.83.04.
- Prior, George Thurland (1920). "The classification of meteorites". Mineralogical Magazine. 19 (90): 51–63. Bibcode:1920MinM...19...51P. doi:10.1180/minmag.1920.019.90.01.
- Prior, George Thurland (1922). The student's index to the collection of minerals. London: Trustees of the British Museum. p. 33.
- Prior, George Thurland (1923). Catalogue of meteorites : with special reference to those represented in the collection of the British Museum (Natural History). Trustees of the British Museum. p. 196.
- Prior, George Thurland (1926). A guide to the collection of meteorites. p. 43.

== See also ==
- Glossary of meteoritics
- Prior Island
- Meteorite classification#History
