= Hottentotta jalalabadensis =

Scientific classification
- Kingdom: Animalia
- Phylum: Arthropoda
- Subphylum: Chelicerata
- Class: Arachnida
- Order: Scorpiones
- Family: Buthidae
- Genus: Hottentotta
- Species: H. jalalabadensis

Binomial name
- Hottentotta jalalabadensis Kovařík, 2007

Species of scorpion

Hottentotta jalalabadensis is a species of scorpion of the family Buthidae. It was first found in Afghanistan.
