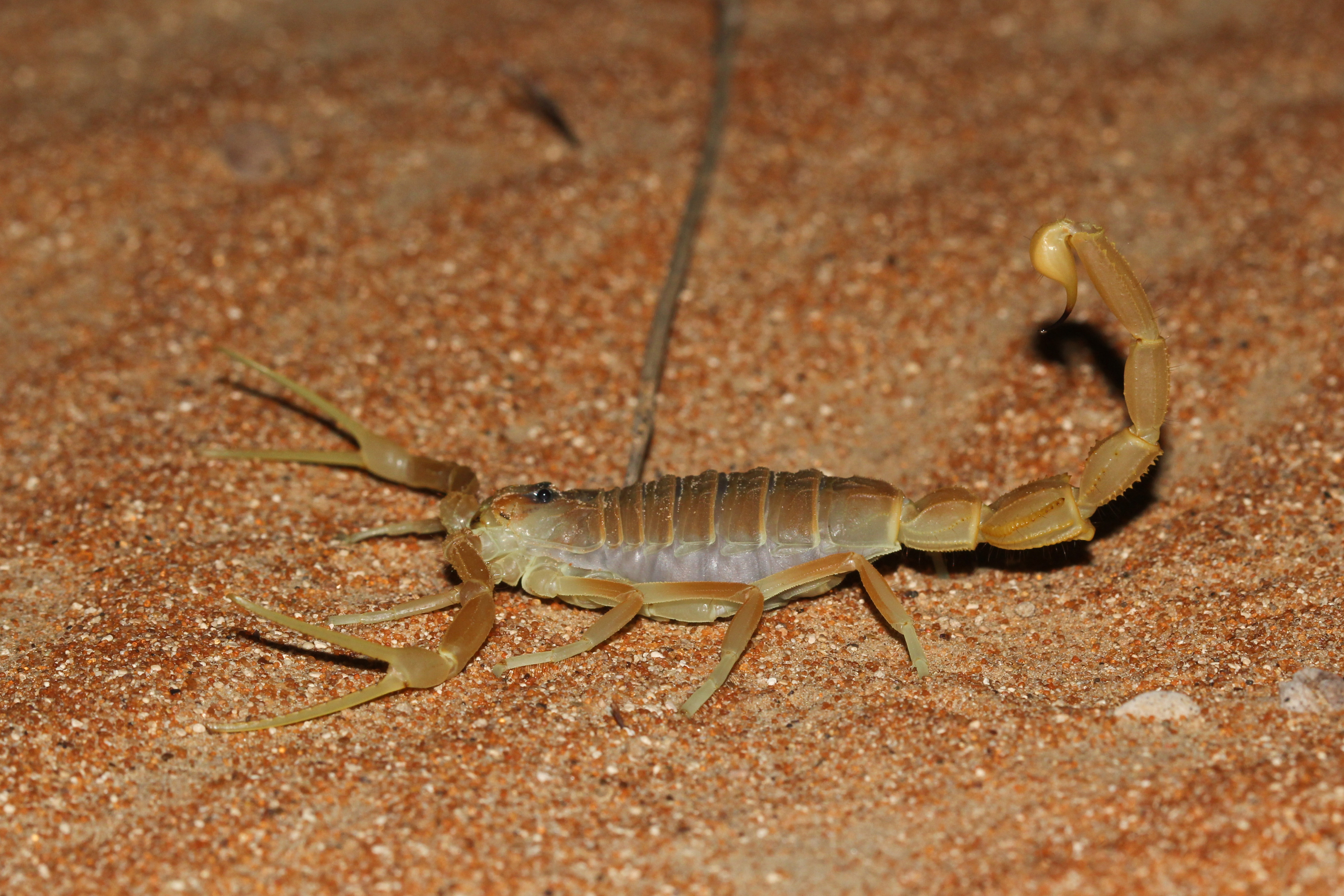
- Apistobuthus pterygocercus

Scientific classification
- Domain: Eukaryota
- Kingdom: Animalia
- Phylum: Arthropoda
- Subphylum: Chelicerata
- Class: Arachnida
- Order: Scorpiones
- Family: Buthidae
- Genus: Apistobuthus; Finnegan, 1932

Species
- Apistobuthus pterygocercus Finnegan, 1932; Apistobuthus susanae Lourenço, 1998

= Apistobuthus =

Genus of scorpions

Apistobuthus is a genus of scorpions in the family Buthidae. It was described by Susan Finnegan in 1932, and was for a long time considered to be monotypic, containing the single species A. pterygocercus. In 1998, a second species, A. susanae, was described by Wilson Lourenço; its specific epithet commemorates Susan Finnegan. A. susanae differs from A. pterygocercus in having stouter legs and pedipalps, among other characteristics. Both species are highly venomous and the second segment of their tail is wider than the others.
