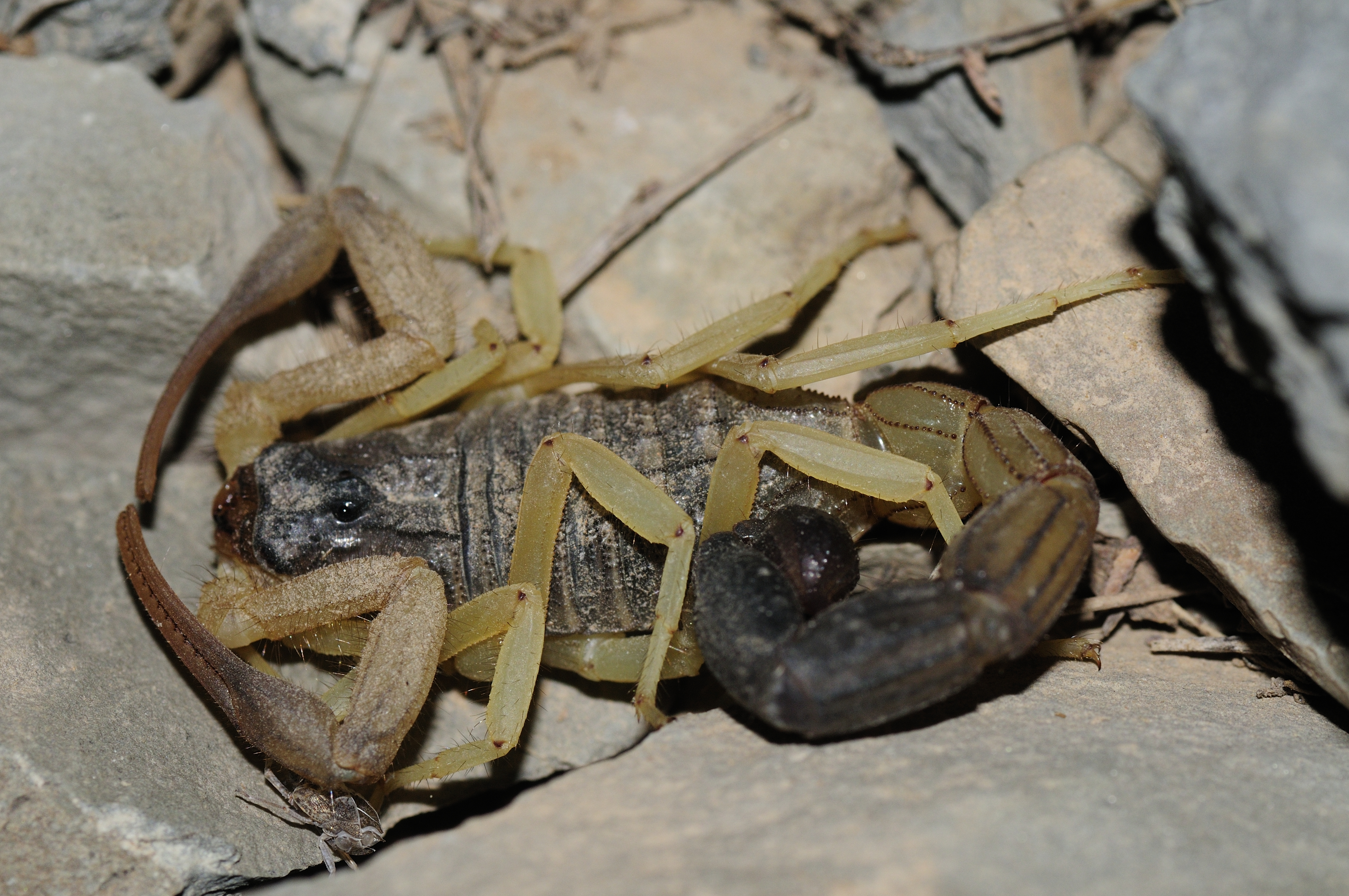
- Hottentotta jayakari jayakari from Al Hajar Mountains, Oman

Scientific classification
- Kingdom: Animalia
- Phylum: Arthropoda
- Subphylum: Chelicerata
- Class: Arachnida
- Order: Scorpiones
- Family: Buthidae
- Genus: Hottentotta
- Species: H. jayakari

Binomial name
- Hottentotta jayakari (Pocock, 1895)

Synonyms
- H. tamulus concanensis (Pocock, 1900); Buthus jayakari Pocock, 1895

= Hottentotta jayakari =

Species of scorpion

Hottentotta jayakari, the black-tailed alligatorback scorpion, is a species of scorpion of the family Buthidae. It is geographically widespread, occupying much of the Arabian Peninsula and Iran.

== Taxonomy ==
Much like its relatives, the scorpion was initially classified in the genus Buthus by Pocock in 1895. 13 years later, the taxon Hottentotta would be suggested as a subgenus but was then elevated to a full genus of its own in 1934.

The species name refers to Dr. Atmaram Sadashiv Jayakar, an Indian military surgeon stationed in Oman who eventually gained an interest of wildlife in the region.

== Description ==
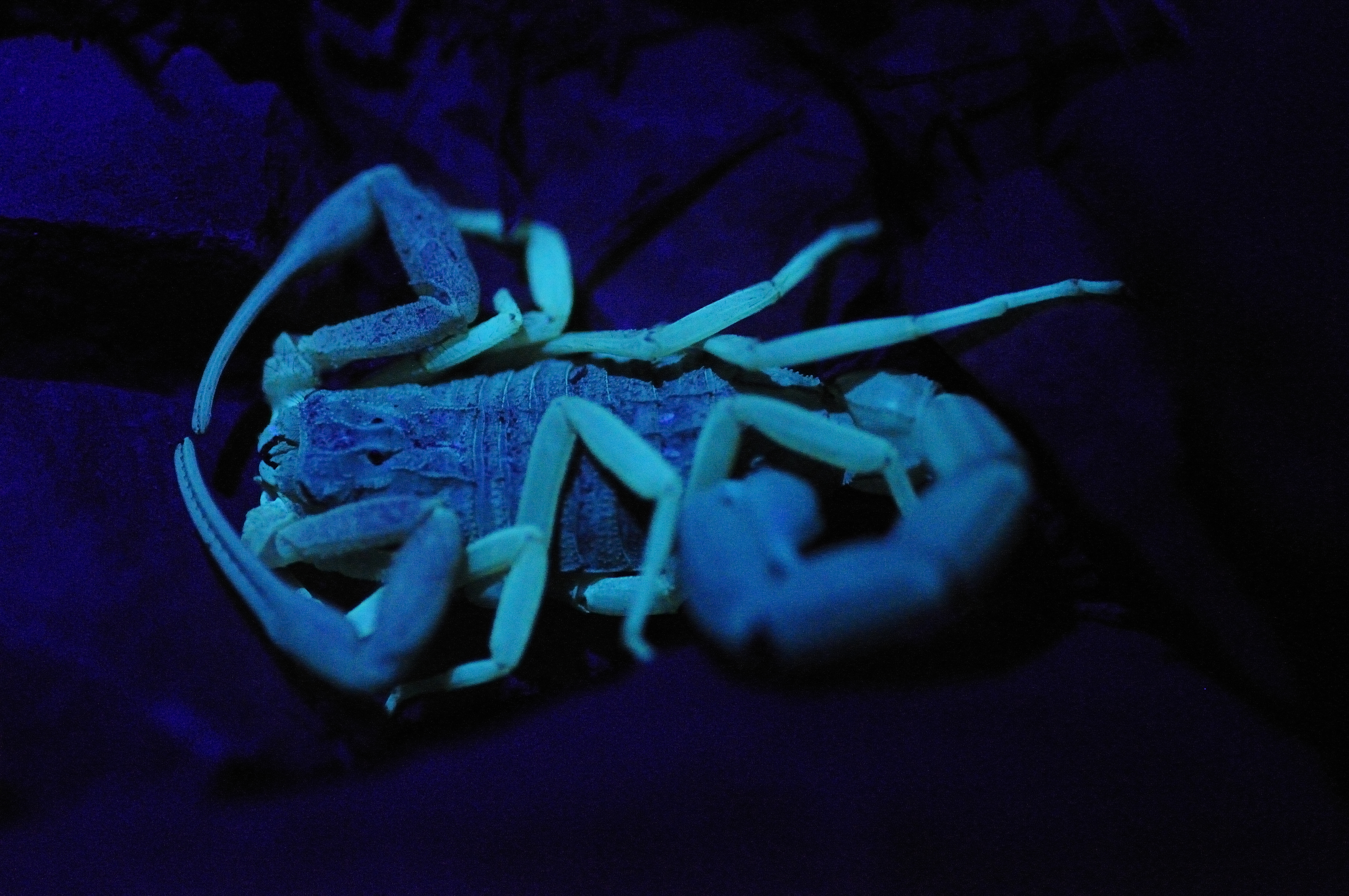
Fluorescing under a blacklight

Bearing the typical buthid appearance, diagnosis of this species is decided by its colour. The sting, pedipalps and cephalothorax of the scorpion are all black. Both extremities of the scorpion form a gradient fading from black to dark yellow, on the femur and sting segments. The legs of the scorpion are a bright yellow, forming a strong contrast. Much like all scorpions, the body will fluoresce if illuminated with ultraviolet light. Excluding the stinger, the body reaches a length of 50 mm, and up to 90 mm if it is included

== Behaviour ==
It is reported as being shy and unlikely to sting preferring to flee. It is predatory, feeding on smaller animals which are subdued by a strong sting, as typical with scorpions in the family Buthidae. The venom has not been properly quantified, however it is assumed that it is medically significant.
