= Hottentotta stockwelli =

Scientific classification
- Kingdom: Animalia
- Phylum: Arthropoda
- Subphylum: Chelicerata
- Class: Arachnida
- Order: Scorpiones
- Family: Buthidae
- Genus: Hottentotta
- Species: H. stockwelli

Binomial name
- Hottentotta stockwelli Kovařík, 2007

Species of scorpion

Hottentotta stockwelli is a species of scorpion of the family Buthidae. It was first found in Andhra Pradesh and Maharashtra, India.
