= Keeper of Mineralogy, Natural History Museum =

The Keeper of Mineralogy is a geological academic position within the Natural History Museum, London. Following structural changes in the scientific departments in 2013 the Departments of Mineralogy and Palaeontology merged to become the Earth Sciences Department http://www.nhm.ac.uk/our-science/departments-and-staff/earth-sciences.html. The title Keeper of Mineralogy is no longer used. The current Head of the Department is Professor Richard Herrington http://www.nhm.ac.uk/our-science/departments-and-staff/staff-directory/richard-herrington.html

== Keepers of Mineralogy ==
- Carl Dietrich Eberhard König (1813–1851)
- George Robert Waterhouse (1851–1857)
- Mervyn Herbert Nevil Story-Maskelyne (1857–1880)
- Lazarus Fletcher (1880–1909)
- George Thurland Prior (1909–1927)
- Leonard James Spencer (1927–1935)
- George Frederick Herbert Smith (1935–1937)
- Walter Campbell Smith (1937–1952)
- Frederick Allan Bannister (1952–1953)
- Gordon Frank Claringbull (1953–1968)
- Alfred Allinson Moss (1968–1974)
- Arthur Clive Bishop (1975–1989)
- Paul Henderson (1989–1995)
- Robert Frederick Symes (1995–1996)
- Andrew James Fleet (1996–2013)
