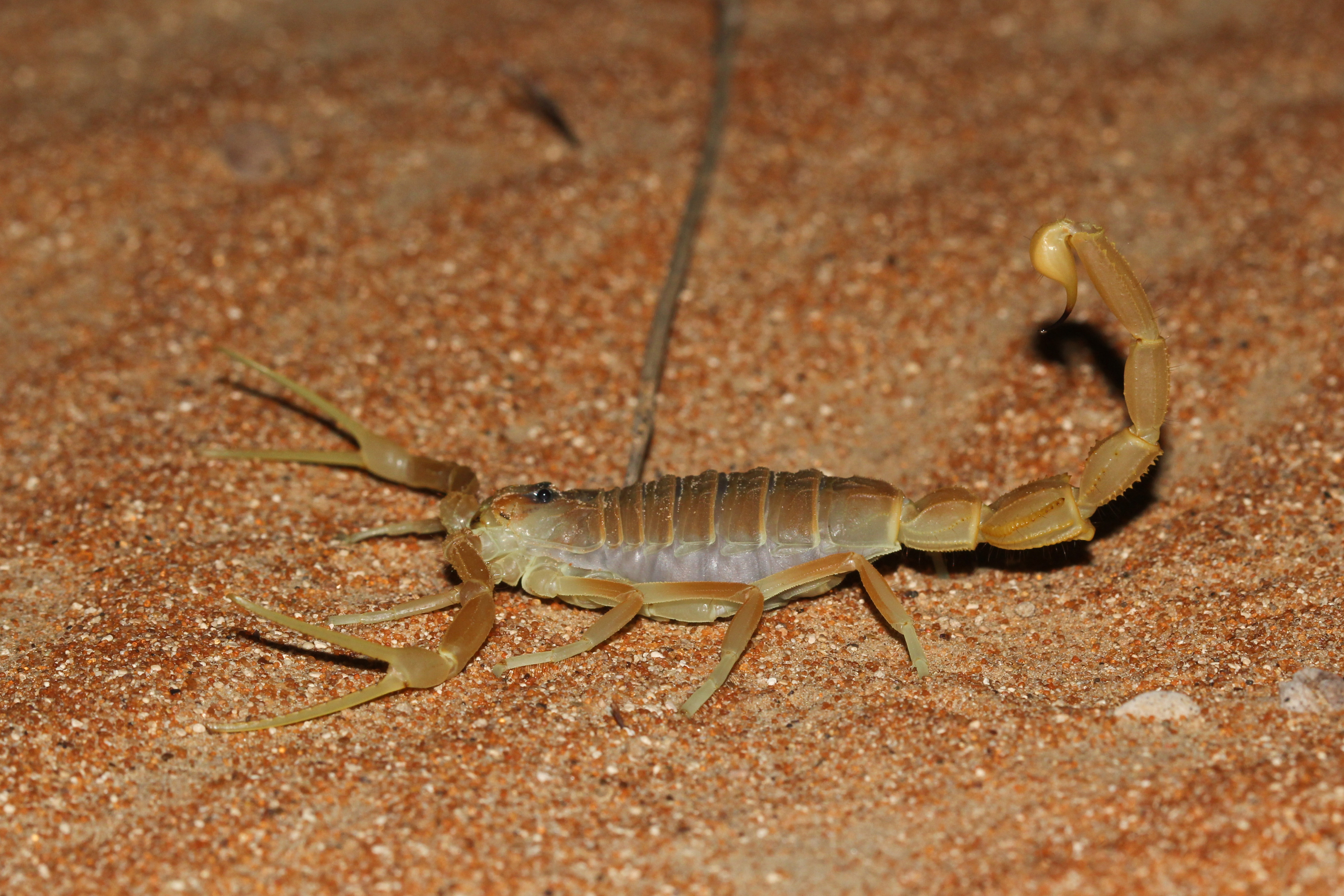

Scientific classification
- Kingdom: Animalia
- Phylum: Arthropoda
- Subphylum: Chelicerata
- Class: Arachnida
- Order: Scorpiones
- Family: Buthidae
- Genus: Apistobuthus
- Species: A. pterygocercus

Binomial name
- Apistobuthus pterygocercus Finnegan, 1932

= Apistobuthus pterygocercus =

Species of scorpion

Apistobuthus pterygocercus (Shield-tailed Scorpion) also called the giant arabian deathstalker is a species of scorpion that lives on the Arabian Peninsula. It is a highly venomous species, and is therefore of medical importance. It was first described by Susan Finnegan in 1932.
