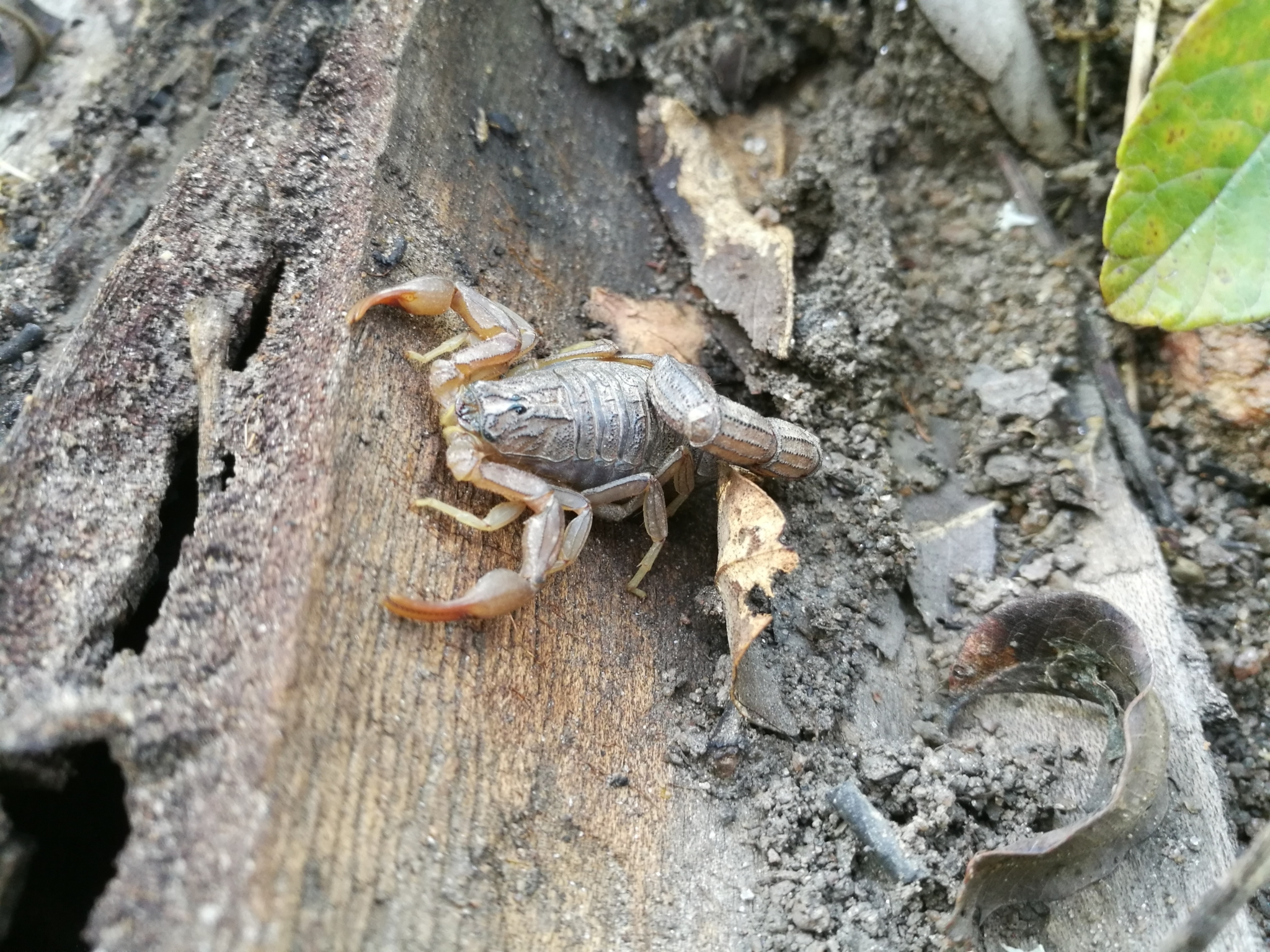

Scientific classification
- Domain: Eukaryota
- Kingdom: Animalia
- Phylum: Arthropoda
- Subphylum: Chelicerata
- Class: Arachnida
- Order: Scorpiones
- Family: Buthidae
- Genus: Hottentotta
- Species: H. hottentotta

Binomial name
- Hottentotta hottentotta (Fabricius, 1787)

= Hottentotta hottentotta =

Species of scorpion

Hottentotta hottentotta, also known by its common name alligatorback scorpion is a species from the genus Hottentotta. The species was first described by Johan Christian Fabricius in 1787. The species is found in West Africa. Females are capable of parthenogenesis.
