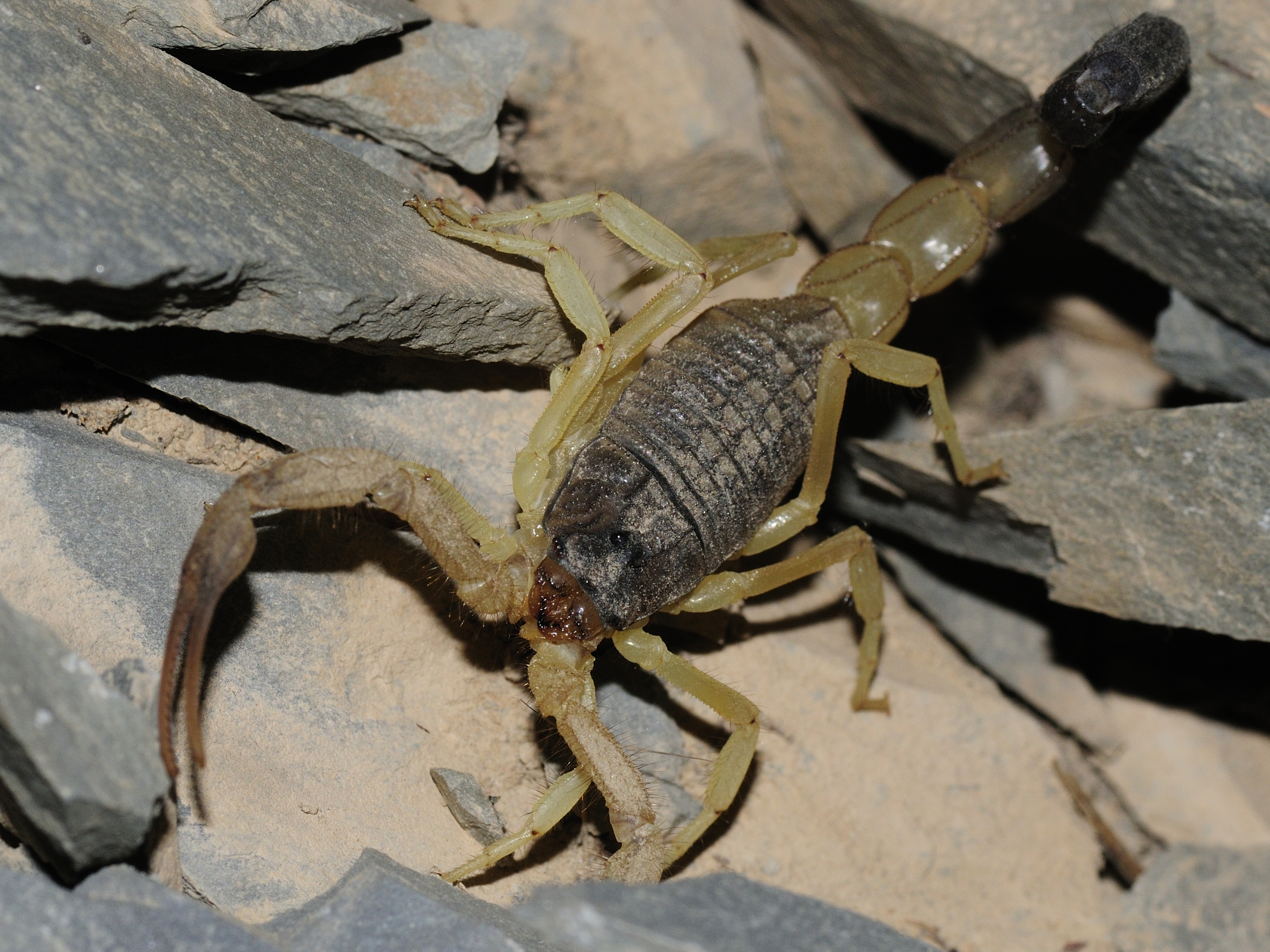
- Hottentotta jayakari jayakari

Scientific classification
- Domain: Eukaryota
- Kingdom: Animalia
- Phylum: Arthropoda
- Subphylum: Chelicerata
- Class: Arachnida
- Order: Scorpiones
- Family: Buthidae
- Genus: Hottentotta; Birula, 1908

Type species
- Scorpio hottentotta Fabricius, 1787

Diversity
- About 39 species

Synonyms
- Buthotus Vachon, 1949; Hottentotta (Balfourianus) Vachon, 1979; Hottentotta (Deccanobuthus) Lourenço, 2000

= Hottentotta =

Genus of scorpions

Hottentotta is a genus of scorpions of the family Buthidae. It is distributed widely across Africa, except for most of the Sahara desert. Species in the genus also occur in the Middle East, the Arabian Peninsula, southeastern Turkey, Iraq, Iran, Afghanistan, Pakistan, India, Nepal, Cape Verde Islands, and Sri Lanka (introduced).

== Taxonomy ==
The genus was introduced in 1908 by A. A. Birula, originally as a subgenus of the genus Buthus. It was elevated to genus rank by F. Werner in 1934. Buthotus Vachon, 1949 is an often used but outdated synonym of Hottentotta.

Some authors subdivided the genus into three subgenera, Hottentotta (Hottentotta), Hottentotta (Balfourianus) Vachon, 1979, and Hottentotta (Deccanobuthus) Lourenço, 2000. The latest taxonomic reviews of this genus by F. Kovařík reject this subdivision and recognizes a single, undivided genus Hottentotta. The differences separating the closely related genus Mesobuthus from Hottentotta are very subtle, and species have been often been misassigned among the two genera.

=== Diversity ===
The content of this genus may vary, depending on the authority. At least 40-41 species are known:

- Hottentotta alticola (Pocock, 1895)
- Hottentotta arenaceus (Purcell, 1902)
- Hottentotta buchariensis (Birula, 1897)
- Hottentotta caboverdensis Lourenço & Ythier, 2006
- Hottentotta conspersus (Thorell, 1876)
- Hottentotta finneganae Kovařík, 2007
- Hottentotta flavidulus Teruel & Rein, 2010
- Hottentotta franzwerneri (Birula, 1914)
- Hottentotta fuscitruncus (Caporiacco, 1936)
- Hottentotta gentili (Pallary, 1924)
- Hottentotta hottentotta (Fabricius, 1787) (type species)
- Hottentotta jabalpurensis Kovařík, 2007
- Hottentotta jalalabadensis Kovařík, 2007
- Hottentotta jayakari (Pocock, 1895)
- Hottentotta judaicus (Simon, 1872)
- Hottentotta khoozestanus Navidpour, Kovařík, Soleglad & Fet, 2008
- Hottentotta lacroixi Ythier & Dupre, 2021
- Hottentotta lorestanus Navidpour, Nayebzadeh, Soleglad, Fet, Kovařík & Kayedi, 2010
- Hottentotta mateui Lourenço, Duhem & Cloudsley-Thompson, 2012
- Hottentotta mazuchi Kovařík, 2013
- Hottentotta minax (L. Koch, 1875)
- Hottentotta minusalta Vachon, 1959
- Hottentotta mesopotamicus Lourenço & Qi, 2007
- Hottentotta niloticus (Birula, 1928)
- Hottentotta pachyurus (Pocock, 1897)
- Hottentotta pellucidus Lowe, 2010
- Hottentotta penjabensis (Birula, 1897)
- Hottentotta polystictus (Pocock, 1896)
- Hottentotta rugiscutis (Pocock, 1897)
- Hottentotta saulcyi (Simon, 1880)
- Hottentotta saxinatans Lowe, 2010
- Hottentotta scaber (Ehrenberg, 1828)
- Hottentotta schach (Birula, 1905)
- Hottentotta socotrensis (Pocock, 1898)
- Hottentotta songi (Lourenço, Qi & Zhu, 2005)
- Hottentotta sousai Turiel, 2014
- Hottentotta stockwelli Kovařík, 2007
- Hottentotta tamulus (Fabricius, 1798)
- Hottentotta trailini Kovařík, 2013
- Hottentotta trilineatus (Peters, 1861)
- Hottentotta ugandaensis Kovařík, 2013
- Hottentotta zagrosensis Kovařík, 1997

==== Disputed species ====
- Hottentotta syrticus (Borelli, 1914) and Buthotus (=Hottentotta) asimii Amir, Kamaluddin & Khan, 2004 are considered nomina dubia.

== General characteristics ==
Members of Hottentotta are generally moderately sized scorpions, with a total length of 70–90 millimetres (2.8–3.5 in); the smallest species are 30 millimetres (1.2 in) long, while the largest species reach 100–130 millimetres (3.9–5.1 in). They belong to the most colorful species of scorpions. The base color ranges from bright yellow to black, with most species colored in brown or reddish tones. Many species are ornamented by color spots or bands especially on the mesosoma. Coloration may be considerable variable between individuals of the same species or among regional populations.

They show a typical buthid habitus with gracile pedipalp chelae and a moderately thickened metasoma. The vesicle is bulbous and proportionally large in some species. The cephalothorax and mesosoma shows distinct granulation in most species, some are strongly hirsute. The tergites of the mesosoma bear three distinct, longitudinal carinae (ridges).

=== Toxicity ===
As in other buthids the venom in at least some species of Hottentotta is relatively potent and can be of medical importance to humans.

Hottentotta tamulus, the Indian red scorpion, has evidently caused human fatalities by cardiovascular and pulmonary manifestations of intoxication and is considered the most lethal scorpion species in the world.

Kleber et al. (1999) listed envenomation by at least four other species as to cause clinically significant symptoms.

Relative toxicity and symptoms caused by envenomation from Hottentotta species
Species	Median lethal dose (LD_{50} [mg/kg]_{mice})	Symptoms	Species distribution
H. alticola	not available	Severe pain, questionably cholinergic symptoms	Afghanistan, Pakistan
H. franzwerneri	not available	Severe pain, reportedly affection of the cardiovascular and central nervous systems, questionably cholinergic symptoms	Algeria, Morocco
H. judaicus	7.94	Severe pain, reportedly affection of the cardiovascular and central nervous systems, questionably cholinergic symptoms	Israel, Lebanon, Syria, southeastern Turkey
H. minax	not available	Severe pain, questionably cholinergic symptoms	Cameroon, Chad, southern Libya, southern Egypt, Sudan, Ethiopia, Eritrea, Kenya, questionably Tanzania and Uganda
H. saulcyi	1.01	not available	Eastern Turkey, Iraq, Iran, Afghanistan, questionably Syria
H. tamulus	not available	Severe pain, cardiovascular symptoms (including acute myocarditis, cardiac dysrhythmia, ischemia-like changes and conduction blockade), pulmonary oedema	Pakistan, India, and southeastern Nepal

This listing is not comprehensive due to lack of data and all species of Hottentotta are potentially highly venomous to humans. Note that the LD_{50} value might differ considerably between populations of the same species.

== Habitat ==
Most species live in semi-arid to humid, steppe, savannah and forested environments. Hyperarid deserts are avoided. Some reach considerable topographic altitudes as e.g. in the Atlas Mountains, the Zagros Mountains or at the Hindukush.

== In captivity ==
Due to their relatively colorful appearance Hottentotta species are often kept and bred in captivity. Popular species are H. hottentotta and H. trilineatus. As with other highly venomous buthids keeping these species in captivity is only recommendable to experienced people.
