= Hottentotta jabalpurensis =

Scientific classification
- Kingdom: Animalia
- Phylum: Arthropoda
- Subphylum: Chelicerata
- Class: Arachnida
- Order: Scorpiones
- Family: Buthidae
- Genus: Hottentotta
- Species: H. jabalpurensis

Binomial name
- Hottentotta jabalpurensis Kovařík, 2007

Species of scorpion

Hottentotta jabalpurensis is a species of scorpion, belonging to the family Buthidae. It was first found in Jabalpur, Madhya Pradesh, India.
