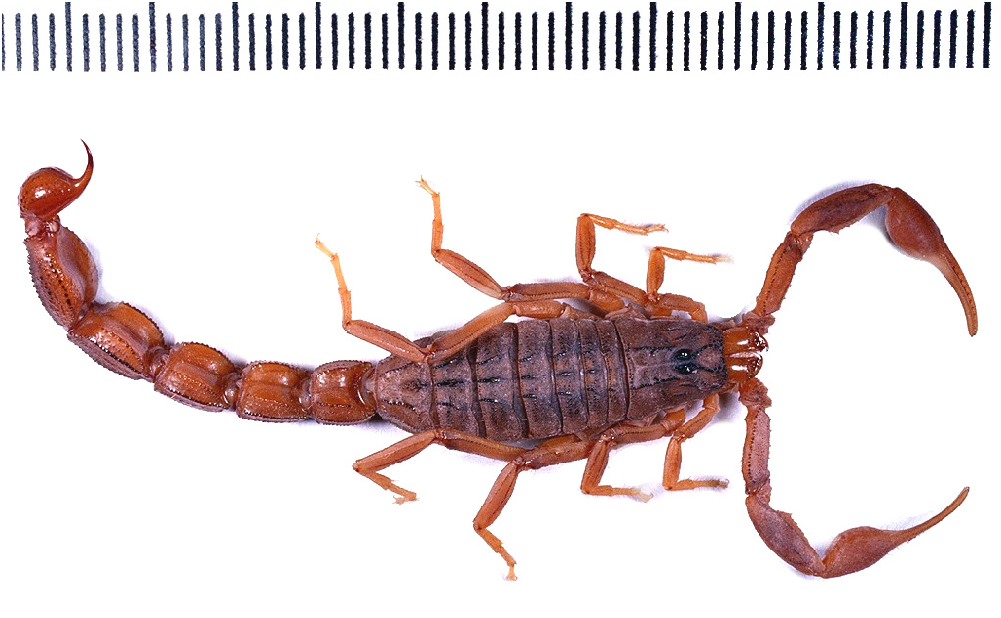
- Hottentotta finneganae, sp. nov., dorsal view, male holotype

Scientific classification
- Kingdom: Animalia
- Phylum: Arthropoda
- Subphylum: Chelicerata
- Class: Arachnida
- Order: Scorpiones
- Family: Buthidae
- Genus: Hottentotta
- Species: H. finneganae

Binomial name
- Hottentotta finneganae Kovařík, 2007

= Hottentotta finneganae =

Species of scorpion

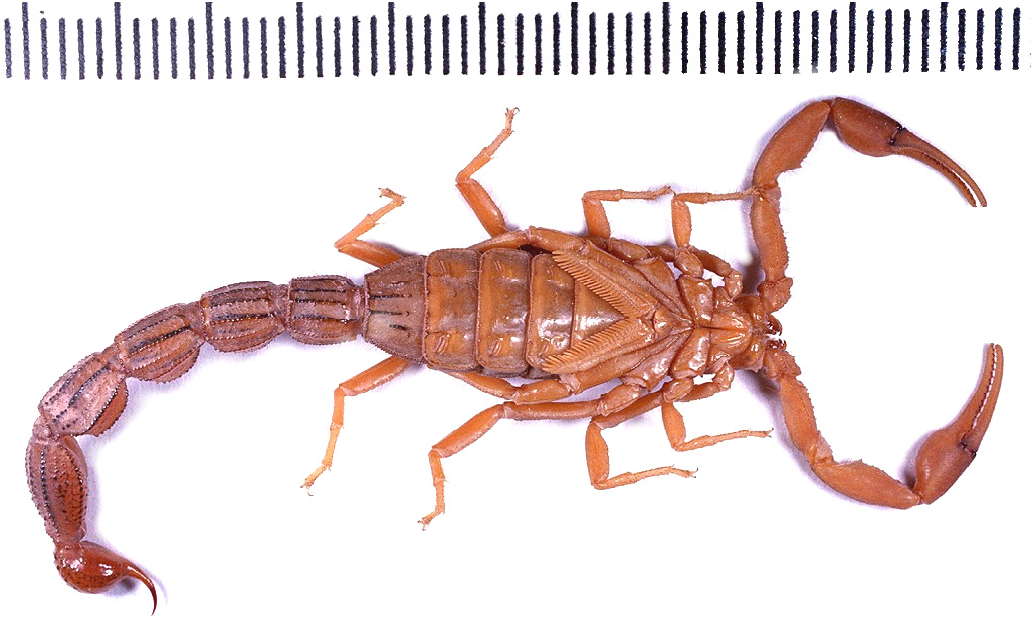
Hottentotta finneganae, sp. nov., ventral view, male holotype

Figures from Kovařík: Hottentotta Revision p89, Hottentotta finneganae, sp. nov., male holotype.

Hottentotta finneganae is a species of scorpion, belonging to the family Buthidae. It was first found in Pakistan, and was named for Susan Finnegan, a zoologist who worked on scorpions in the 1930s, and was the first woman appointed to a post at the British Museum (Natural History).
