= Walter Campbell Smith =

British mineralogist and petrologist (1887–1988)

Lieutenant-Colonel Walter Campbell-Smith CBE MC TD
- Born: Walter Campbell Smith; 30 November 1887; Solihull, Warwickshire, UK
- Died: 6 December 1988 (aged 101); Tunbridge Wells, Kent, UK
- Education: Corpus Christi College, Cambridge, B.A. (1909)
- Known for: Studies of rocks from Antarctica and the ocean floor
- Spouse: Susan Finnegan (m. 1936)
- Awards: Murchison Medal, 1945
- Scientific career
- Fields: Mineralogy and petrology
- Workplaces: British Museum (Natural History)

Walter Campbell Smith CBE MC TD (30 November 1887 – 6 December 1988) was a British mineralogist and petrologist. He was awarded the Murchison Medal in 1945, and was president of the Geological Society of London from 1955 to 1956.

== Biography and career ==
Campbell Smith was born in Solihull, in 1887, and attended Solihull School until 1906. He then studied crystallography and mineralogy at Corpus Christi College, Cambridge, graduating in 1910 with first class honours. After taking the examinations for entry to the civil service, Campbell Smith was appointed to an assistantship in the department of minerals at the British Museum (Natural History) (now the Natural History Museum) in 1910. He took up his position the day after his 23rd birthday. In the competition for the post, Campbell Smith was placed above geologist Arthur Holmes, who later pioneered radiometric dating, on the basis of his better performance in Latin.

Campbell Smith worked at the British Museum for the rest of his career, with the exception of two periods of military service. From 1914 to 1918, he served with the Artists' Rifles and the Royal Engineers, and again, from 1939 to 1941. In 1937, he was appointed Keeper of Mineralogy. When he was appointed deputy chief scientific officer for the museum in 1948, he featured in the Illustrated London News as one of the personalities of the week. He retired from the museum in 1952.

Campbell Smith began his museum work on the collections from Scott's Terra Nova expeditions from 1910 to 1913. In all, he published nine papers on the metamorphic and igneous rocks from McMurdo Sound to Victoria Land, three between 1921 and 1924; the remainder from 1954 to 1963, after he had retired. He also curated the foreign rock collection of the Geological Society of London, which had been acquired in 1911. Later he worked on carbonatites from Malawi (then called Nyasaland), and recognised their volcanic origins. Other topics he worked on included stone hand axes, meteorites, and the geology of rocks collected from the sea floor. In his retirement, Campbell Smith continued to work in the museum, and he published his last paper, on the history of mineralogy research in the museum, at the age of 94.

Campbell Smith was secretary of the Geological Society of London from 1921 to 1932. From 1921 to 1924, he was a fellow of Corpus Christi College, Cambridge. He was president of the Mineralogical Society of Great Britain and Ireland from 1945 to 1948, and president of the Geological Society from 1955 to 1956.

== Military career ==
Campbell Smith began military service in 1914 as a lance-corporal in the 28th battalion, known as the Artists' Rifles. In 1915, he was seconded to the 4th Battalion of the Special Brigade of the Royal Engineers. The special brigade recruited volunteers with a background in chemistry, and were responsible for the British chemical warfare projects during the First World War. This included Campbell Smith, with his mineralogical training. He worked under Charles Foulkes, and remained in the special brigade for the rest of the war. In June 1916, he was in charge of P and Q company, at the front at Blairville - Ficheux, when the special brigade launched gas attack. By the end of the war, Campbell Smith held the rank of lieutenant colonel. He continued to volunteer with the Artists' Rifles after the war. In 1935, he retired with the rank of brevet lieutenant colonel.

During the Second World War, Campbell Smith volunteered once again for service, and from 1939 to 1941 he was second-in-command of 163 OCTU, an Officer Cadet training unit formed from the Artists' Rifles.

== Awards and recognition ==
Campbell Smith received both military and civilian honours. In January 1917, he was awarded the Military Cross for his service with the special brigade. At that stage he held the rank of 2nd Lieutenant (temporary Captain). In 1929, he was awarded the Territorial Decoration (TD) for his long service in the Territorial Army.

In 1945, he was awarded the Murchison Medal of the Geological Society of London for his "work on petrology and mineralogy, and his long service as secretary to the Society". Campbell Smith was awarded the CBE in the 1949 New Year Honours list.

== Deed poll ==
In August 1959, Campbell Smith declared by deed poll that he was abandoning the surname 'Smith', and thereafter was to be known as Walter Campbell-Smith.

== Family ==
Campbell Smith married zoologist Susan Finnegan in 1936. Finnegan was head of the arachnids section at the museum at the time, and worked on mites and ticks but had to resign her post in order to marry. Campbell Smith died in December 1988, shortly after celebrating his 101st birthday. His archives are held at the Natural History Museum.
