= Susan Finnegan =

British arachnologist and zoologist (1903–1995)

Susan Finnegan FLS
- Born: 20 October 1903; Belfast
- Died: 20 June 1995 (aged 91)
- Education: Queen's University Belfast (BSc); Newnham College, Cambridge (PhD)
- Known for: Work on Acari, spiders and scorpions
- Spouse: Walter Campbell Smith (m. 1936; died 1988)
- Scientific career
- Fields: Zoology
- Workplaces: British Museum (Natural History)
- Thesis: Report on the Brachyura collected by the S.Y. 'St George' on the east and west coasts of Central America (PhD) (1930)

Susan Finnegan (20 October 1903 – 20 June 1995) was a British zoologist, who specialised in the study of mites and ticks. She was the first woman appointed to a scientific post at the Natural History Museum, London, in 1927, and was the first woman to describe and name a new genus of scorpion, Apistobuthus. Two species of scorpion have been named in her honour. Finnegan was required to resign her post at the Natural History Museum in 1936, in order to marry her fellow museum worker Walter Campbell Smith.

== Career ==
Finnegan was born in Belfast in October 1903. She was the youngest daughter of John Maxwell Finnegan and Susanna Wilson Dobbin. One of her brothers, Robert Thompson Finnegan, died during World War 1 near Saint Quentin in March 1918. Her other brother, Thomas Finnegan, was later president of Selly Oak Colleges.

Finnegan was educated at Victoria College, Belfast, and then at Queen's University Belfast where she graduated with a BSc. She then studied at Newnham College, Cambridge as a research student, from 1925 to 1927. She completed her doctoral studies in 1928, and was awarded a PhD from the University of Cambridge in 1930, with a thesis on crabs collected by the English zoologist Cyril Crossland on the St George expedition to the South Pacific in 1924. She published this work in 1931.

In July 1927, Finnegan was appointed assistant keeper in the department of zoology at the Natural History Museum, where she was head of the arachnids section from September 1927 to July 1936. She was the first woman appointed to a post at the Natural History Museum, London. In this role, she worked extensively on the Acari (mites and ticks), as well as on spiders and scorpions. She published a number of scientific papers on these topics, including the description of three new species of mites that she found on spiders, snakes and sea lions. She gave regular public talks on spiders and scorpions on Sunday afternoons at the Natural History Museum.

Finnegan was elected a Fellow of the Linnean Society in 1928.

== New genus of scorpion ==
In 1932, Finnegan described three specimens of a new scorpion that had been collected by the British explorer Bertram Thomas from the Rub' al-Khali in the southern Arabian peninsula. She recognised that these specimens all had a unique disc-shaped abdominal segment, not previously seen in scorpions, and assigned these specimens to a new genus, Apistobuthus. It transpired that all three of the specimens were immature, and it was not until 1960 that an adult female scorpion of this genus was described, from specimens collected by Wilfred Thesiger in Wadi Andhur, Oman. Finnegan was the first female scientist to describe a new genus of scorpion. In recognition of her contributions to the study of scorpions, Finnegan has had two scorpions named in her honour, Hottentotta finneganae, and Apistobuthus susanae.

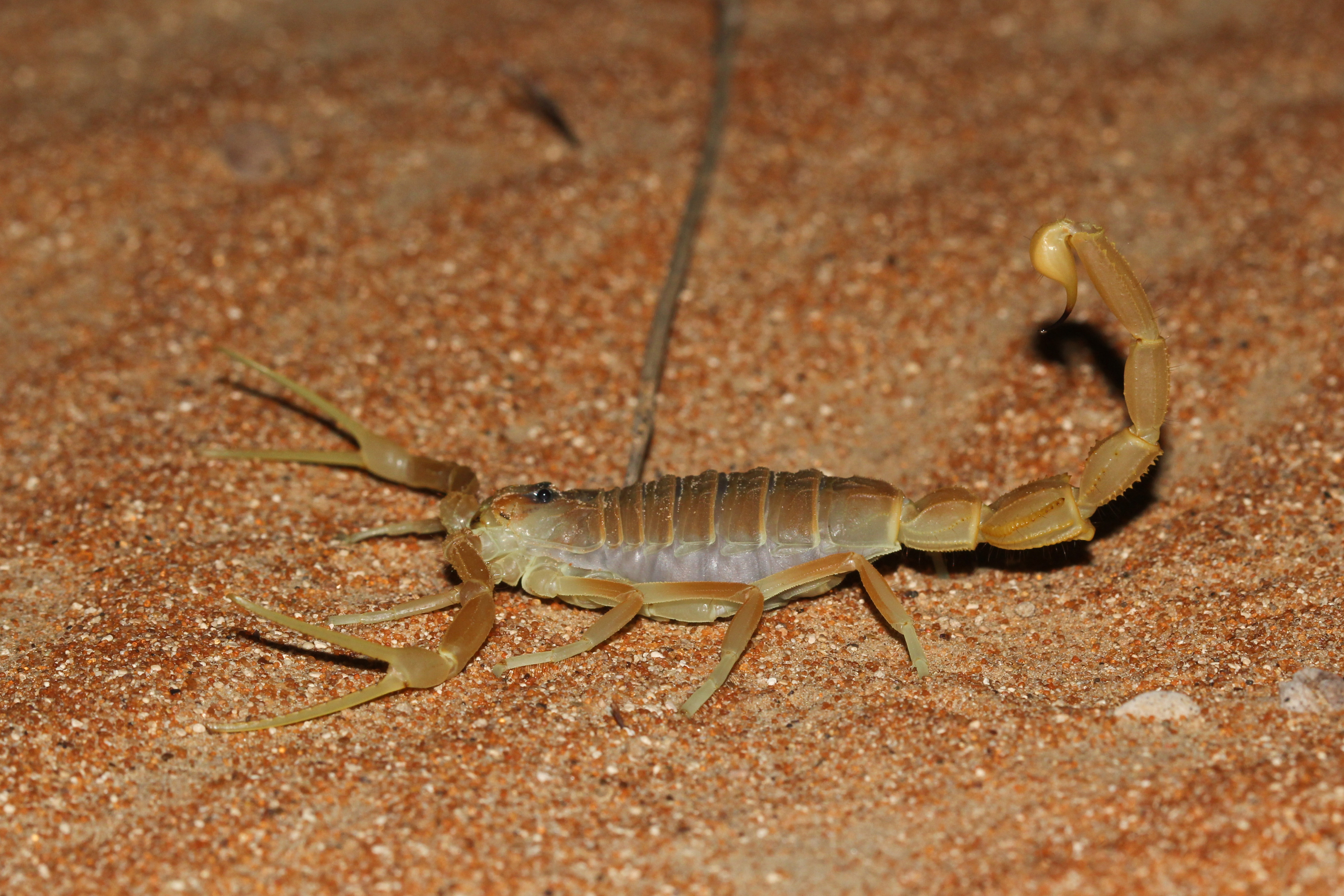
Apistobuthus pterygocercus

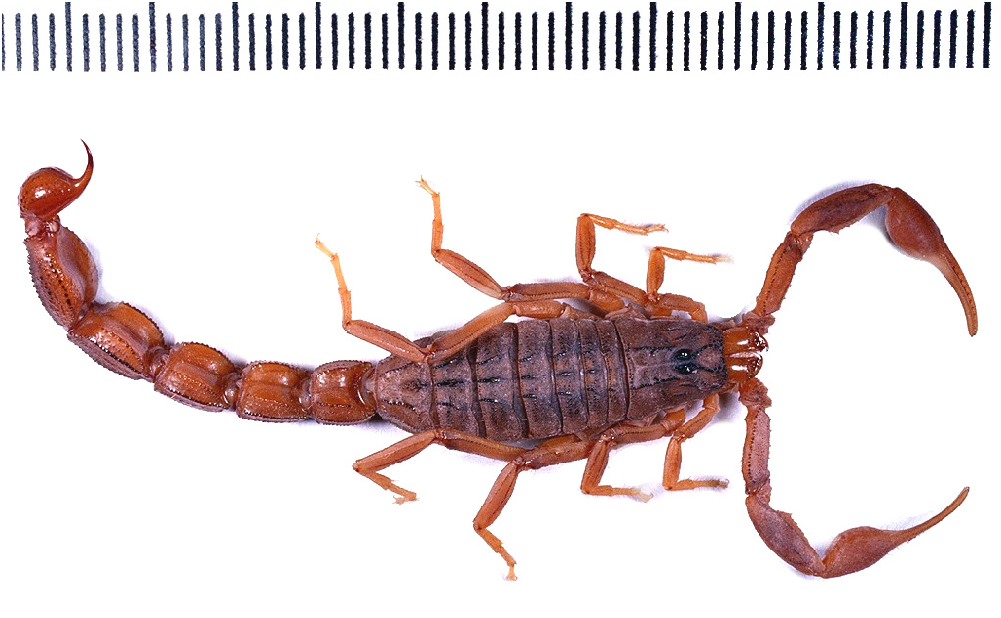
Hottentotta finneganae

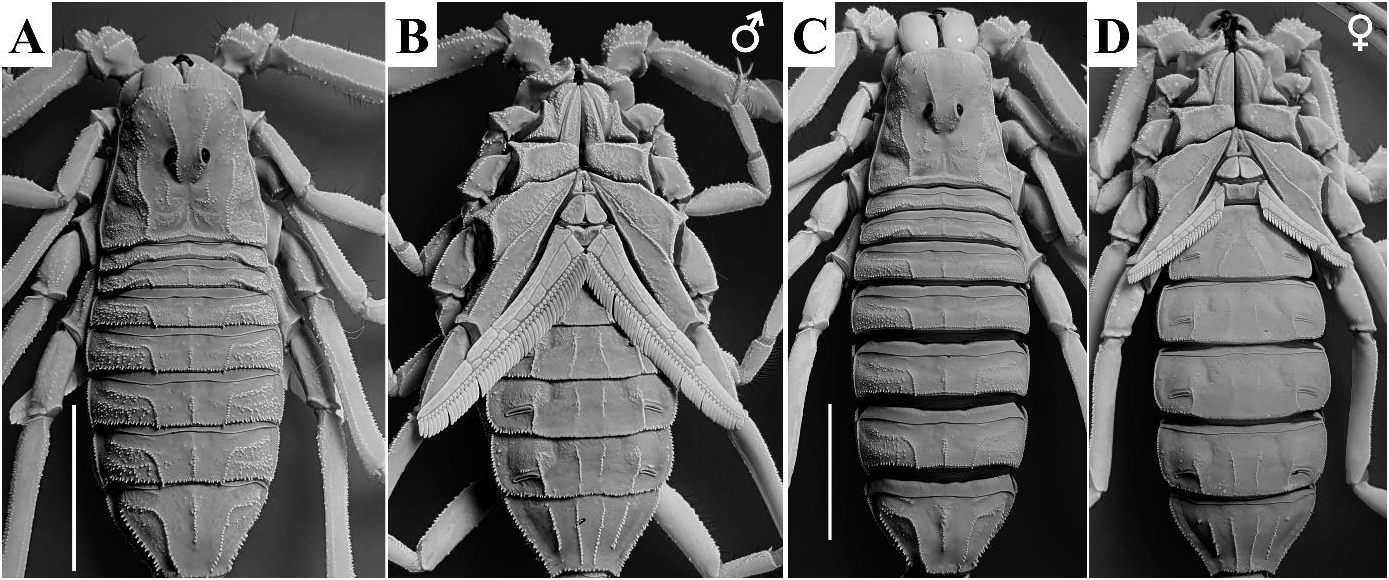
Apistobuthus susanae

== Marriage and family ==
Finnegan married Walter Campbell Smith in 1936. Campbell Smith worked in the department of mineralogy of the museum, and Finnegan was required to resign her post in order to marry, as a consequence of the Civil Service marriage bar that was then in place for women in the UK. Finnegan continued to use her maiden name in professional circles after marrying. Finnegan had a son and daughter, and seven grandchildren. Her husband died in 1988 at the age of 101 and Finnegan died on 20 June 1995.
