= Ananteris kuryi =

Scientific classification
- Domain: Eukaryota
- Kingdom: Animalia
- Phylum: Arthropoda
- Subphylum: Chelicerata
- Class: Arachnida
- Order: Scorpiones
- Family: Buthidae
- Genus: Ananteris
- Species: A. kuryi

Binomial name
- Ananteris kuryi Giupponi, Vasconcelos & Lourenço, 2009
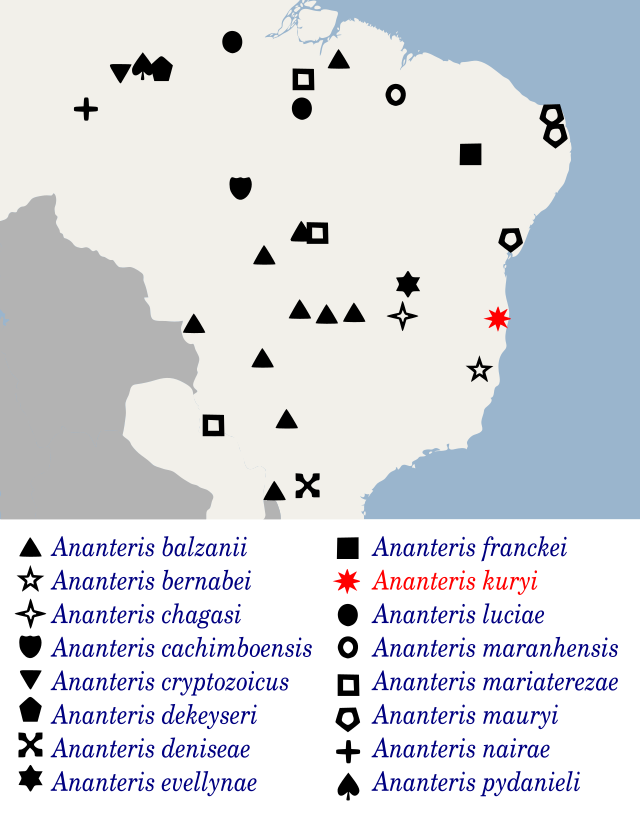

Species of scorpion

Ananteris kuryi is a species of scorpion in the family Buthidae. It was first described in a 2009 paper along with the species Ananteris chagasi and Ananteris bernabei. It is endemic to Bahia, Brazil.

== Etymology ==
The specific name was given in honour of Dr. Adriano Brilhante Kury.
