= Ananteris chagasi =

Scientific classification
- Kingdom: Animalia
- Phylum: Arthropoda
- Subphylum: Chelicerata
- Class: Arachnida
- Order: Scorpiones
- Family: Buthidae
- Genus: Ananteris
- Species: A. chagasi

Binomial name
- Ananteris chagasi Giupponi, Vasconcelos & Lourenço, 2009
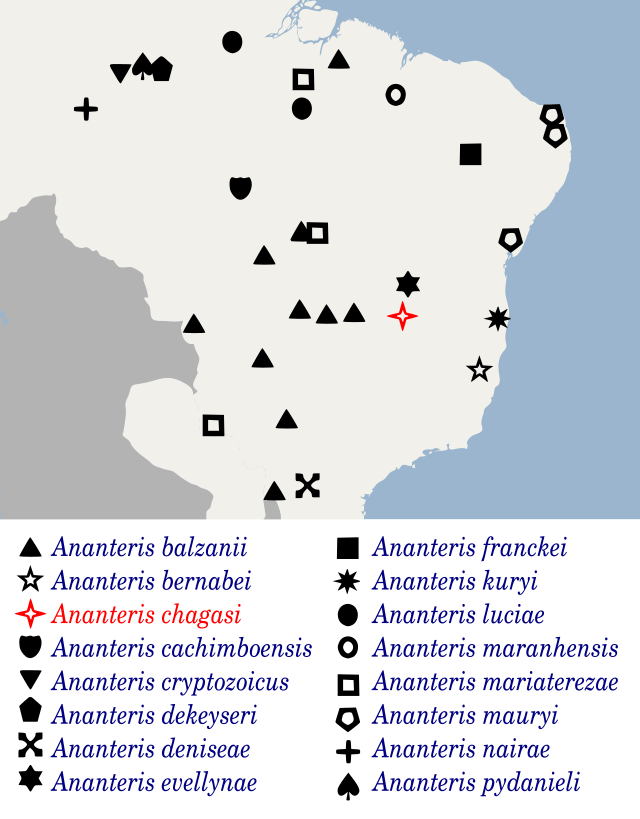

Species of scorpion

Ananteris chagasi is a species of scorpion in the family Buthidae. It was first described in a 2009 paper along with the species Ananteris kuryi and Ananteris bernabei. It is endemic to Minas Gerais, Brazil.

== Etymology ==
The specific name was given in honour of Dr. Amazonas Chagas Júnior.
