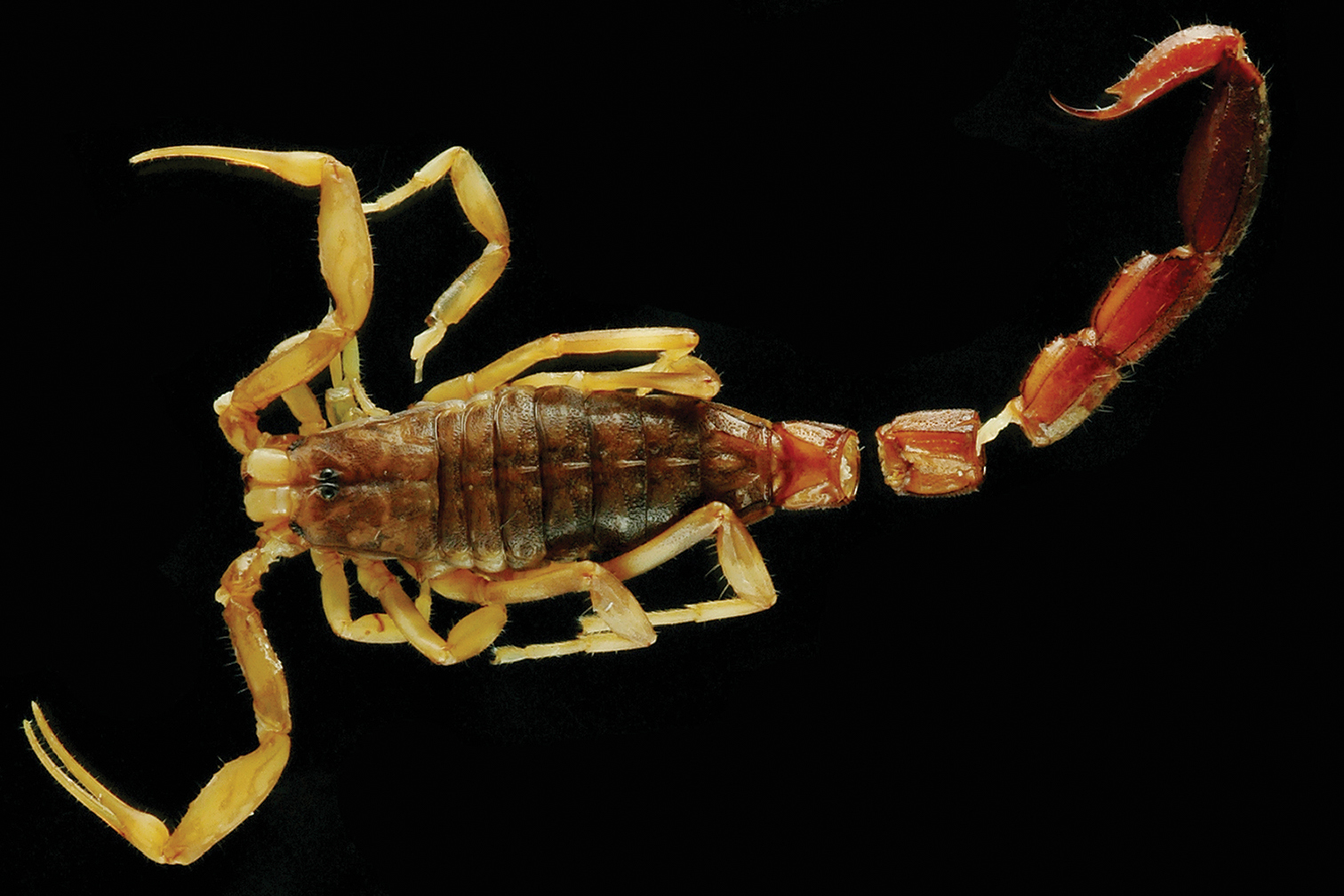

Scientific classification
- Domain: Eukaryota
- Kingdom: Animalia
- Phylum: Arthropoda
- Subphylum: Chelicerata
- Class: Arachnida
- Order: Scorpiones
- Family: Buthidae
- Genus: Ananteris
- Species: A. sabineae

Binomial name
- Ananteris sabineae Lourenço, 2001

= Ananteris sabineae =

Species of scorpion

Ananteris sabineae is a species of scorpion. It is closely related to Ananteris pydanieli, and is often described in relation to it. It has a pale pigmentation of its pedipalps and legs, and a carapace with darker pigmentation and less conspicuous yellow spots.
