= Belisarius ibericus =

Scientific classification
- Domain: Eukaryota
- Kingdom: Animalia
- Phylum: Arthropoda
- Subphylum: Chelicerata
- Class: Arachnida
- Order: Scorpiones
- Family: Belisariidae
- Genus: Belisarius
- Species: B. ibericus

Binomial name
- Belisarius ibericus Lourenço, 2015

Species of scorpion

Belisarius ibericus is a species of scorpion in the family Belisariidae.

== Etymology ==
The specific name refers to the Iberian Peninsula, where the species was first collected.
