= Ananteris bernabei =

Scientific classification
- Kingdom: Animalia
- Phylum: Arthropoda
- Subphylum: Chelicerata
- Class: Arachnida
- Order: Scorpiones
- Family: Buthidae
- Genus: Ananteris
- Species: A. bernabei

Binomial name
- Ananteris bernabei Giupponi, Vasconcelos & Lourenço, 2009
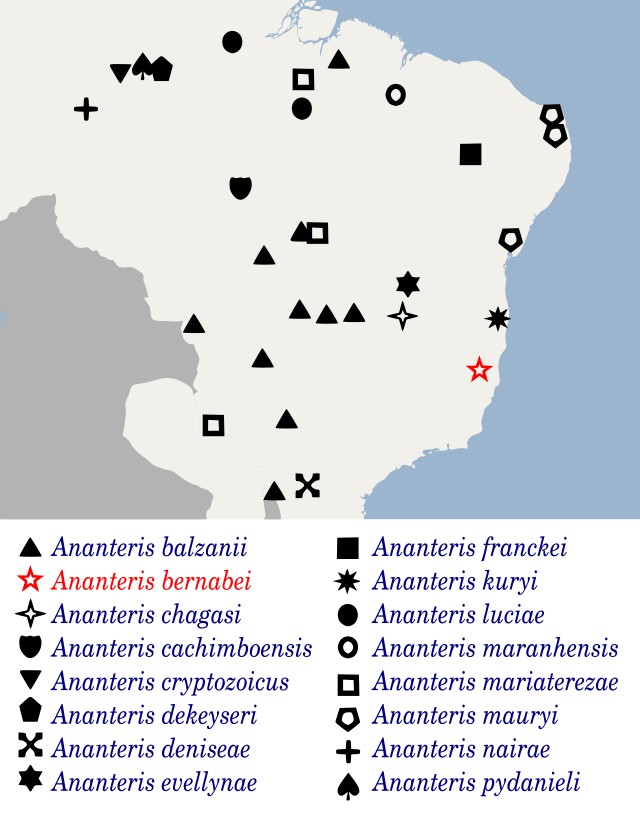

Species of scorpion

Ananteris bernabei is a species of scorpion in the family Buthidae. It was first described in a 2009 paper along with the species Ananteris chagasi and Ananteris kuryi. It is endemic to Espírito Santo, Brazil.

== Etymology ==
The specific name was given in honour of the biologist Tiago Nascimento Bernabé.
