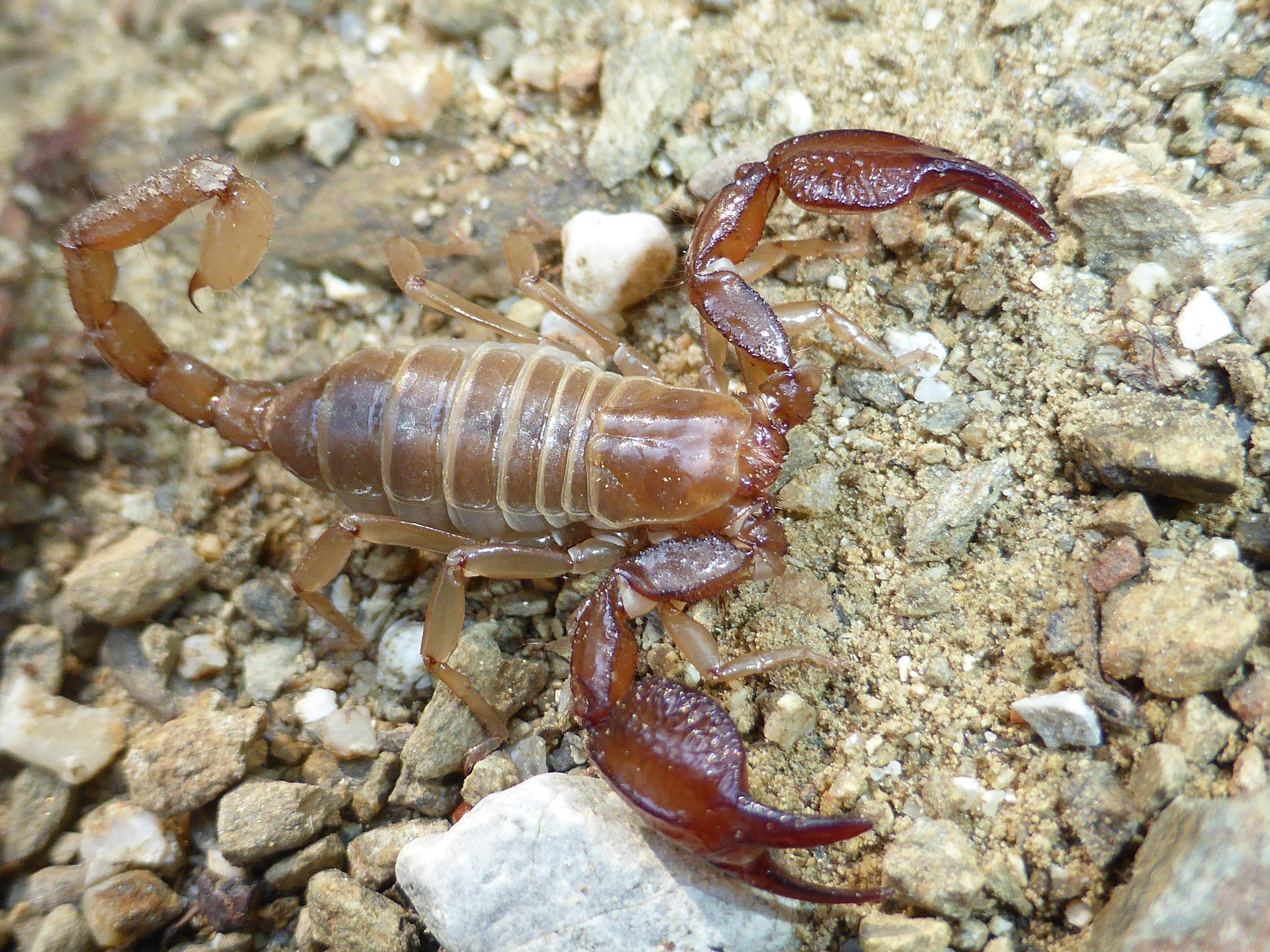
- Belisarius xambeui

Scientific classification
- Domain: Eukaryota
- Kingdom: Animalia
- Phylum: Arthropoda
- Subphylum: Chelicerata
- Class: Arachnida
- Order: Scorpiones
- Family: Belisariidae
- Genus: Belisarius; Simon, 1879

= Belisarius (scorpion) =

Genus of scorpions

Belisarius is a genus of scorpions belonging to the family Belisariidae. The species of this genus are found in Southern Europe.

== Species ==
There are two species:

- Belisarius ibericus Lourenço, 2015
- Belisarius xambeui Simon, 1879
