= Ananteris nairae =

Scientific classification
- Domain: Eukaryota
- Kingdom: Animalia
- Phylum: Arthropoda
- Subphylum: Chelicerata
- Class: Arachnida
- Order: Scorpiones
- Family: Buthidae
- Genus: Ananteris
- Species: A. nairae

Binomial name
- Ananteris nairae Lourenço, 2004

Species of scorpion

Ananteris nairae is a scorpion species found in Brazilian Amazonia. The species has the most western distribution of the species in Ananteris. The specific epithet refers to Nair Otaviano Aguiar.
