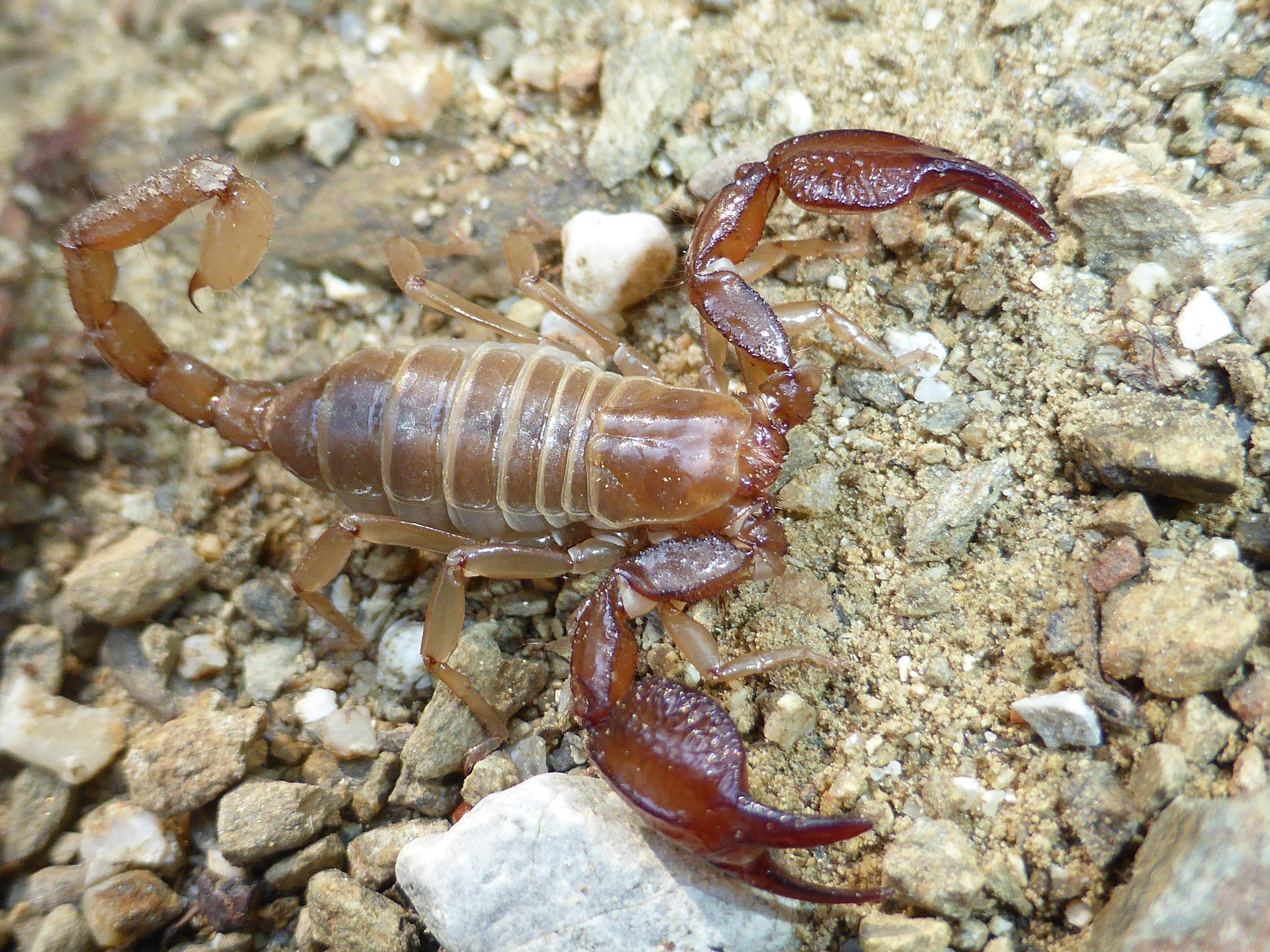

Scientific classification
- Domain: Eukaryota
- Kingdom: Animalia
- Phylum: Arthropoda
- Subphylum: Chelicerata
- Class: Arachnida
- Order: Scorpiones
- Family: Belisariidae
- Genus: Belisarius
- Species: B. xambeui

Binomial name
- Belisarius xambeui Simon, 1879

= Belisarius xambeui =

Species of scorpion

Belisarius xambeui is a species of scorpion in the family Belisariidae. It is endemic to the eastern Pyrenees.
