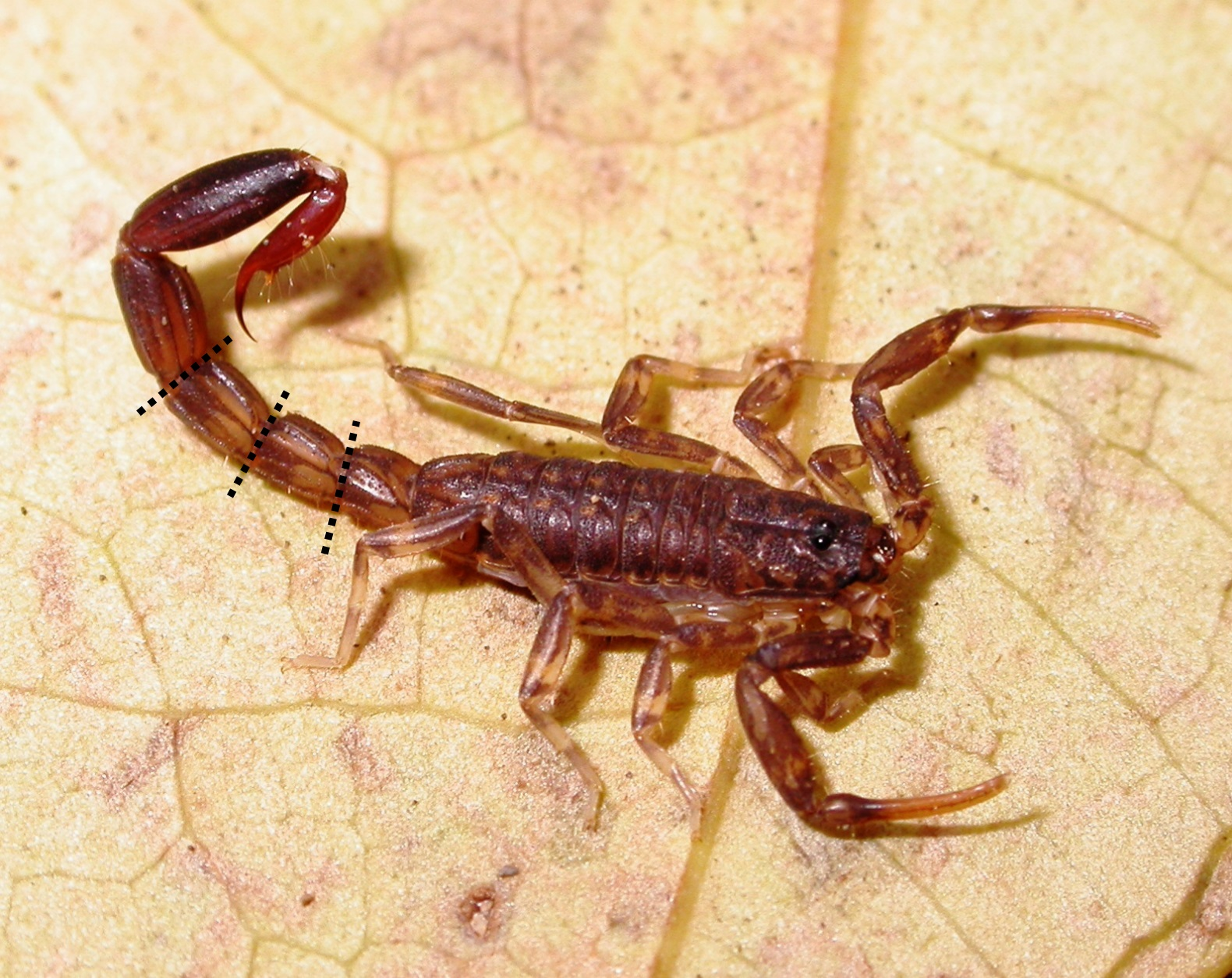

Scientific classification
- Kingdom: Animalia
- Phylum: Arthropoda
- Subphylum: Chelicerata
- Class: Arachnida
- Order: Scorpiones
- Family: Buthidae
- Genus: Ananteris
- Species: A. balzanii

Binomial name
- Ananteris balzanii Thorell, 1891

= Ananteris balzanii =

Species of arachnid

Ananteris balzanii is a scorpion species found in Argentina, Paraguay and Brazil. It is the type species of the Ananteris genus. The species will autotomize its Metasoma when threatened, and doing so decreases their ability to successfully subdue prey.
