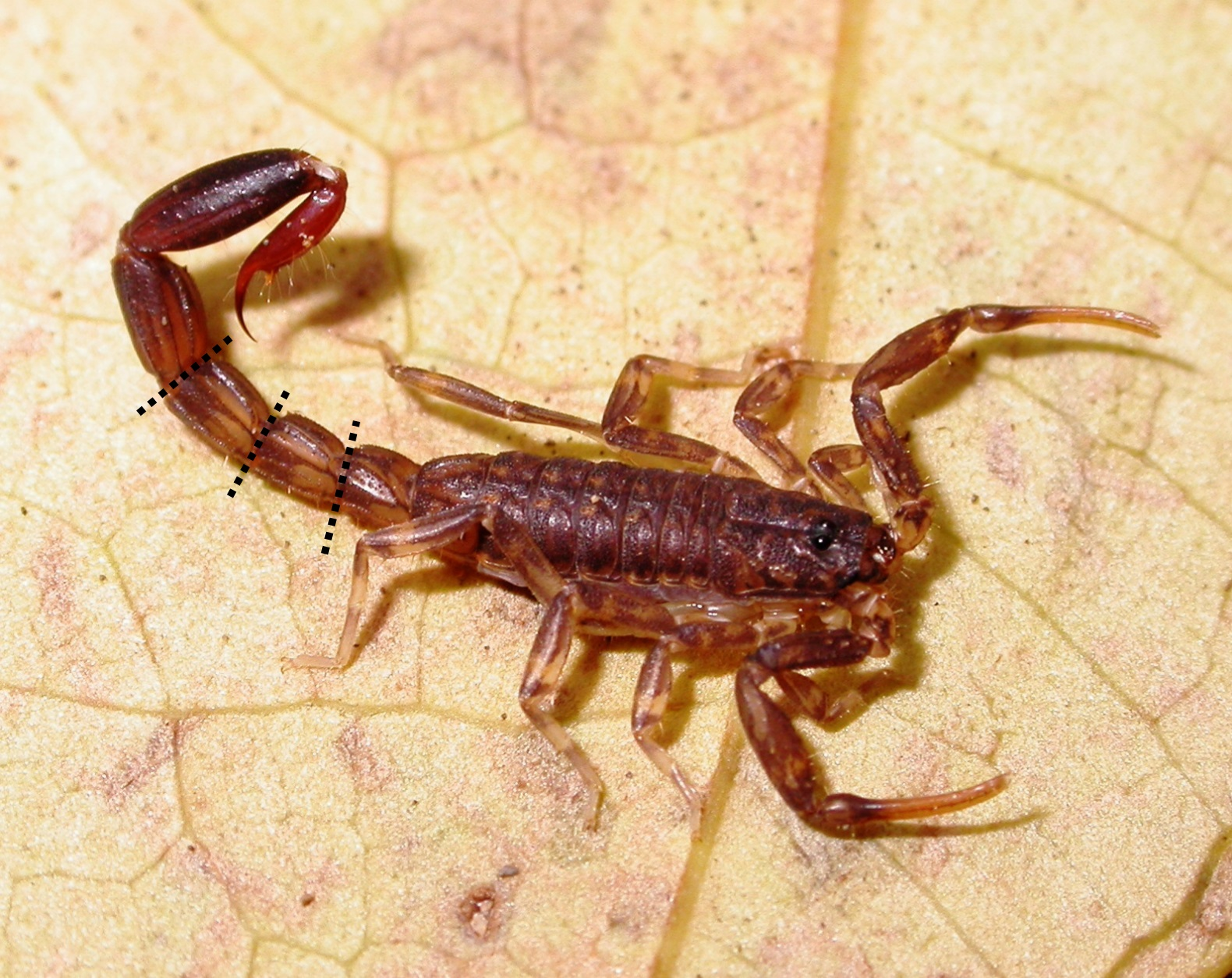
- Ananteris balzanii

Scientific classification
- Kingdom: Animalia
- Phylum: Arthropoda
- Subphylum: Chelicerata
- Class: Arachnida
- Order: Scorpiones
- Family: Buthidae
- Genus: Ananteris; Thorell, 1891

= Ananteris =

Genus of arachnids

Ananteris is a little-known genus of rare scorpions. Scorpions belonging to the genus can be found from Costa Rica to Paraguay.

== Species ==
Ananteris contains the following ninety-eight species:

- Ananteris arcadioi Botero-Trujillo, 2008
- Ananteris ashaninka Kovarik, Teruel, Lowe & Friedrich, 2015
- Ananteris ashmolei Lourenço, 1981
- Ananteris asuncionensis González-Sponga, 2006
- Ananteris balzanii Thorell, 1891
- Ananteris barinensis González-Sponga, 2006
- Ananteris bernabei Giupponi, Vasconcelos & Lourenço, 2009
- Ananteris bianchinii Lourenço, Aguiar-Neto & Limeira-de-Oliveira, 2009
- Ananteris bonito Lourenço, 2012
- Ananteris cachimboensis Lourenço, Motta & da Silva, 2006
- Ananteris camacan Lourenço, Giupponi & Leguin, 2013
- Ananteris canalera Miranda & Armas, 2020
- Ananteris capayaensis González-Sponga, 2006
- Ananteris caracensis González-Sponga, 2006
- Ananteris carrasco Lourenço & Motta, 2019
- Ananteris catuaroi González-Sponga, 2006
- Ananteris caucaguitensis González-Sponga, 2006
- Ananteris chagasi Giupponi, Vasconcelos & Lourenço, 2009
- Ananteris charlescorfieldi Lourenço, 2001
- Ananteris chirimakei González-Sponga, 2006
- Ananteris cisandinus Lourenço, 2015
- Ananteris claviformis González-Sponga, 2006
- Ananteris coineaui Lourenço, 1982
- Ananteris columbiana Lourenço, 1991
- Ananteris cryptozoicus Lourenço, 2005
- Ananteris cumbensis González-Sponga, 2006
- Ananteris curariensis González-Sponga, 2006
- Ananteris cussinii Borelli, 1910
- Ananteris dacostai Ythier, Chevalier & Lourenço, 2020
- Ananteris dekeyseri Lourenço, 1982
- Ananteris deniseae Lourenço, 1997
- Ananteris desiderio Lourenço, Giupponi & Leguin, 2013
- Ananteris diegorojasi Rojas-Runjaic, 2005
- Ananteris dorae Botero-Trujillo, 2008
- Ananteris ehrlichi Lourenço, 1994
- Ananteris elguapoi González-Sponga, 2006
- Ananteris elisabethae Lourenço, 2003
- Ananteris evellynae Lourenço, 2004
- Ananteris faguasi Botero-Trujillo, 2009
- Ananteris festae Borelli, 1899
- Ananteris franckei Lourenço, 1982
- Ananteris gorgonae Lourenço & Florez, 1989
- Ananteris guiripaensis González-Sponga, 2006
- Ananteris guyanensis Lourenço & Monod, 1999
- Ananteris infuscata Lourenço, Giupponi & Leguin, 2013
- Ananteris inini Lourenço & Ythier, 2025
- Ananteris inoae González-Sponga, 2006
- Ananteris intermedia Lourenço, 2012
- Ananteris kalina Ythier, 2018
- Ananteris karupina Lourenço, 2021
- Ananteris kayapo Lourenço, 2022
- Ananteris kuryi Giupponi, Vasconcelos & Lourenço, 2009
- Ananteris leilae Lourenço, 1999
- Ananteris lourencoi Ythier, 2024
- Ananteris luciae Lourenço, 1984
- Ananteris madeirensis Lourenço & Duhem, 2010
- Ananteris mamilihpan Ythier, Chevalier & Lourenço, 2020
- Ananteris maniapurensis González-Sponga, 2006
- Ananteris maranhensis Lourenço, 1987
- Ananteris mariaelenae Lourenço, 1999
- Ananteris mariaterezae Lourenço, 1982
- Ananteris martensi Lourenço, 2021
- Ananteris mauryi Lourenço, 1982
- Ananteris meridana González-Sponga, 2006
- Ananteris michaelae Lourenço, 2013
- Ananteris myriamae Botero-Trujillo, 2007
- Ananteris nairae Lourenço, 2004
- Ananteris norae González-Sponga, 2006
- Ananteris obscura Lourenço & Motta, 2021
- Ananteris ochoai Botero-Trujillo & Florez D, 2011
- Ananteris otavianoi Lira, Pordeus & Ribeiro de Albuquerque, 2017
- Ananteris palmari Botero-Trujillo & Noriega, 2011
- Ananteris paoensis González-Sponga, 2006
- Ananteris paracotoensis González-Sponga, 2006
- Ananteris pierrekondre Lourenço, Chevalier, Gangadin & Ythier, 2020
- Ananteris plataensis González-Sponga, 2006
- Ananteris platnicki Lourenço, 1993
- Ananteris polleti Lourenço, 2016
- Ananteris principalis González-Sponga, 2006
- Ananteris pydanieli Lourenço, 1982
- Ananteris riocaurensis González-Sponga, 2006
- Ananteris riochicoi González-Sponga, 2006
- Ananteris riomachensis Rojas-Runjaic, Portillo-Quintero & Borges, 2008
- Ananteris roraima Lourenço & Duhem, 2010
- Ananteris sabineae Lourenço, 2001
- Ananteris sanchezi González-Sponga, 2006
- Ananteris sepulvedai González-Sponga, 2006
- Ananteris singularis González-Sponga, 2006
- Ananteris sipilili Ythier, Chevalier & Lourenço, 2020
- Ananteris solimariae Botero-Trujillo & Florez D, 2011
- Ananteris surinamensis Lourenço, 2012
- Ananteris tresor Ythier, Chevalier & Lourenço, 2020
- Ananteris terueli Kovarik, 2006
- Ananteris tolimana Teruel & Garcia, 2007
- Ananteris turumbanensis Gonzales-Sponga, 1980
- Ananteris venezuelensis Gonzales-Sponga, 1972
- Ananteris volschenki Botero-Trujillo, 2009
- Ananteris zuliana González-Sponga, 2006
