= Ananteris pydanieli =

Scientific classification
- Kingdom: Animalia
- Phylum: Arthropoda
- Subphylum: Chelicerata
- Class: Arachnida
- Order: Scorpiones
- Family: Buthidae
- Genus: Ananteris
- Species: A. pydanieli

Binomial name
- Ananteris pydanieli Lourenço, 1982

Species of scorpion

Ananteris pydanieli is a species of scorpion from the Brazilian Amazon rainforest. It is a member of the family Buthidae.
