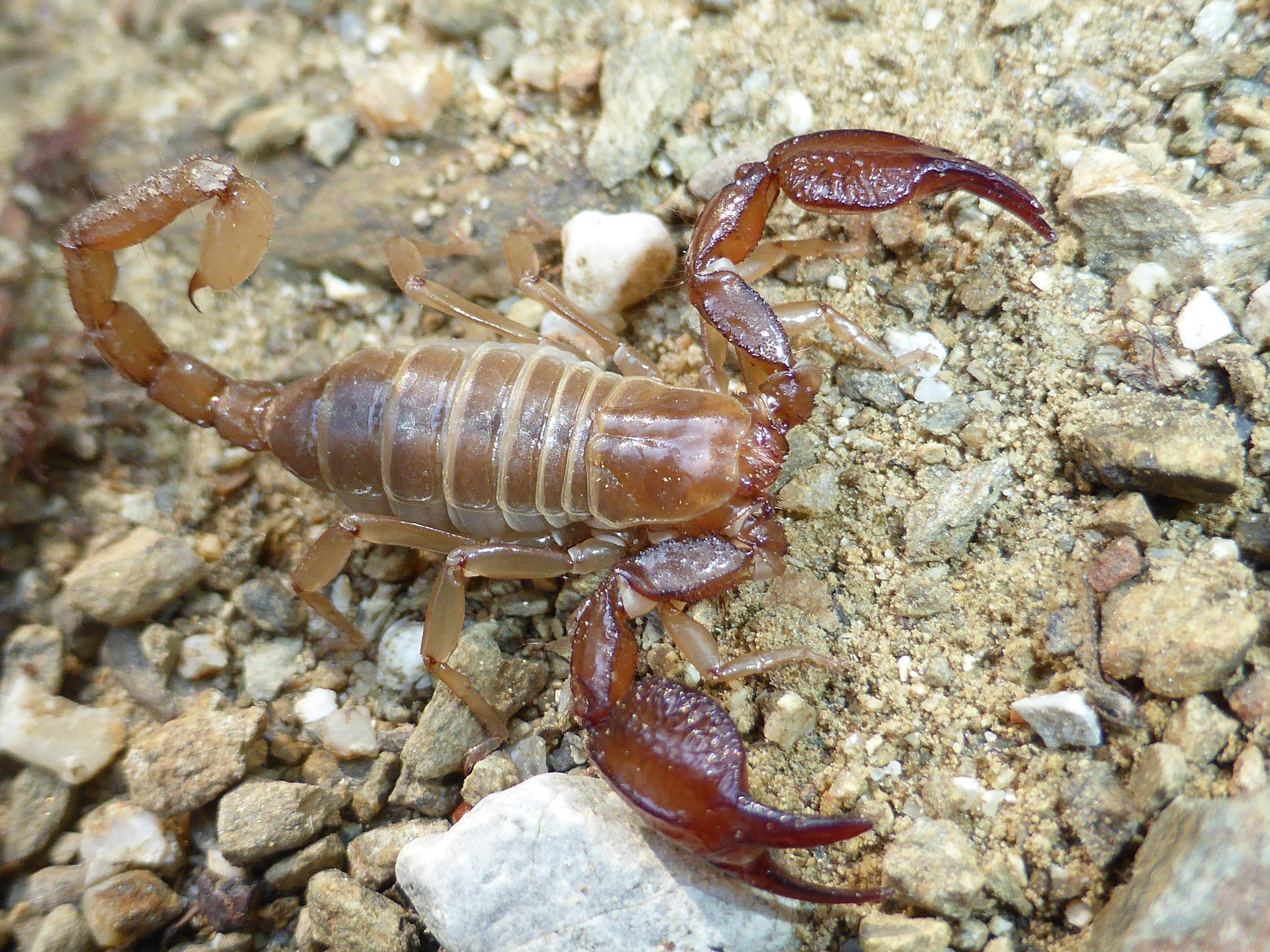
- Belisarius xambeui

Scientific classification
- Domain: Eukaryota
- Kingdom: Animalia
- Phylum: Arthropoda
- Subphylum: Chelicerata
- Class: Arachnida
- Order: Scorpiones
- Superfamily: Chactoidea
- Family: Belisariidae; Lourenço, 1998

= Belisariidae =

Family of scorpions

Belisariidae is a family of scorpions.

== Genera ==
There are two genera:

- Belisarius Simon, 1879
- Sardoscorpius Tropea & Onnis, 2020
