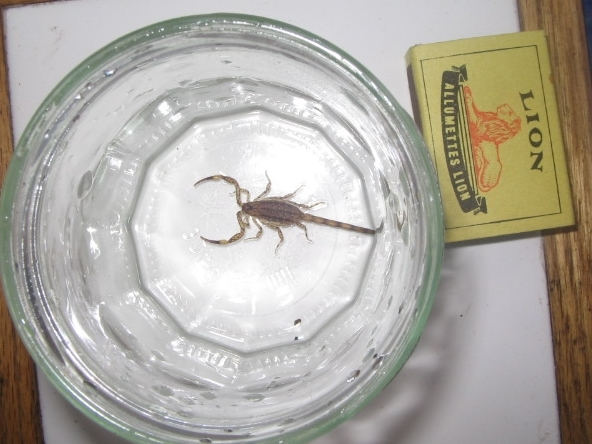
- Isometrus maculatus

Scientific classification
- Kingdom: Animalia
- Phylum: Arthropoda
- Subphylum: Chelicerata
- Class: Arachnida
- Order: Scorpiones
- Family: Buthidae
- Genus: Isometrus; Ehrenberg, 1828

Type species
- Scorpio maculatus De Geer, 1778

Diversity
- 29 Species

Synonyms
- Closotrichus Tikader & Bastawade, 1983; Buthus (Isometrus) Ehrenberg in Hemprich & Ehrenberg, 1828; Isometrus (Isometrus) Vachon, 1972; Isometrus (Raddyanus [sic]) Tikader & Bastawade, 1983; Isometrus (Closotrichus) Tikader & Bastawade, 1983

= Isometrus =

Genus of scorpions

Isometrus is a genus of scorpion belonging and being eponymous to the family Buthidae. Some species are currently assigned to the genus Reddyanus.

== Distribution ==
The species of this genus are found in south and southeast Asia and in Oceania, with the exception of Isometrus maculatus which is pantropical.

== Current species ==
- Isometrus adviteeya Deshpande, Gowande, Dandekar, Joshi, Bastawade & Sulakhe, 2024
- Isometrus amboli Sulakhe, 2020
- Isometrus anamalaiensis Deshpande, Gowande, Dandekar, Joshi, Bastawade & Sulakhe, 2024
- Isometrus antillanus Thorell, 1876
- Isometrus armatus Pocock, 1891
- Isometrus atherii Amir & Kamaluddin, 2008
- Isometrus atomarius Simon, 1884
- Isometrus bituberculatus Pocock, 1891
- Isometrus chinensis Karsch, 1879
- Isometrus devillei Becker, 1880
- Isometrus feae Thorell, 1889
- Isometrus formosus Pocock, 1894
- Isometrus garyi Lourenço & Huber, 2002
- Isometrus gracilis Thorell, 1876
- Isometrus hainanensis Lourenço, Qi & Zhu, 2005
- Isometrus infuscatus Pocock, 1891
- Isometrus isadensis Tikader & Bastawade, 1983
- Isometrus kovariki Sulakhe, Dandekar, Mukherjee, Pandey, Ketkar, Padhye & Bastawade, 2020
- Isometrus lao Lourenço & Leguin, 2012
- Isometrus liaqatii Amir & Kamaluddin, 2008
- Isometrus lithophilis Deshpande, Gowande, Dandekar, Joshi, Bastawade & Sulakhe, 2024
- Isometrus maculatus (DeGeer, 1778)
- Isometrus mesor Simon, 1884
- Isometrus palani Deshpande, Gowande, Dandekar, Joshi, Bastawade & Sulakhe, 2024
- Isometrus pallidimanus Karsch, 1879
- Isometrus papuensis Werner, 1916
- Isometrus phipsoni Oates, 1888
- Isometrus sonticus Karsch, 1879
- Isometrus tamhini Sulakhe, Dandekar, Padhye & Bastawade, 2020
- Isometrus thenmala Deshpande, Gowande, Dandekar, Joshi, Bastawade & Sulakhe, 2024
- Isometrus thorellii Koch & Keyserling, 1885
- Isometrus thurstoni Pocock, 1893
- Isometrus thwaitesi Pocock, 1897
- Isometrus weberi Karsch, 1882

== Former species ==
All species are assigned to Reddyanus.

- Isometrus acanthurus Pocock, 1899
- Isometrus assamensis Oates, 1888
- Isometrus basilicus Karsch, 1879
- Isometrus besucheti Vachon, 1982
- Isometrus bilyi Kovařík, 2003
- Isometrus brachycentrus Pocock, 1899
- Isometrus corbeti Tikader & Batawade, 1983
- Isometrus deharvengi Lourenço & Duhem, 2010
- Isometrus heimi Vachon, 1976
- Isometrus khammamensis Kovařík, 2003
- Isometrus krasenskyi Kovařík, 1998
- Isometrus kurkai Kovařík, 1997
- Isometrus loebli Vachon, 1982
- Isometrus melanodactylus (L. Koch, 1867)
- Isometrus navaiae Kovařík, 1998
- Isometrus petrzelkai Kovařík, 2003
- Isometrus problematicus Kovařík, 2003
- Isometrus rigidulus Pocock, 1897
- Isometrus tibetanus Lourenço & Zhu, 2008
- Isometrus vittatus Pocock, 1900
- Isometrus zideki Kovařík, 1994
