= List of scorpions of Sri Lanka =

Sri Lanka is a tropical island situated close to the southern tip of India. The invertebrate fauna is as large as it is common to other regions of the world. There are about 2 million species of arthropods found in the world, and still it is counting. So many new species are discover up to this time also. So it is very complicated and difficult to summarize the exact number of species found within a certain region.

The following list provide the scorpions in Sri Lanka.

== Scorpions ==
Phylum: Arthropoda
Class: Arachnida
Order: Scorpiones

Scorpions are easily identified by their large pedipalps and curved tail above the head. There are about 1,750 species of scorpions described within 13 families. Sri Lanka is home for 20 scorpions under 4 families and 9 genera. Whilst all scorpions are venomous, only one species native to Sri Lanka is fatal to humans.

=== Family: Buthidae - Fat-tailed scorpions ===
- Buthoscorpio sarasinorum – - Endemic
- Charmus laneaus – - Endemic
- Charmus saradieli – - Endemic
- Hottentotta tamulus - only dangerously venomous scorpion in Sri Lanka
- Isometrus maculatus
- Isometrus thwaitesi - Endemic
- Lychas srilankensis - Endemic
- Reddyanus basilicus - Endemic
- Reddyanus besucheti - Endemic
- Reddyanus ceylonensis - Endemic
- Reddyanus jayarathnei - Endemic
- Reddyanus loebli - Endemic
- Reddyanus ranawanai - Endemic

=== Family: Chaerilidae ===
- Chaerilus ceylonensis - Endemic

=== Family: Hormuridae ===
- Liocheles australasiae

=== Family: Scorpionidae ===
- Heterometrus gravimanus - Endemic
- Heterometrus indus
- Heterometrus serratus - Endemic
- Heterometrus swammerdami
- Heterometrus yaleensis - Endemic

== Gallery ==
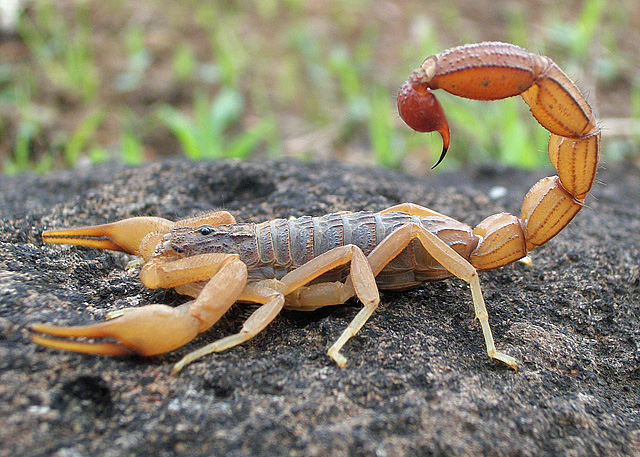
Hottentotta tamulus - only dangerously venomous scorpion, recently found from Sri Lanka

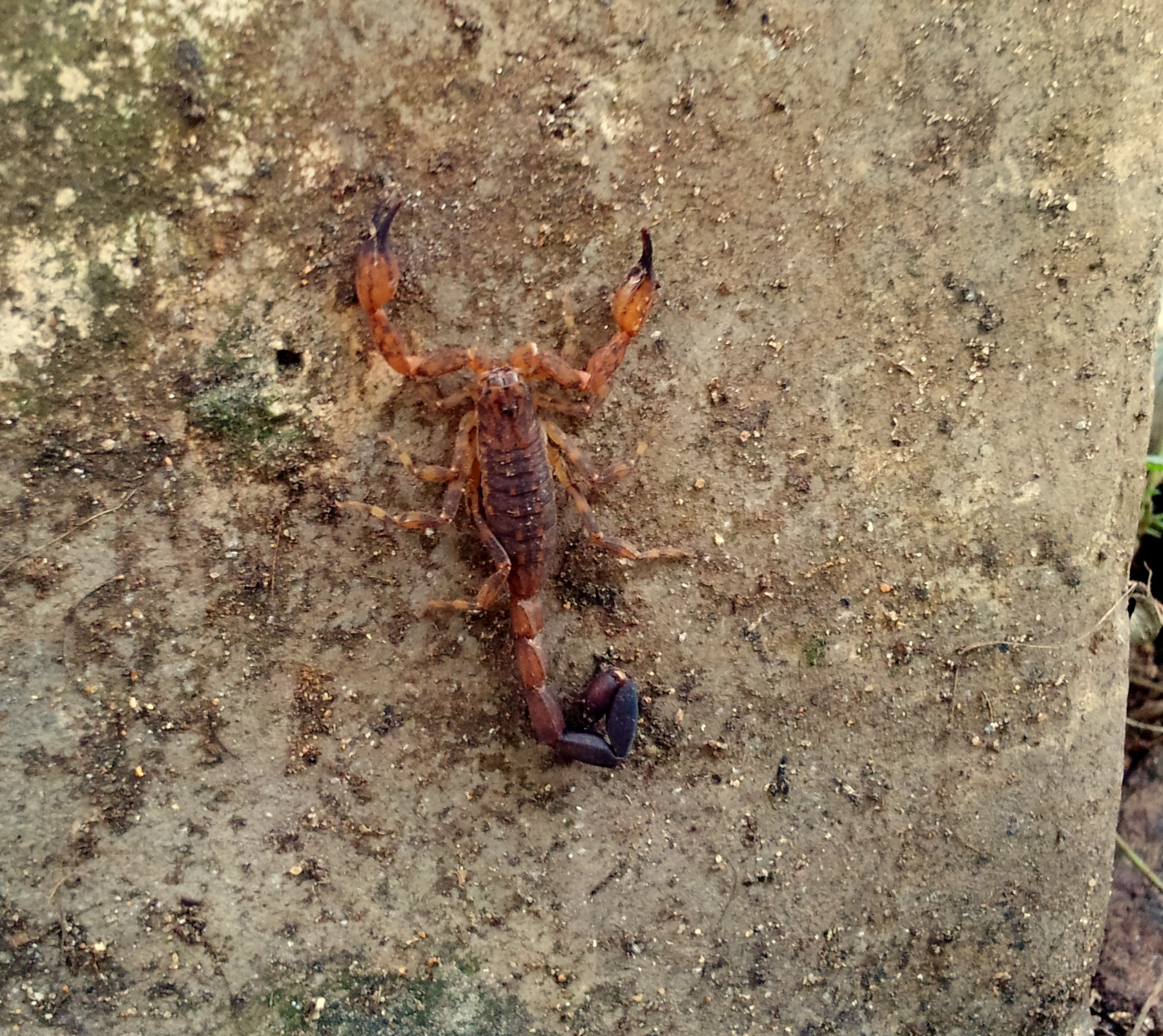
Isometrus besucheti

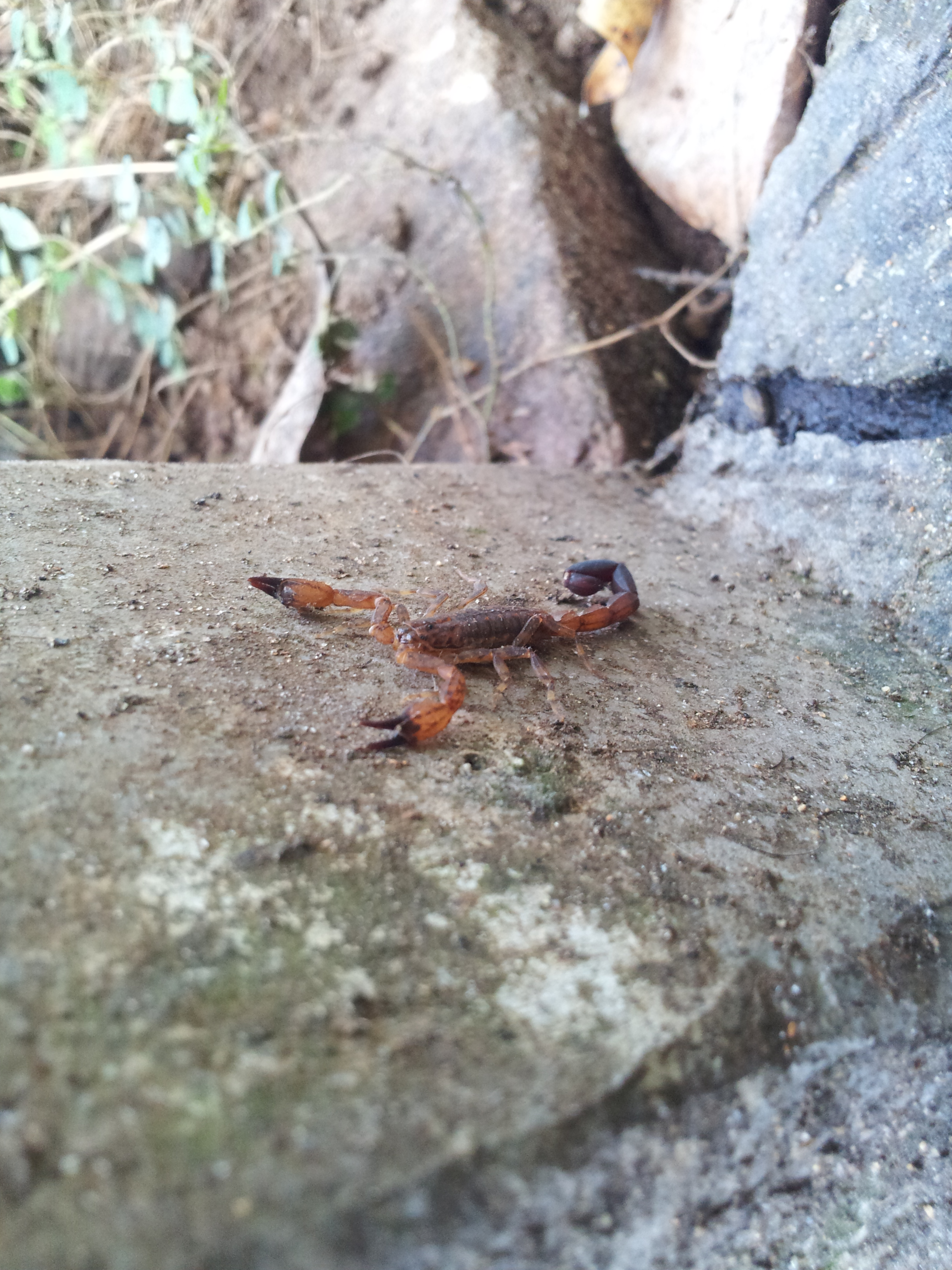

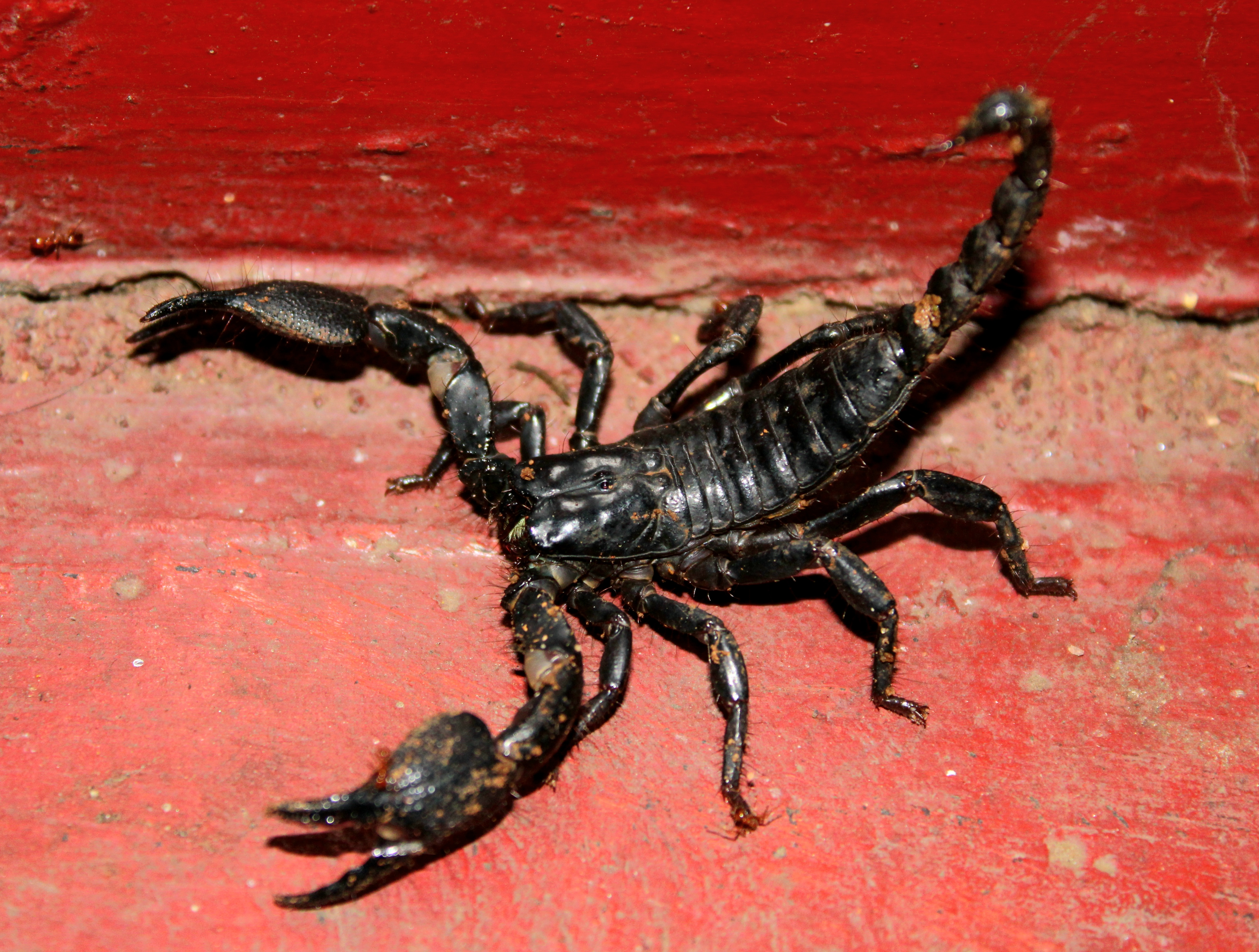
Srilankametrus sp.

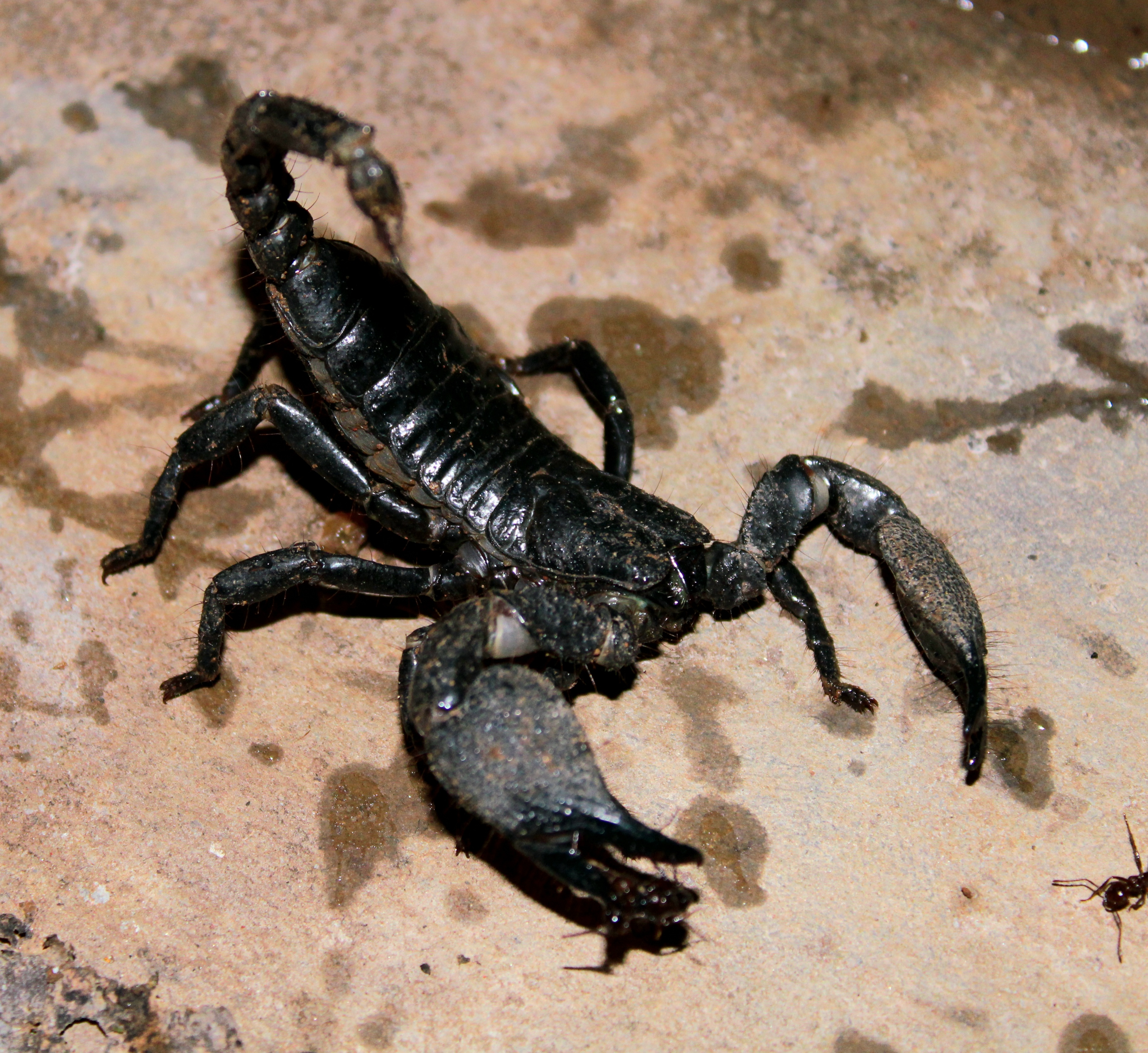
Srilankametrus sp.
