= OD1 =

Scorpion neurotoxin

Identifiers
| Organism | Odonthobuthus doriae |
| Superfamily | Long (4 C-C) scorpion toxin |
| Family | Sodium channel inhibitors |
| Subfamily | Alpha-toxin family |
| Amino acid sequence | GVRDAYIADD KNCVYTCASN GYCNTECTKN GAESGYCQWI GRYGNACWCI KLPDEVPIRI PGKCR |
| Molecular weight | 7204.8 Da |
| UniProt | P84646 |

Odonthobuthus doriae 1, also known as OD1, is an α-like toxin isolated from the venom of the Iranian yellow scorpion Odonthobuthus doriae. The toxin acts on voltage-gated sodium channels (VGSC) by inhibiting the fast inactivation of the channel and thereby increasing the duration and the peak amplitude of the sodium current.

== Etymology and source ==
Odonthobuthus doriae 1 (OD1) is named after being the first α-like toxin that was isolated from the venom of the Iranian yellow scorpion Odonthobuthus Doriae (O. Doriae) by Jalil et al. in 2005. O. Doriae is a species in the genus Buthus of the Buthidea family and is found in central and southern parts of Iran.

== Chemistry ==
=== Structure ===
OD1 is a polypeptide with a molecular weight of 7204.8 Da. It consists of 65 amino acids that are cross-linked by 4 disulfide bridges. Its primary sequence is GVRDAYIADDKNCVYTCASNGYCNTECTKNGAESGYCQWIGRYGNACWCIKLPDEVPIRIPGKCR, which is amidated at the C-terminus. The three-dimensional shape of OD1 follows a ββαβ motif that contains three antiparallel β-sheets, according to Karimi et al., formed by residues 2-9, 34-40 and 43-52 respectively, and one α-helix that is formed by residues 20-29. Residues 8-12 and 57-64 correspond to the reverse turn and the C-tail, respectively. Together, they form the NC-domain that is involved in the binding preference of genetically different VGSCs.

=== Family and homology ===
OD1 belongs to the sodium channel inhibitor family of the long (4 C-C) scorpion toxin superfamily. OD1 is also part of the α-toxin subfamily that can be divided into three subgroups: classical α-toxins, α-like toxins, and insect α-toxins, based on their binding properties. OD1 is classified as an α-like toxin that targets both mammalian and insect VGSCs.

The sequence of OD1 highly resembles the sequences of scorpion α-toxins, such as LqqIV (Leiurus quinquestriatus, 92%), LqhIIV (Leiurus hebraeus, 91%), BjαIT (Buthus judaicus, 79%), and BmK M1/BmK M2 (Buthus Olivierus martensii, 75%).

== Target ==
Being an α-like toxin, the neurotoxin OD1 targets the VGSCs of both mammals and insects. The insect VGSC para/tipE and mammalian VGSC Na(v)1.7 are particularly sensitive for the toxin. The VGSCs Na(v)1.5 and Na(v)1.3 are only affected by the toxin at very large doses. Analogs of the toxin also affect the Na(v)1.4 and Na(v)1.6 channels, and affect Na(v)1.7 channels with a higher effectivity.

== Mode of action ==
OD1 affects the fast inactivation of VGSCs, resulting in higher excitability and increased frequency of [[Action potential#:~:text=An action potential (also known as a nerve,specific cell rapidly rises and falls. [1]|action potentials]], which makes OD1-affected neurons fire more signals in the brain. The toxin affects VGSCs by binding to ion channel site 3 of domain IV, making it harder for the ion channel gate to close. As a consequence, the whole-cell sodium current has a larger maximum amplitude and a longer duration. When looking at individual VGSCs instead of the effect on the whole cell, the channels show fast fluctuations between the open and closed state of the individual channels for a prolonged period. The fluctuations in individual channels together can produce these changes in the whole-cell sodium current. Research models of OD1 suggest that the toxin produces these effects by interfering with the upward movement of the S4 helix, the part of the channel responsible for closing it after opening.

Alongside slower inactivation, faster recovery from inactivation is also present in Na(v)1.7 channels after toxin exposure. Additionally, OD1 can make Na(v)1.4, Na(v)1.6, and Na(v)1.7 channels activate at a lower required voltage than normal. The presence of the Beta3 subunit in the channel can change the effect of OD1 on VGSCs, with its presence in Na(v)1.7 channels reducing the inhibiting effect of OD1 on fast inactivation and counteracting the opening at lower voltages.

== Toxicity ==
OD1 injection in mice causes significant pain-related behaviours in areas exposed to the toxin due to spontaneous action potential firing in nociceptive neurons. Pain behaviors are elicited for up to 45 minutes after injection of the toxin in mice, including licking, flinching, and shaking of OD1-injected paws. This induced pain is specifically related to the Na(v)1.7 channels, who are heavily involved in pain disorders. The toxin can furthermore induce seizures after exposure of the brain to the toxin, with possible injury to the brain as a consequence. No median lethal dose (LD50) of the toxin has been established.

== Treatment ==
Administration of Na(v)1.7 inhibitors TTX and GpTx-1 can fully reverse OD1-induced pain behaviors in mice. Administration of Na(v)1.7 inhibitors TP1a, PF-04856264, and CNV1014802 can significantly reduce the pain. Additionally, seizures induced after injection of OD1 in rats are successfully counteracted by the administration of Carbamazepine, an anti-epileptic medication.

== Therapeutic use ==
OD1 currently has no known use as a therapeutic agent. Despite this, the toxin is used in biomedical research to study the mechanisms underlying diseases. To start, the toxin is used in studies related to pain-associated conditions. The Na(v)1.7 channel is implicated in the sending of pain signals, with OD1 acting as a toxin that increases the likelihood of its associated cells to fire. As a result, the effect of OD1 on these pain-implicated channels is speculated to mimic certain pain-associated conditions. The toxin has been used in research as a tool to induce pain in mice for the testing of pain-relieving medication.

Additionally, OD1's ability to increase a cell's excitability can induce seizures when injecting the toxin into the brain of rats, which has introduced interest in using the toxin to model epilepsy and resultant seizure-induced brain injuries in research studies.
