= Reddyanus problematicus =

Scientific classification
- Kingdom: Animalia
- Phylum: Arthropoda
- Subphylum: Chelicerata
- Class: Arachnida
- Order: Scorpiones
- Family: Buthidae
- Genus: Reddyanus
- Species: R. problematicus

Binomial name
- Reddyanus problematicus (Kovařík, 2003)

Species of scorpion

Reddyanus problematicus, previously known as Isometrus problematicus, is a species of scorpion in the family Buthidae. Found in India, the species exhibits distinct characteristics. In females, the total body length measures approximately 22 millimeters (mm). The pedipalps, legs, and segments of the metasoma display a coloration ranging from yellow to reddish-brown, accentuated by black spots.

== Etymology and distinguishing features ==
The specific epithet problematicus is derived from Latin and reflects the previous challenges encountered in identification of the species.

The species can be distinguished from others within its genus Reddyanus, which was previously considered a subgenus of Isometrus, based on specific features. It bears a close resemblance to Reddyanus basilicus, which is found in Sri Lanka. One of the distinguishing factors is the smaller size of R. problematicus compared to R. basilicus. Additionally, the metasomal segments of R. problematicus are shorter and broader in comparison. These differences make it relatively easy to differentiate between the two species.

One of the paratypes initially had the incorrect label of I. basilicus. The second paratype was initially identified as I. brachycentrus (later considered Reddyanus brachycentrus). Juveniles of R. brachycentrus may bear a resemblance to R. problematicus, though they can be distinguished by their narrower manus of pedipalps and the distinct spotting pattern on their legs and metasomal segments, which differs from that of adult R. brachycentrus individuals.

== Description ==
The total body length of the female R. problematicus is approximately 22 mm. As of 2003, the year of its description, the male R. problematicus is unknown and has not been described.

The metasoma, comprising five segments, presents specific features. Segment I has 10 carinae (ridge-like structures); segments II to IV have 8 carinae, and segment V has 5 carinae. The telson, located at the end of the metasoma, has a bulbous shape and lacks carinae. The metasoma and telson measure 12.9 mm in length.

The subaculear tooth is large and obliquely triangular in shape. Dorsally, it has three pairs of granules. R. problematicus displays a range of 9 to 12 pectinal teeth, which are sensory organs located on the ventral side of the body. These teeth serve various sensory functions in the species. The chelicera, a part of the arachnid anatomy related to feeding, displays a reticulated (net-like) pattern.

The pecten is characterized by 12 teeth in the holotype of R. problematicus, though paratypes of the species have been observed to possess 9 to 10 pectinal teeth.

The carapace (the hard upper shell covering the cephalothorax) lacks carinae but has prominent granules. The carapace, which is predominantly black and marked by a faint yellow pattern, is 2.7 mm in length and 2.8 mm in width.

The mesosoma (middle part of the body) is also predominantly black with a faint yellow pattern and is characterized by a granulated texture; it features a single median carina. On the ventral side of the seventh segment, there are four carinae accompanied by granules.

The femur and patella of the pedipalps bear complete carinae, providing structural support and strength. Additionally, these segments are weakly granulated, with small and sparse granules present. Both the femur and patella segments of the legs feature complete carinae and exhibit a granulated texture. Additionally, the legs are covered in fine hairs (hirsute) but lack bristle combs. The manus, which is the terminal segment of the pedipalps, is relatively smooth in texture. While traces of carinae may be observed, they are not prominent. Several granules may also be present on the manus, adding to its overall appearance. The movable fingers on the manus possess a cutting edge. The sixth cutting edge of the movable fingers bears one external granule, contributing to their functionality and grip.
