= ImKTX58 =

Scorpion neurotoxin

Identifiers
3D model (JSmol)	Interactive image
- InChI: InChI=1S/C183H283N57O52S8/c1-15-91(8)143(236-159(269)111(34-21-25-57-187)215-178(288)145(94(11)244)237-163(273)121(68-101-73-197-87-206-101)223-174(284)141(89(4)5)234-148(258)105(188)46-49-133(189)248)177(287)216-115(53-62-294-14)158(268)229-128-81-297-299-83-130(169(279)220-118(64-97-40-44-103(247)45-41-97)161(271)224-123(181(291)292)65-98-70-200-106-30-17-16-29-104(98)106)232-179(289)146(95(12)245)238-171(281)131-84-300-298-82-129-168(278)221-120(67-100-72-196-86-205-100)150(260)202-76-137(252)233-140(88(2)3)176(286)239-144(93(10)243)173(283)203-75-136(251)209-108(35-26-58-198-182(191)192)151(261)207-92(9)147(257)218-119(66-99-71-195-85-204-99)149(259)201-74-135(250)208-107(31-18-22-54-184)152(262)227-126(166(276)214-114(52-61-293-13)157(267)222-122(69-134(190)249)162(272)211-109(32-19-23-55-185)153(263)210-110(155(265)230-131)33-20-24-56-186)79-295-296-80-127(167(277)219-117(63-96-38-42-102(246)43-39-96)160(270)217-116(48-51-139(255)256)180(290)240-60-28-37-132(240)172(282)231-129)228-156(266)113(47-50-138(253)254)213-154(264)112(36-27-59-199-183(193)194)212-164(274)124(77-241)226-175(285)142(90(6)7)235-165(275)125(78-242)225-170(128)280/h16-17,29-30,38-45,70-73,85-95,105,107-132,140-146,200,241-247H,15,18-28,31-37,46-69,74-84,184-188H2,1-14H3,(H2,189,248)(H2,190,249)(H,195,204)(H,196,205)(H,197,206)(H,201,259)(H,202,260)(H,203,283)(H,207,261)(H,208,250)(H,209,251)(H,210,263)(H,211,272)(H,212,274)(H,213,264)(H,214,276)(H,215,288)(H,216,287)(H,217,270)(H,218,257)(H,219,277)(H,220,279)(H,221,278)(H,222,267)(H,223,284)(H,224,271)(H,225,280)(H,226,285)(H,227,262)(H,228,266)(H,229,268)(H,230,265)(H,231,282)(H,232,289)(H,233,252)(H,234,258)(H,235,275)(H,236,269)(H,237,273)(H,238,281)(H,239,286)(H,253,254)(H,255,256)(H,291,292)(H4,191,192,198)(H4,193,194,199)/t91-,92-,93+,94+,95+,105-,107-,108-,109-,110-,111-,112-,113-,114-,115-,116-,117-,118-,119-,120-,121-,122-,123-,124-,125-,126-,127-,128-,129-,130-,131-,132-,140-,141-,142-,143-,144-,145-,146-/m0/s1 Key: YZPIASKHVZBKSO-ABEJSSCSSA-N
- SMILES: N[C@@]([H])(CCC(=O)N)C(=O)N[C@@]([H])(C(C)C)C(=O)N[C@@]([H])(CC1=CN=C-N1)C(=O)N[C@@]([H])([C@]([H])(O)C)C(=O)N[C@@]([H])(CCCCN)C(=O)N[C@@]([H])([C@]([H])(CC)C)C(=O)N[C@@]([H])(CCSC)C(=O)N[C@@]([H])(CS3)C(=O)N[C@@]([H])(CO)C(=O)N[C@@]([H])(C(C)C)C(=O)N[C@@]([H])(CO)C(=O)N[C@@]([H])(CCCNC(=N)N)C(=O)N[C@@]([H])(CCC(=O)O)C(=O)N[C@@]([H])(CS4)C(=O)N[C@@]([H])(Cc1ccc(O)cc1)C(=O)N[C@@]([H])(CCC(=O)O)C(=O)N1[C@@]([H])(CCC1)C(=O)N[C@@]([H])(CS5)C(=O)N[C@@]([H])(CC1=CN=C-N1)C(=O)NCC(=O)N[C@@]([H])(C(C)C)C(=O)N[C@@]([H])([C@]([H])(O)C)C(=O)NCC(=O)N[C@@]([H])(CCCNC(=N)N)C(=O)N[C@@]([H])(C)C(=O)N[C@@]([H])(CC1=CN=C-N1)C(=O)NCC(=O)N[C@@]([H])(CCCCN)C(=O)N[C@@]([H])(CS4)C(=O)N[C@@]([H])(CCSC)C(=O)N[C@@]([H])(CC(=O)N)C(=O)N[C@@]([H])(CCCCN)C(=O)N[C@@]([H])(CCCCN)C(=O)N[C@@]([H])(CS5)C(=O)N[C@@]([H])([C@]([H])(O)C)C(=O)N[C@@]([H])(CS3)C(=O)N[C@@]([H])(Cc1ccc(O)cc1)C(=O)N[C@@]([H])(CC(=CN2)C1=C2C=CC=C1)C(=O)O

Properties
Chemical formula	C_{183}H_{283}N_{57}O_{52}S_{8}
Molar mass	4370.10 g·mol^{−1}

Related compounds
Related compounds	LmKTX10, ImKTx88
- Except where otherwise noted, data are given for materials in their standard state (at 25 °C [77 °F], 100 kPa). Infobox references

ImKTX58 (also known as kappa-Buthitoxin-Im1a) is a peptide toxin from the venom of the scorpion species Isometrus maculatus (also known as the lesser brown scorpion). It is known for its selective inhibition of Kv1.3 channels, on which it acts as a pore-blocker.

== Etymology ==
The name of ImKTX58 stems from its origin in the scorpion species Isometrus maculatus (Im), its action on potassium channels (K), its categorization as a toxin (TX), and its identification as the 58th clone in the Isometrus maculatus cDNA library (58). The protein is also referred to as kappa-Buthitoxin-Im1a, in line with the rational nomenclature system used for toxins produced by venomous species.

== Source ==
ImKTX58 is derived from the venom secreted by the glands of Isometrus maculatus (also known as the lesser brown scorpion) which belongs to the Buthidae family. It was first reported from Isometrus maculatus specimens found in Hainan, China.

== Chemistry ==
=== Structure ===
The entire cDNA of ImKTX58 comprises 404 base pairs and codes for a 60 amino acid precursor, including a signal peptide of 22 amino acids. The mature ImKTX58 protein consists of 38 amino acid residues and has a molecular mass of 4370.14 Da. It features an α-helix at the N-terminus and β-sheet framework at the C-terminus reinforced by cysteine residues and three disulfide bridges, which contribute to its stability.

Amino acid sequence of the mature protein: QVHTKIMCSVSRECYEPCHGVTGRAHGKCMNKKCTCYW.

=== Family and homology ===
ImKTX58 is a small polypeptide toxin from the α-KTX subfamily. It shares sequence homology with other potassium channel blockers from the same subfamily, such as LmKTx10 (74% similarity) and ImKTX88 (54% similarity).

== Target and channel specificity ==
ImKTX58 is a potent selective blocker of the Kv1.3 channel, which is a voltage-gated potassium channel essential in regulating neuronal excitability, and in the activation and proliferation of effector memory T cells. Electrophysiological recordings show that ImKTX58 effectively inhibits Kv1.3-mediated currents in Jurkat T cells (IC_{50} = 39.41 ± 11.4 nM) and HEK293T cells (IC_{50} = 10.42 ± 1.46 nM).

Moreover, ImKTX58 demonstrates a high selectivity for the Kv1.3 channel over other voltage-gated potassium channels, such as Kv1.1, Kv1.2, Kv1.5, as well as calcium-activated potassium channels SK2, SK3, BK, and voltage-gated sodium channels Nav1.4, Nav1.5, Nav1.7.

== Mode of action ==
ImKTX58 exerts a partially reversible pore-blocking effect by forming a protein complex with Kv1.3 channels. The amino acid residues at the C-terminus of the toxin, specifically Lys28, Asn31, Arg24, and Tyr37, are significant for the interaction between ImKTX58 and Kv1.3 channels. These residues act through mechanisms such as hydrogen bonding, salt bridges, and hydrophobic interactions. In particular, the Lys28 residue is crucial for effectively blocking the pore of the Kv1.3 channel. This pore blockage leads to increased cellular excitability, ultimately disrupting the regulation of the cell membrane potential. In neurons with higher Kv1.3 expression this results in a higher frequency of action potentials, a slight reduction in their amplitude, and a modest depolarization.

== Toxicity ==
The toxicity of ImKTX58 has not been thoroughly characterized. However, Isometrus maculatus has been identified as a species with venom of relatively weak overall toxicity.
