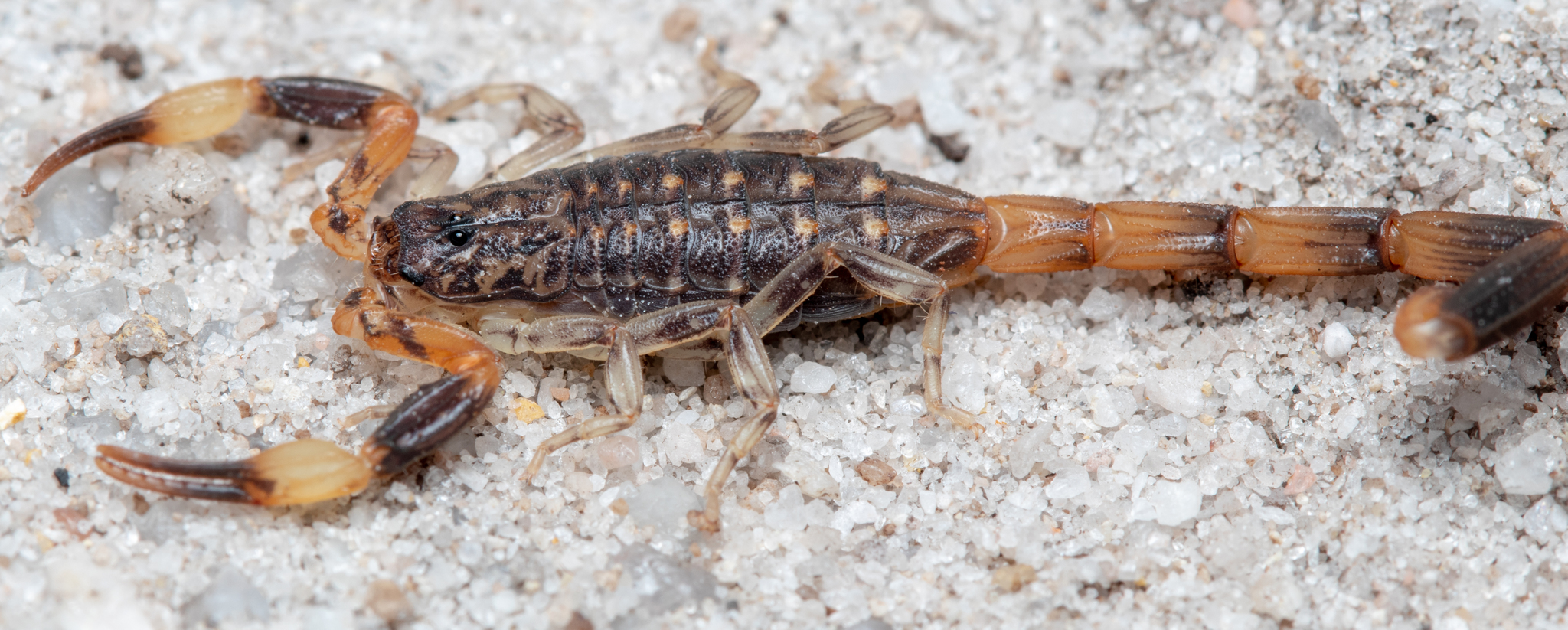

Scientific classification
- Kingdom: Animalia
- Phylum: Arthropoda
- Subphylum: Chelicerata
- Class: Arachnida
- Order: Scorpiones
- Family: Buthidae
- Genus: Reddyanus; Vachon, 1972

Type species
- Isometrus acanthurus Pocock, 1899

Diversity
- 33 species

Synonyms
- Isometrus (Reddyanus) Vachon, 1972; Isometrus (Raddyanus [sic]) Tikader & Bastawade, 1983

= Reddyanus =

Genus of scorpions

Reddyanus is a genus of buthid scorpions native to Oriental region from India, Sri Lanka, China: Tibet, to Melanesia. The genus was previously described as a subgenus of Isometrus.

== Description ==
They are medium sized buthid scorpions, where the adults range from 19 to 75 mm in length. Sternum type 1 is triangular in shape. Pedipalps are orthobothriotaxic. They have three to five pairs of lateral eyes. Tibial spurs are absent on all legs. Pedipalp movable finger consists with six rows of granules. Cheliceral fixed finger is with a single ventral denticle. Third and fourth legs consists with tibial spurs. Tibia and tarsomeres of legs I to III with setae are not arranged into bristle combs dorsally. Mesosoma has one median carina dorsally. Telson consists with subaculear tooth which is pointed or rounded. Males have longer metasomal segments and a wider pedipalp chela manus than females.

== Species ==
- Reddyanus aareyensis (Mirza & Sanap, 2010)
- Reddyanus acanthurus (Pocock, 1899)
- Reddyanus assamensis (Oates, 1888)
- Reddyanus basilicus (Karsch, 1879)
- Reddyanus besucheti (Vachon, 1982)
- Reddyanus bilyi (Kovarík, 2003)
- Reddyanus brachycentrus (Pocock, 1899)
- Reddyanus ceylonensis Kovarik, Lowe, Ranawana, Hoferek, Jayarathne & Stahlavsky, 2016
- Reddyanus corbeti (Tikander & Batawade, 1983)
- Reddyanus deharvengi (Lourenço & Duhem, 2010)
- Reddyanus feti (Kovarík, 2013)
- Reddyanus furai Kovarik & Stahlavsky, 2019
- Reddyanus heimi (Vachon, 1976)
- Reddyanus hofereki Kovarik & Stahlavsky, 2019
- Reddyanus jayarathnei Kovarik, 2016
- Reddyanus jendeki (Kovarík, 2013)
- Reddyanus khammamensis (Kovarík, 2003)
- Reddyanus krasenskyi (Kovarík, 1998)
- Reddyanus kurkai (Kovarík, 1997)
- Reddyanus loebli (Vachon, 1982)
- Reddyanus majkusi Kovarik & Stahlavsky, 2019
- Reddyanus melanodactylus (L.Koch, 1867)
- Reddyanus navaiae (Kovarík, 1998)
- Reddyanus neradi (Kovarík, 2013)
- Reddyanus petrzelkai (Kovarík, 2003)
- Reddyanus problematicus (Kovarík, 2003)
- Reddyanus ranawanai Kovarik, 2016
- Reddyanus rigidulus (Pocock, 1897)
- Reddyanus rolciki Kovarik & Stahlavsky, 2019
- Reddyanus schwotti Kovarik & Stahlavsky, 2019
- Reddyanus tibetanus (Lourenço & Zhu, 2008)
- Reddyanus vittatus (Pocock, 1900)
- Reddyanus zideki (Kovarík, 1994)
