= LmKTx10 =

Potassium Channel Toxin

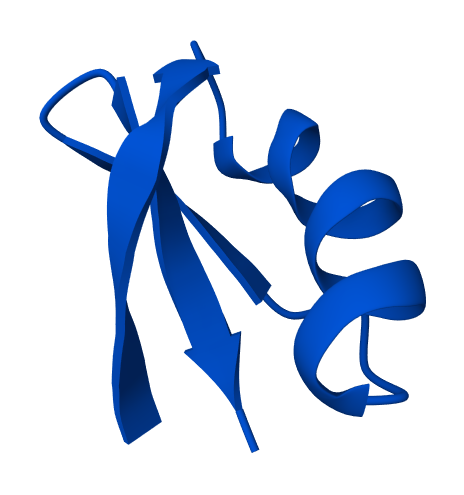

Identifiers
- Organism: Lychas mucronatus
- Symbol: LmKTx10
- Alt. symbols: alpha-KTx 12.5, Toxin alpha-KTx10
- UniProt: P0CH12
Search for
- Structures: Swiss-model
- Domains: InterPro

LmKTx10 is a peptide toxin from the venom of the scorpion Lychas mucronatus. The toxin acts as a pore blocker on potassium channels of the family Kv1. It has a higher selectivity for the Kv1.3 potassium channel (KCNA3), compared to other channels in the Kv1 family.

== Etymology ==
The Name LmKTx10 is derived from the initials of the species Lychas mucronatus, with "K" referring to the action on potassium channels, "Tx" denoting toxin, and 10 relating to the clone number in the cDNA library of the venom glands of Lychas mucronatus.

== Source ==
LmKTx10 is derived from the venom of the scorpion Lychas mucronatus. Lychas mucronatus is a species in the genus Lychas (family Buthidae). The scorpion is distributed in the Guangxi Zhuang autonomous region and the Chinese provinces of Hainan and Yunnan.

== Chemistry ==
=== Structure ===
The precursor nucleotide sequence of LmKTx10 is 180 base pairs long, including a 24 base pair 5'UTR and a 103 base pair 3'UTR. The mature LmKTx10 protein consists of 38 amino acid residues and includes six conserved cysteines (implying three disulfide bridges). This arrangement is characteristic of the cysteine-stabilized alpha/beta motif typical of alpha-KTx scorpion toxins, which stabilizes the N-terminal α-helix and two C-terminal β-sheets of the toxin.

The mature peptide sequence is:

QKHTDIKCSSSSSCYEPCRGVTGRAHGKCMNGRCTCYY

=== Homology and family ===
LmKTx10 belongs to the α-K channel toxin peptides (α-KTx) and displays a 48% sequence identity with α-KTx12.1, α-KTx12.2 and α-KTx12.3 as well as a 74% similarity to ImKTX58.

== Target ==
The main targets of LmKTx10 are potassium ion channels. It is part of the α-KTx family, which is known to have its main effect on Kv1 subfamily of potassium channels. LmKTx10 has high to moderate potency for the Kv1.3 KCNA3 potassium channel (IC_{50} of 28 nM). Comparing this channel potency to other potassium channels clearly shows high selectivity for Kv1.3 as the IC50 for Kv1.1 is 60 times higher (IC_{50} of 1.73 μM) and for Kv1.2 it is 450 times higher (IC_{50} of 12.63 μM).

== Mode of action ==
LmKTx10 restricts potassium ion flow by occluding the pore of potassium channels. This prevents cells from returning to their electrical resting state after activation, negatively affecting electrical signaling and cell function. Kv1.3 ion channels are highly expressed on effector memory T-cells, blocking these channels inhibits T-cell activation, effector responses, and therefore immune function.
