= OdK2 =

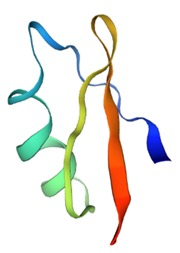
- OdK2 - Swiss-model

Identifiers
- Class: Small Proteins
- Superfamily: Scorpion toxin-like
- Family: Scorpion short chain toxin, potassium channel inhibitor
- Protein: P0C909
- Species: Odontobuthus doriae

OdK2 is a toxin found in the venom of Odonthobuthus doriae, a species of scorpion found in central and southern Iran. It belongs to the α-KTx family, and selectively blocks the voltage-gated potassium channel Kv1.3 (KCNA3).

== Etymology ==
OdK2 is an acronym for the species of origin, the substrate of the ion channel the toxin targets, and the chronological order of its discovery. OdK1 was the first toxin isolated from the same species’ venom, targeting the Kv1.2 channel (KCNA2).

== Chemistry ==
OdK2 is a relatively small peptide with 38 amino acids and a monoisotopic mass of 4079.869 Da (C_{167}H_{278}N_{54}O_{49}S_{8}).

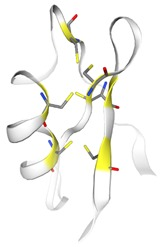
OdK2-Disulphide bonds marked. Cys8-Cys-28, Cys14-Cys-33, Cys18-Cys-35 Swiss-model, P0C909

According to the unified nomenclature for short-chain peptides isolated from scorpion venoms, Odk2 can be classified in the second α-KTx family, selectively blocking voltage-gated potassium channels.

OdK2 is further classified as α-KTx 3.11 as it presents significant sequence homology with toxins from the α-KTx 3.x sub-family, especially Bs6, Agitoxin and Kaliotoxin. This fact suggests that frequently observed structural motifs present on other toxins of the same subfamily, such as the α/β scaffold and the typical disulfide pairing, can be assumed for OdK2 as well.

The presence of Lys27 and Phe25 residues, crucial for the α-KTx3-Kv1.3 interaction, is another highly conserved feature among α-KTx toxins.

Gly-Val-Pro-Thr-Asp-Val-Lys-Cys-Arg-Gly-Ser-Pro-Gln-Cys-Ile-Gln-Pro-Cys-Lys-Asp-Ala-Gly-Met-Arg-Phe-Gly-Lys-Cys-Met-Asn-Gly-Lys-Cys-His-Cys-Thr-Pro-Lys

== Mode of action ==
OdK2 is one of the many Kv1.3 channel blockers found in the scorpion’s venom. There is evidence suggesting that their binding mechanism to Kv1.3 is governed by electrostatic forces, exerted between specific amino acid residues in the toxins and in the pore regions of the channel’s subunits. However, the precise OdK2 blocking mechanism remains unknown.

Two prominent features of OdK2 are its blocking potency (IC_{50} value of 7.27 ± 2.7 nM) and its high selectivity for Kv1.3 channels, illustrated by 95% inhibition at a concentration of 35 nM, but no observed effect in other voltage-gated potassium channels. Amino acid residues only found in Kv1.3 pore regions and not in other Kv1.x channel family members, could potentially explain the high selectivity of OdK2.

Kv1.3 channels are delayed rectifier channels. Their main function is to repolarize the membrane, counterbalancing the depolarizing effect of calcium influx. As the precise modulation of intracellular calcium concentration is critical for the cell's activation and proliferation, occlusion of the potassium channels has a strong effect on the cell’s calcium signaling pathway, indirectly disrupting its normal function.

== Toxicity ==
Observed effects of OdK2 infection include local pain, muscle paralysis and may lead to inflammation and necrosis.
