= Isometrus garyi =

Scientific classification
- Kingdom: Animalia
- Phylum: Arthropoda
- Subphylum: Chelicerata
- Class: Arachnida
- Order: Scorpiones
- Family: Buthidae
- Genus: Isometrus
- Species: I. garyi

Binomial name
- Isometrus garyi Lourenço et Huber, 2002

Species of scorpion

Isometrus garyi is a species of scorpion in the family Buthidae. It is endemic to Sri Lanka. Its poison is not known to be lethal to humans.
