= Isometrus kovariki =

Scientific classification
- Domain: Eukaryota
- Kingdom: Animalia
- Phylum: Arthropoda
- Subphylum: Chelicerata
- Class: Arachnida
- Order: Scorpiones
- Family: Buthidae
- Genus: Isometrus
- Species: I. kovariki

Binomial name
- Isometrus kovariki S Sulakhe, 2020

Species of scorpion in the family Buthidae

Isometrus kovariki is a species of scorpion in the family Buthidae. It was identified in and currently found only in a small region of Southern Karnataka, in an Acacia auriculiformis plantation, and it is closely related to Isometrus thurstoni, a species of scorpion endemic to the Western Ghats region of India.

== Description ==
Isometrus kovariki is light yellowish-brown with variegated with blackish brown stripes, and a ventral portion that is uniformly yellow with a few dark spots. The telson is uniformly brown in colour.

There is some sexual dimorphism; along with a few differences in the genital operculum, males are on average 51.3 ± 6.1mm in length and females are on average 42.3 ± 1.9mm in length, both longer than their close relative Isometrus thurstoni.

== Habitat and behavior ==
This species has currently been identified only in a plantation in the outskirts of Bangalore. Their true distribution is currently unknown.

In the area they were found in, Isometrus kovariki feed on prey such as cockroaches and crickets, using the bark and litter of trees to ambush their prey. They are most active during summer (February–June), show slightly diminished activity during the Indian monsoon seasons (June–October) and are inactive during winter (December–January).
