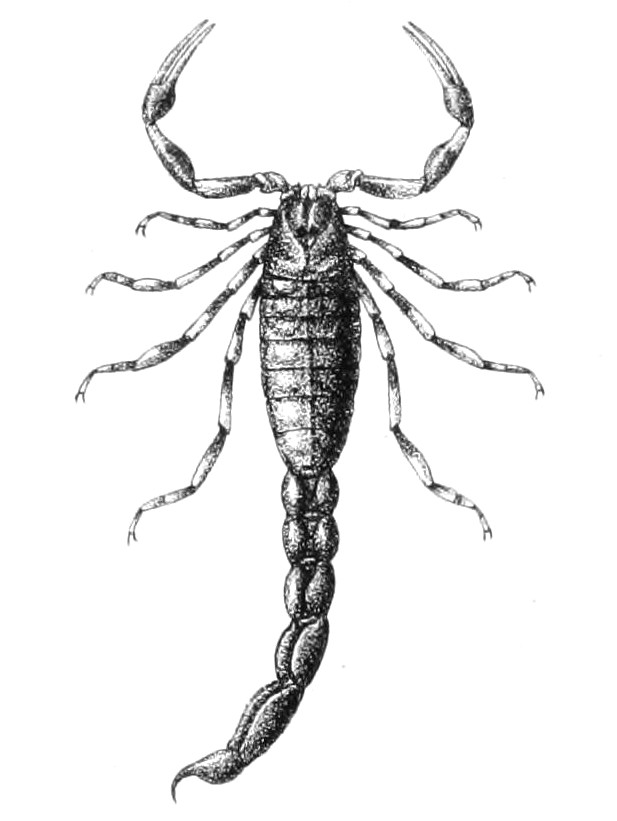
- Charmus laneaus

Scientific classification
- Domain: Eukaryota
- Kingdom: Animalia
- Phylum: Arthropoda
- Subphylum: Chelicerata
- Class: Arachnida
- Order: Scorpiones
- Family: Buthidae
- Genus: Charmus; Karsch, 1879

Type species
- Heterocharmus cinctipes Pocock, 1892

Diversity
- 5 species

Synonyms
- Heterocharmus Pocock, 1892

= Charmus (scorpion) =

Genus of scorpions

Charmus is a genus of buthid scorpions native to India and Sri Lanka.

== Taxonomy ==
In 1892, Pocock proposed a new buthid genus Heterocharmus with a new species, Heterocharmus cinctipes. Then in 1899, Kraepelin moved the genus Charmus to the family Buthidae and cited that Heterocharmus cinctipes should be a synonym of Charmus ianeus in his “Das Tierreich”. In 1917, Birula proposed a new family Vaejovidae and a new sub-family Charminae for the species by ignoring the publications of both Pocock and Kraepelin. However Birula's work was poorly known due to being Russian, until 1965 when an English version was prepared by the Israel Program for Scientific Translations. After the translation, in 1966 Sreenivasa-Reddy provided a redescription of new species Charmus indicus discussed further about the taxonomic position of the genus Charmus. In the meantime, he also made reference to several specimens deposited in the Muséum National d’Histoire Naturelle, Paris and named a new species Charmus annulipes with the work done by Eugène Simon around 1899/1900. But, the name was not subsequently considered to be valid. In 2000, his work has been revised by Lourenço and C. annulipes assigned as a new species, Charmus brignoli.

== Description ==
Adult male is about 12 mm and female is 23.5 mm. Sternum type 1 is subpentagonal, long and exhibiting horizontal compression. Pedipalps trichobothrial pattern Aα and femur trichobothrium located dorsally. Movable pedipalp is longer than manus. Pectines are with or without fulcra. Dentate margin of the pedipalp chela movable finger consists with distinct granules which are divided into 8 to 9 linear rows, and apical rows of 4 to 6 granules. Cheliceral fixed finger is armed with two denticles on ventrum. Carapace is granular without carinae. Metasomal segments IV to V are punctate without a developed carinae. Telson vesicle is punctate, without the subaculear tooth. Pedipalps, metasoma and telson are densely hirsute. Third and fourth legs comprised with well developed long tibial spurs, whereas the first and second tarsomeres are with ventral setae.

== Species ==
- Charmus brignolii Lourenço, 2000
- Charmus indicus Hirst, 1915
- Charmus laneaus Karsch, 1879
- Charmus saradieli Kovarik, Lowe, Ranawana, Hoferek & Jayarathne 2016
- Charmus sinhagadensis Tikader & Bastawade, 1983
