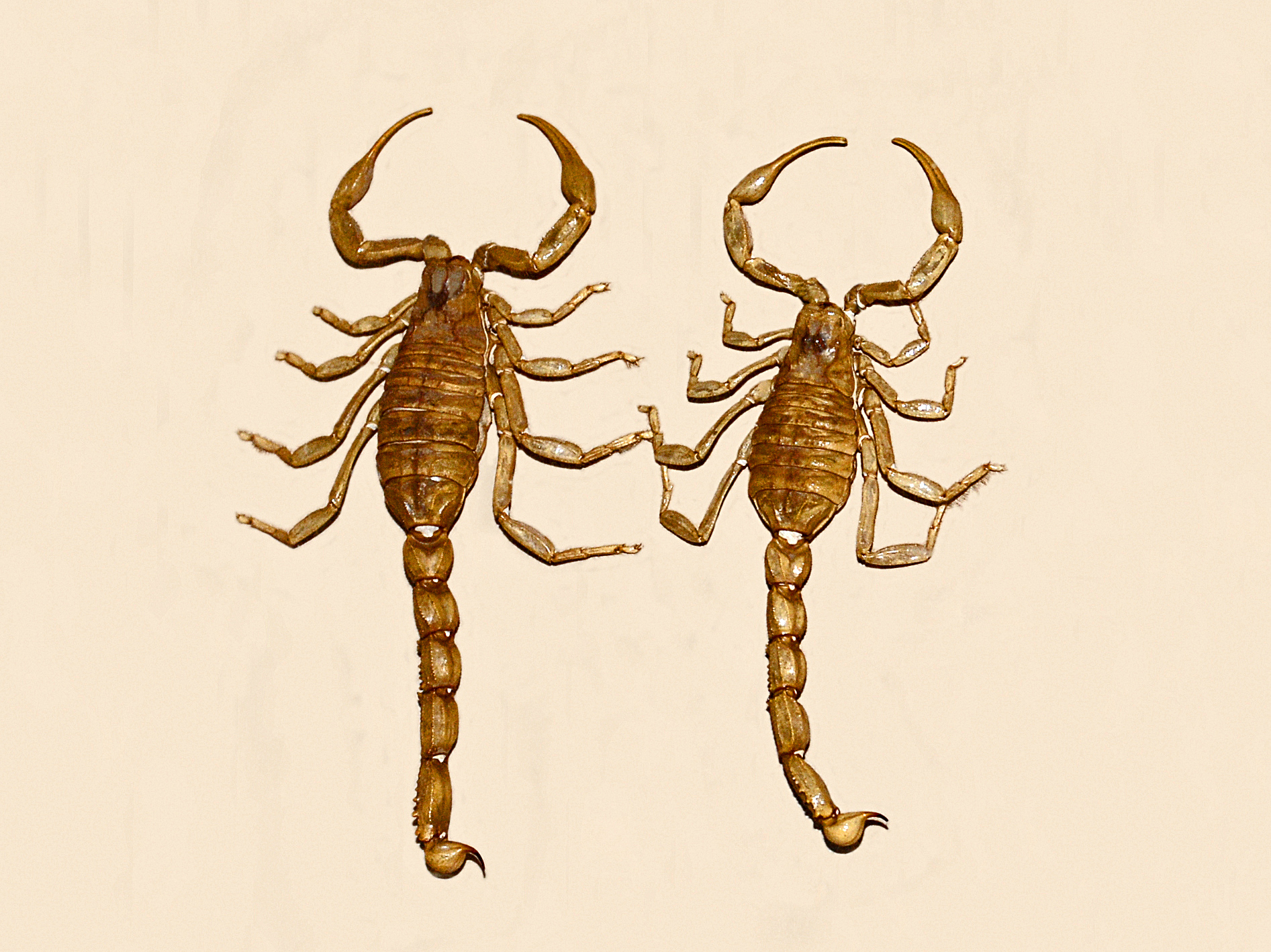
- Odontobuthus doriae

Scientific classification
- Kingdom: Animalia
- Phylum: Arthropoda
- Subphylum: Chelicerata
- Class: Arachnida
- Order: Scorpiones
- Family: Buthidae
- Genus: Odontobuthus; Vachon, 1950

= Odontobuthus =

Genus of scorpions

Odontobuthus is a genus of scorpions of the family Buthidae.

== Species ==
- Odontobuthus bidentatus Lourenço & Pézier, 2002
- Odontobuthus doriae (Thorell, 1876)
- Odontobuthus odonturus (Pocock, 1897)
