= Isometrus isadensis =

Scientific classification
- Domain: Eukaryota
- Kingdom: Animalia
- Phylum: Arthropoda
- Subphylum: Chelicerata
- Class: Arachnida
- Order: Scorpiones
- Family: Buthidae
- Genus: Isometrus
- Species: I. isadensis

Binomial name
- Isometrus isadensis (Tikader & Batawade, 1983)

Species of scorpion

Isometrus isadensis is a species of scorpion in the family Buthidae.
