= ImKTx88 =

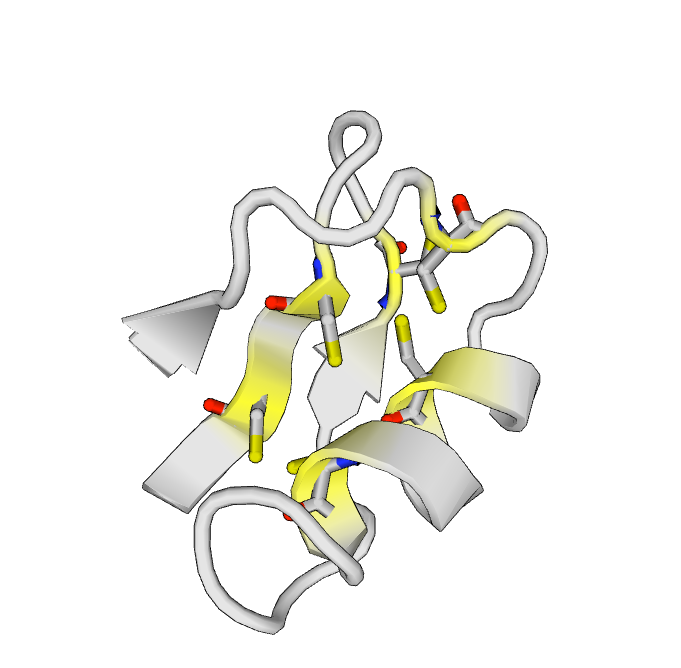
ImKTx88 3D tertiary structure: Length / 38 a.a.; Mass / 4,33 kDa; PubMed / 21194541; Chemspider / None; 3D model (SMR) / P0CJ24; Checksum / F2852DA7169D73C5

ImKTx88 is a selective inhibitor of the K_{v}1 ion channel family that can be isolated from the venom of the Isometrus maculatus (lesser brown scorpion). This peptide belongs to the α-KTx subfamily and is classified as a pore-blocking toxin.

== Etymology ==
The name ImKTx88 is derived from the scorpion species, Isometrus maculatus, its target, K channels, the abbreviation of toxin, Tx, and the clone number in the cDNA library, 88.

== Sources ==
ImKTx88 is a peptide that can be isolated from the venom produced by the glands of Isometrus maculatus (lesser brown scorpion).

== Chemistry ==
=== Family and homology ===
ImKTx88 belongs to the α-KTx family. This peptide has not shown a high percentage of sequence similarity with other toxins selective for the same family of K+ channels α-KTx and may be classified in a new group among the related Kv blocker.

=== Structure ===
ImKTx88 complete sequence has a mass of 6,763 kDa and is constituted by 60 amino acids. The mature toxin, which misses the signal peptide of 22 amino acids, has a mass of 4,33 kDa and is constituted by 38 amino acids residues. The peptide folds in three secondary structures: one α-helix at N-terminus, three anti-parallel β-sheets at C-terminus. The α-helix contains acidic residues, whereas β-sheets contain basic ones. Additionally, three disulphide bridges form the tertiary structure. These structures patterns suggest that ImKTx88 may be a potential Kv channel blocker for its similarity with Kv channel blocker family. Although, its amino acid sequence is not very similar, the predicted folded protein was reasonably similar to most Kv channel blockers. The typical aromatic ring with a lysine, found for alpha-KTX-family is present.

Amino acid sequence: MSNFSVFLIA LLFCSVFILS EAQIYTSKEC NGSSECYSHC EGITGKRSGK CINKKCYCYR

== Target ==
ImKTx88 binds at the pore of the potassium channels Kv1.1, Kv1.2 and Kv1.3. The basic residues on the anti-parallel β-sheets are implicated in this interaction. The toxin has a higher affinity for Kv1.3 than for Kv1.1 and Kv1.2, with an IC50 of 91 pM, 389 nM and 8,47 μM respectively.

== Mode of action ==
ImKTx88 is classified as a pore-blocking toxin. ImKTx88 blocks Kv1.3 channels, which are present in dendritic cells, lymphocytes, mitral cells and are also localized in the nucleus of several types of cells in cancer and in brain tissue. Kv1.3 channels regulate the resting membrane potential, and the toxin might thus disrupt membrane repolarization and calcium signalling.

== Toxicity ==
Isometrus maculatus has been classified as mildly venomous species. Its sting displays a variety of neurotoxic symptoms like numbness and paraesthesia. The neurotoxic features may be related to the modulation of ion channels by the toxin.

== Therapeutic use ==
ImKTx88 ameliorate pathological severity in experimental autoimmune encephalomyelitis (EAE) rats by reducing extravasation into central nervous system (CNS) and by stabilizing the blood-brain barrier (BBB). Moreover, this toxin improves the severity of loss or redistribution of tight junction proteins, and inhibits over-expression of ICAM-1 and VCAM-1 in the brain from EAE rats. ImKTx88 is being investigated as a novel therapeutic agent for multiple sclerosis (MS) treatment. In macrophages, knock-down experiments of kcna3 (gene of Kv1.3) impaired cell growth and migration, features characteristic of cancer development
