= Isometrus thurstoni =

Scientific classification
- Domain: Eukaryota
- Kingdom: Animalia
- Phylum: Arthropoda
- Subphylum: Chelicerata
- Class: Arachnida
- Order: Scorpiones
- Family: Buthidae
- Genus: Isometrus
- Species: I. thurstoni

Binomial name
- Isometrus thurstoni (Pocock, 1893)

Species of arachnid (scopion)

Isometrus thurstoni is a species of scorpion in the family Buthidae. The newly discovered Isometrus species, Isometrus kovariki, from the Western Ghats region of India, is closely related.
