= Reddyanus petrzelkai =

Scientific classification
- Kingdom: Animalia
- Phylum: Arthropoda
- Subphylum: Chelicerata
- Class: Arachnida
- Order: Scorpiones
- Family: Buthidae
- Genus: Reddyanus
- Species: R. petrzelkai

Binomial name
- Reddyanus petrzelkai (Kovařík, 2003)

Synonyms
- Isometrus petrzelkai Raddyanus petrzelkai

Species of scorpion

Reddyanus petrzelkai is a species of scorpion in the family Buthidae and the genus Reddyanus.

== Description ==
R. petrzelkai is a small to moderately sized scorpion about 47 mm in length characterized by a blackened, patterned coloration over its carapace and tergites. A distinct feature of the species is its large rounded subaculear teeth, and its numerous smaller pectinal teeth.

R. petrzelkai is sexually dimorphic, with males having a longer total body length in addition to longer metasomal segments and an enlarged telson. Coloration is also partially determined by sex; females have a distinct spotted yellow pattern on their metasoma and a noticeably darker fifth segment in comparison to their the rest of their body. Males have a reddish color on their telson not present in females.

The scorpion is comparable to the related species Reddyanus hainanensis, though that species is distinguished by its paler body and smoother claw. Another related species comparable to R. petrzelkai is Reddyanus deharvengi; which is significantly larger and paler than R. petrzelkai. In addition to these similar species, R. petrzelkai has been historically misidentified as Reddyanus vittatus.

R. hainanensis and Reddyanus laos are regarded as particularly similar to R. petrzelkai; and were previously synonymous.

== Distribution ==
Similar to the rest of the Reddyanus, R. petrzelkai is native to eastern Asia; and is particularly common in southern China and Vietnam. Specimens of the species have been occasionally found in Thailand and Cambodia.

== Behavior ==
R. petrzelkai is considered a probable troglophile, a rare trait among scorpion lifestyles.

== Taxonomy ==
R. petrzelkai was first described by František Kovařík. Some of Kovařík's original specimens had previously been misidentified as R. vittatus, and the species was taxonomically separated in 2003.

Taxonomic classification of the species has proved unstable. In 2013, an assessment argued that based on the extreme similarities between the species R. hainanensis and R. laos were to be synonymized with R. petrzelkai. This synonymization was later retracted, and the species were separated again upon further research. The current classification has remained since then, but this definition is not unambiguously acceptance.

As with the rest of the species in its genus, R. petrzelkai was previously considered to belong to the Isometrus genus.
