= Reddyanus ceylonensis =

Scientific classification
- Kingdom: Animalia
- Phylum: Arthropoda
- Subphylum: Chelicerata
- Class: Arachnida
- Order: Scorpiones
- Family: Buthidae
- Genus: Reddyanus
- Species: R. ceylonensis

Binomial name
- Reddyanus ceylonensis Kovarik, Lowe, Ranawana, Hoferek, Jayarathne & Stahlavsky, 2016

Synonyms
- Isometrus (Reddyanus) besucheti Vachon, 1982

Species of scorpion

Reddyanus ceylonensis is a species of scorpion in the family Buthidae endemic to Sri Lanka.

== Description ==
Much similar to Reddyanus besucheti, but can be separated by having longer and narrower metasoma in males. Total length is about 27 to 39 mm. Male has slightly longer metasomal segments and telson as well as wider pedipalp chela than the female. Body color is yellowish to reddish, with some brown to black spots. Chelicera strongly reticulated with spotted fingers. Ventrum mesosoma and pedipalps are yellowish brown with a pair of black spots on seventh sternite. Carapace and pedipalps are yellowish to reddish in color dorsally and laterally with brown to black spots. Legs, femur, patella and manus of pedipalps with same coloration. Pedipalp fingers are reddish black. Metasomal segments are yellowish to reddish with the spots. In much older individuals, the fourth and fifth metasomal segments are reddish brown to black in color. Telson reddish brown with spots, which is much darker in older specimens. Carapace without carinae but covered with large granules. Mesosoma with one granulated median carina. Tergite VII is pentacarinate. Seventh sternite is with an incomplete carinae, which is sparsely granulate. Female has 11 to 15 pectinal tooth, whereas male has 14 to 15 pectinal tooth. Telson elongate, with subaculear tooth wide and rounded. Femur and patella only very sparsely hirsute.
