= Psora-4 =

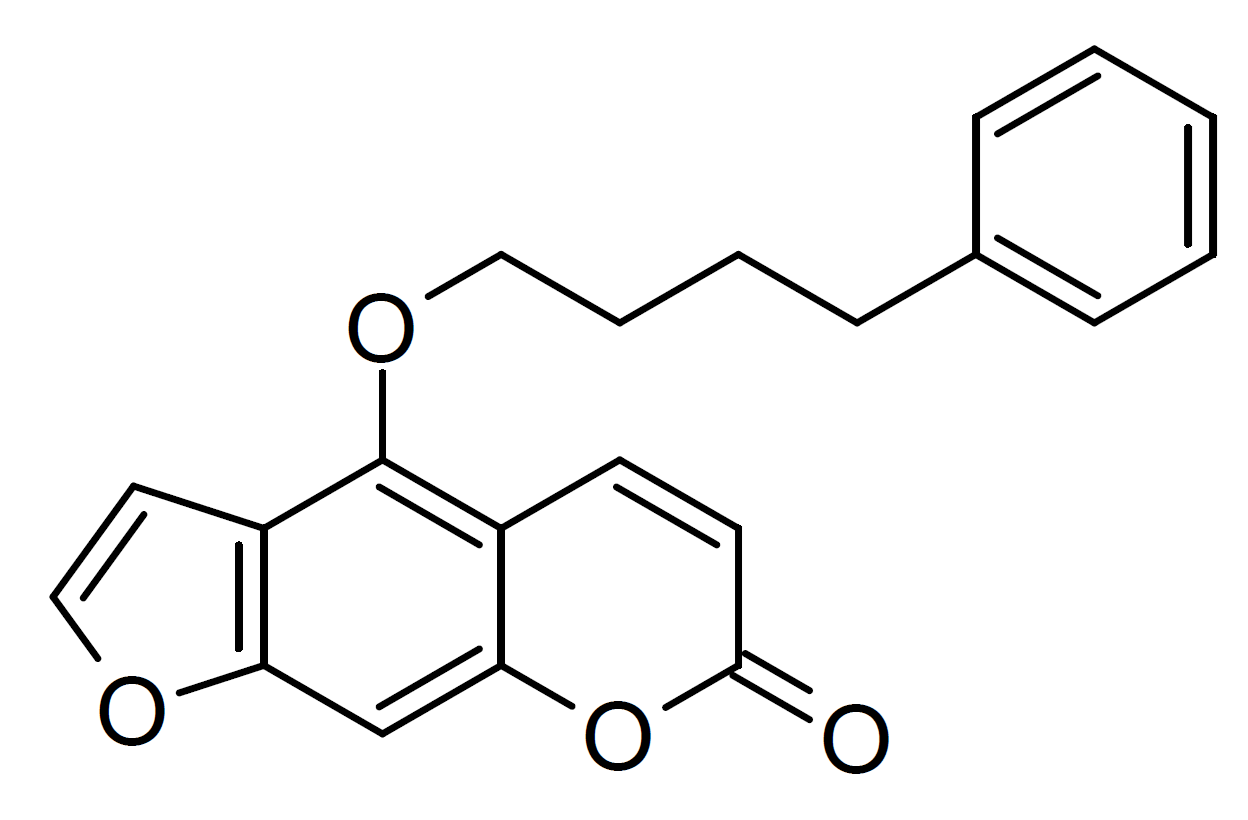

Identifiers
- IUPAC name: 4-(4-phenylbutoxy)furo[3,2-g]chromen-7-one
- CAS Number: 724709-68-6
- PubChem CID: 6603977
- IUPHAR/BPS: 9583
- ChemSpider: 5036283
- UNII: QDY3FLF2DY
- ChEBI: CHEBI:183514
- ChEMBL: ChEMBL1256851
- CompTox Dashboard (EPA): DTXSID10424970

Chemical and physical data
- Formula: C_{21}H_{18}O_{4}
- Molar mass: 334.371 g·mol^{−1}
- 3D model (JSmol): Interactive image
- SMILES: C1=CC=C(C=C1)CCCCOC2=C3C=CC(=O)OC3=CC4=C2C=CO4
- InChI: InChI=1S/C21H18O4/c22-20-10-9-16-19(25-20)14-18-17(11-13-23-18)21(16)24-12-5-4-8-15-6-2-1-3-7-15/h1-3,6-7,9-11,13-14H,4-5,8,12H2; Key:JJAWGNIQEOFURP-UHFFFAOYSA-N

Psora-4 is an experimental drug that acts as a selective inhibitor of the K_{v}1.3 potassium channel. It has immunomodulatory effects, suppressing the proliferation of memory T cells, but increases neural progenitor cell proliferation and has lifespan-extending effects in animal studies.
