= Anuroctoxin =

Anuroctoxin (α-KTx 6.12) is a peptide from the venom of the Mexican scorpion Anuroctonus phaiodactylus. This neurotoxin belongs to the alpha family of potassium channel acting peptides. It is a high-affinity blocker of Kv1.3 channels.

== Sources ==
Anuroctoxin is a peptide which is derived from the scorpion Anuroctonus phaiodactylus; this scorpion belongs to the scorpion family Iuridae.

== Chemistry ==
Scorpion toxins acting on K+ channels (KTx) are grouped in three different families: the α-,β- and γ-scorpion toxins. The Anuroctoxin peptide belongs to the α-KTx group, which are short peptides that block potassium channels, consisting of 30 to 40 amino acids with three or four disulfide bridges. Based on a phylogenetic analysis Anuroctoxin is included in subfamily six in the α-KTx phylogenetic tree; its systematic name is α-KTx 6.12.

== Structure ==
Anuroctoxin has 35 amino acids with four disulfide bridges. Its molecular weight is 4082.8 Da.

== Target ==
Patch-clamp experiments have shown that Anuroctoxin is a potent blocker of Kv1.3 (Kd= 0.73 nM) potassium channels. Besides Kv1.3/KCNA3 channels, Anuroctoxin also significantly inhibits Kv1.2 (Kd = 6 nM) potassium channels. Anuroctoxin does not block any of the following channels: calcium-activated KCa3.1/KCNN4 potassium channels, Shaker IR, Kv1.1/KCNA1, and Kv2.1/KCNB1 potassium channels.

== Mode of action ==
The α-KTx inhibition of the potassium channels is mediated by a simple bimolecular plugging mechanism: the extracellular pore, which has a specific receptor site, is occluded by a single toxin molecule binding to it. Whether this block is voltage dependent, which is common in scorpion toxins remains to be seen. This pore block is however fully reversible, which implies that it is not a potent neurotoxin.
