= Srilankametrus yaleensis =

Scientific classification
- Kingdom: Animalia
- Phylum: Arthropoda
- Subphylum: Chelicerata
- Class: Arachnida
- Order: Scorpiones
- Family: Scorpionidae
- Genus: Srilankametrus
- Species: S. yaleensis

Binomial name
- Srilankametrus yaleensis (Kovarik, Ranawana, Jayarathne, Hoferek & Stahlavsky, 2019)

Synonyms
- Heterometrus yaleensis Kovarik, Ranawana, Jayarathne, Hoferek & Stahlavsky, 2019

Species of scorpion

Srilankametrus yaleensis is a species of scorpion in the family Scorpionidae endemic to Sri Lanka.

== Etymology ==
The species name is named after Yala National Park, the most visited and second largest national park in Sri Lanka. It is the region where both type specimens of the species were recorded.

== Description ==
The total length of males is 75 mm and 103 mm in female.
