= Paralytic (gene) =

Gene

Identifiers
- Symbol: para
- Alt. symbols: bss, sbl, olfD, DmNa_{v}, DmNa_{v}1, DmNav
- NCBI gene: 32619
- UniProt: P35500

Other data
- Locus: Chr. X 16,455,230 - 16,533,368
Search for
- Structures: Swiss-model
- Domains: InterPro

Paralytic is a gene in the fruit fly, Drosophila melanogaster, which encodes a voltage gated sodium channel within D. melanogaster neurons. This gene is essential for locomotive activity in the fly. There are 9 different para alleles, composed of a minimum of 26 exons within over 78kb of genomic DNA. The para gene undergoes alternative splicing to produce subtypes of the channel protein. Flies with mutant forms of paralytic are used in fly models of seizures, since seizures can be easily induced in these flies.

== Gene ==
The para gene is located on the X chromosome within the Drosophila genome. There are 26 para exons, 13 are constitutively expressed in the transcript, while 15 are alternatively spliced. Alternative splicing allows for the formation of 60 unique transcripts and 57 unique polypeptides. The independent splicing of 11 exons allows for the unique cytoplasmic loops, the alternative splicing also can effect the Na^{+} channel kinetics, such as the varying gating conductivities. The mature mRNA transcript only includes one of C or D exonic region and only one of K or L exonic region, as they code for the same or similar regions. Neurons containing para exon L, show an increase in firing frequency which is associated with increase seizure susceptibility. Channel kinetics are influenced by splicing, that not only changes protein structure but can allow for varying modifications, like differential binding of cofactors.

== Known mutant variants ==
Currently there are 117 known allele variants within the para locus, a few are mentioned below.

Mutant	Properties	Mutation	Phenotype
para^{bss1}	gain-of-function	mis-sense substitution in S3 of HD4	leads to seizures
para^{GEFS+}	sustained depolarization in GABA neurons	K→T knock-in at S2 of HD2	temperature susceptibility for seizures
para^{DS}	reduction in Na^{+} current	S→R knock-in at S1 of HD2	temperature susceptibility for seizures
para^{JS}	reduction of transcription	transposon insertion 3' UTR	seizure-suppressor

== Protein ==
This proteins forms a sodium-selective ion channel, that relies on an electrochemical gradient. The protein consists of four homology domains, HD1, HD2, HD3 and HD4. Each homology domain has six alpha helical segments, S1-S6. The small alpha-helical region between S5 and S6 is known as the channel pore. Mutations within this region may be responsible for ion selectivity. The cytoplasmic loop between HD3 and HD4 is responsible for fast inactivation and blocking conductance. The voltage sensor 4 in HD III is partially formed by exon L and K. The alternative splicing at this locus causes a difference in the charged current at this channel. Exon L produces 8% of the transient current, which falls to 2% when the K exon is incorporated.

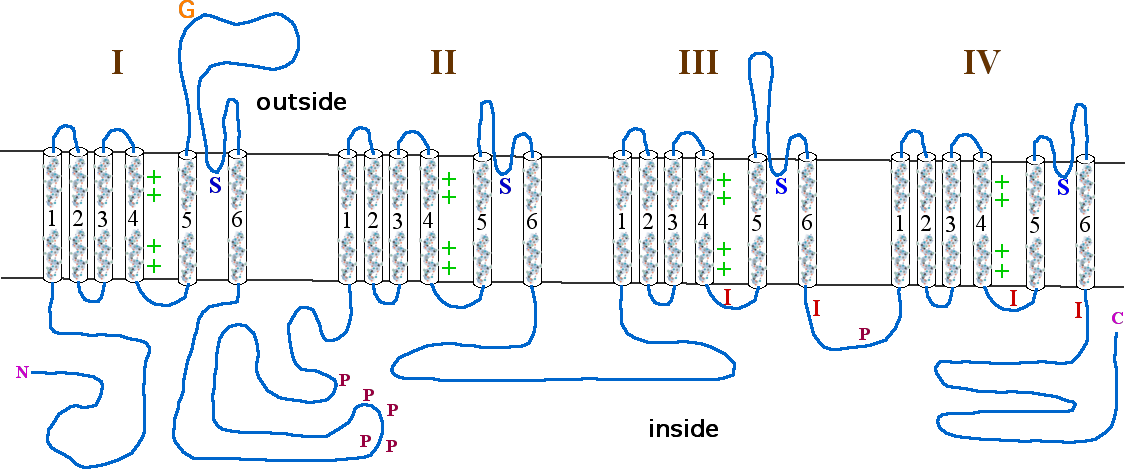
This image depicts the α-subunit of a generic voltage-gated sodium channel and displays the six alpha helical segments (S1-S6) per homology domains (I - IV).

== Function ==
Paralytic encodes a protein channel which transfers sodium ions into neurons and is activated in response to changes in the voltage across a membrane to propagate an action potential. The paralytic protein has been found in the thoracic-abdominal ganglion, eye tissues and cortical regions in the brain.

== Role in seizure models ==
Flies with certain mutations in para gene are used as models for studying seizures and epilepsy, as they are much more prone to seizures than regular flies. Some of these mutant para genotypes are cause either severe sensitivity to seizures, or act as seizure suppressors. In these mutant flies, seizures can be induced by mechanical shock, electrical shock, or high-frequency visual stimuli such as strobe lights.

A number of mutations in paralytic have been described which can cause this increased sensitivity to seizures. Some of these, such as bss^{1} and bss^{2} can be caused by a single point mutation in the paralytic gene which makes the channel less able to inactivate itself after being activated.

Understanding the genetic and environmental influences on the seizures in mutant para flies, has proved to be a trackable system in understanding the complexity in human seizure models.

== Evolution ==
Voltage-gated sodium channels are highly conserved across lineages. The exons in specific, are conserved across many diverged groups of species, this seems to indicate physiological importance. Insect species have only one a single sodium channel gene which encodes the mammalian equivalent of α subunit. Insects like D. melanogaster take advantage of alternative splicing and RNA editing to generate distinct gating properties of sodium channels.

== Human orthologs ==
The most closely related genes to paralytic in humans are SCN1A, SCN8A and SCN2A, all of which are genes that encode sodium channels. Mutations in the human orthologs have been linked to seizure disorders and cognitive defects. Fly models can be used to study branches of human epilepsy, by using GEFS+ mutations at SCN1A gene for knock-in's at the para locus in D. melanogaster.

== See also ==
- Voltage-gated ion channel
- Na_{v}1.2
- SCN8A
- SCN1A
