= Reddyanus bilyi =

Scientific classification
- Kingdom: Animalia
- Phylum: Arthropoda
- Subphylum: Chelicerata
- Class: Arachnida
- Order: Scorpiones
- Family: Buthidae
- Genus: Reddyanus
- Species: R. bilyi

Binomial name
- Reddyanus bilyi (Kovařík, 2003)

Synonyms
- Isometrus bilyi Kovařík, 2003

Species of scorpion

Reddyanus bilyi is a species of scorpion in the family Buthidae. It is endemic to Australia.

== Etymology ==
The epithet bilyi honours Svatopluk Bílý of Prague, who collected the type specimen.

== Description ==
The base colouration of the female holotype is yellow, with numerous black markings. The length is 26.1 mm.

== Distribution ==
The type locality is Kuranda in Far North Queensland.
