= Isometrus thwaitesi =

Scientific classification
- Kingdom: Animalia
- Phylum: Arthropoda
- Subphylum: Chelicerata
- Class: Arachnida
- Order: Scorpiones
- Family: Buthidae
- Genus: Isometrus
- Species: I. thwaitesi

Binomial name
- Isometrus thwaitesi (Pocock, 1897)

Synonyms
- Isometrus (Isometrus) thwaitesi Vachon, 1982; Isometrus (Isometrus) thwaitesi pallidus Lourenço & Huber, 2002

Species of scorpion

Isometrus thwaitesi is a species of scorpion in the family Buthidae endemic to Sri Lanka.

== Description ==
Total length is 30 to 50 mm.
