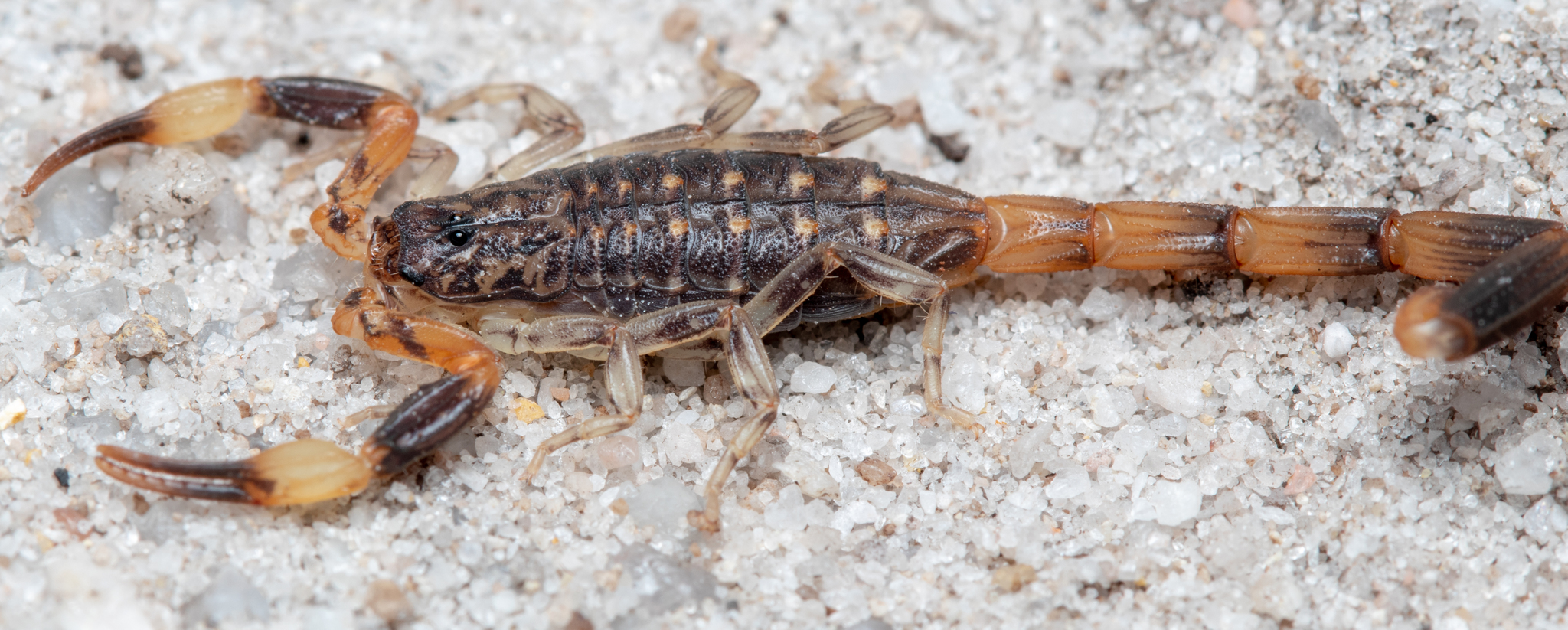

Scientific classification
- Kingdom: Animalia
- Phylum: Arthropoda
- Subphylum: Chelicerata
- Class: Arachnida
- Order: Scorpiones
- Family: Buthidae
- Genus: Reddyanus
- Species: R. melanodactylus

Binomial name
- Reddyanus melanodactylus (L.Koch, 1867)

Synonyms
- Lychas melanodactylus L. Koch, 1867; Isometrus melanodactylus L.Koch, 1867; Isometrus gracilis Thorell, 1877; Isometrus papuensis Werner, 1916; Isometrus melanodactylus inflatus Glauert, 1925

= Reddyanus melanodactylus =

Species of scorpion

Reddyanus melanodactylus is a species of scorpion in the Buthidae family. It is native to Australia, and was first described by German arachnologist Ludwig Carl Christian Koch in 1867.

== Distribution ==
The species is found mainly in eastern Queensland, extending into northern New South Wales at the southern end of its range.
