= Reddyanus assamensis =

Scientific classification
- Domain: Eukaryota
- Kingdom: Animalia
- Phylum: Arthropoda
- Subphylum: Chelicerata
- Class: Arachnida
- Order: Scorpiones
- Family: Buthidae
- Genus: Reddyanus
- Species: R. assamensis

Binomial name
- Reddyanus assamensis (Oates, 1888)

Species of scorpion

Reddyanus assamensis is a species of scorpion in the family Buthidae.
