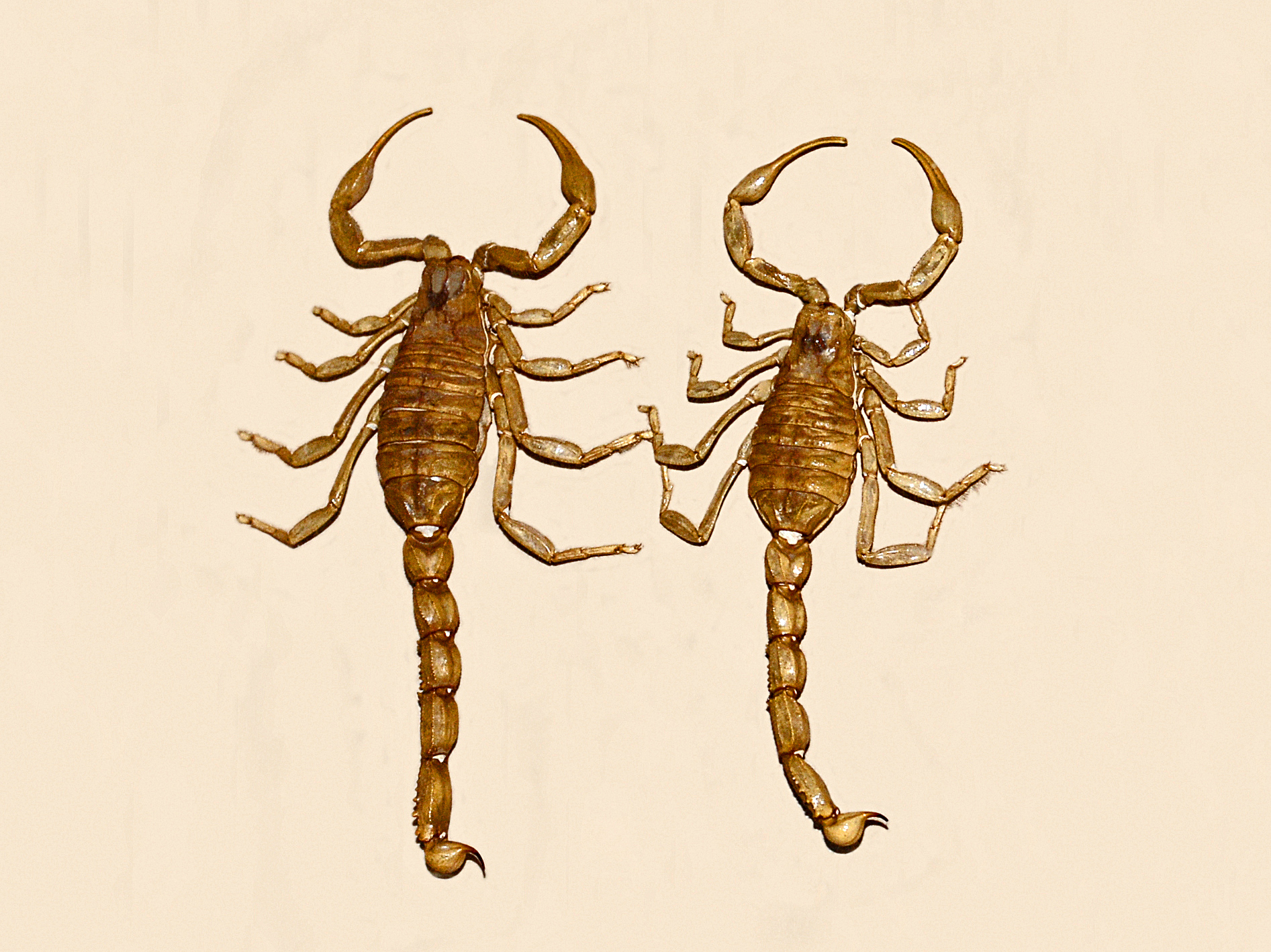
- Odontobuthus doriae from Iran. Museum specimens

Scientific classification
- Domain: Eukaryota
- Kingdom: Animalia
- Phylum: Arthropoda
- Subphylum: Chelicerata
- Class: Arachnida
- Order: Scorpiones
- Family: Buthidae
- Genus: Odontobuthus
- Species: O. doriae

Binomial name
- Odontobuthus doriae (Thorell, 1876)

= Odontobuthus doriae =

Species of scorpion

Odontobuthus doriae, the yellow Iranian scorpion, is a species of scorpions belonging to the family Buthidae.

== Description ==
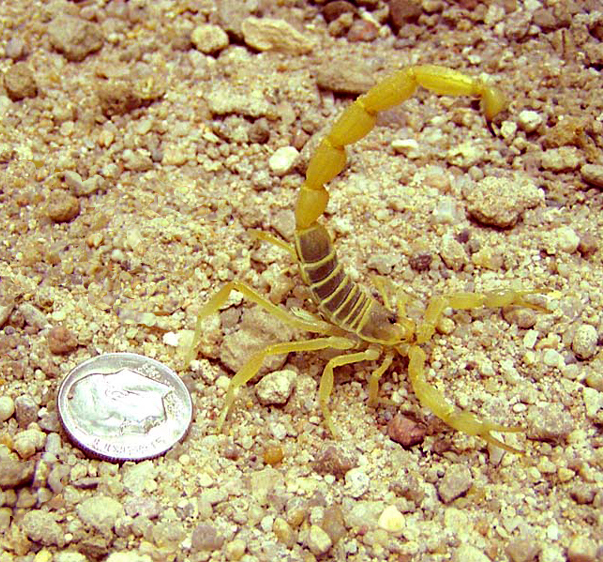
Odontobuthus doriae

Odontobuthus doriae can reach a length of about 65–70 millimetres (2.6–2.8 in). These medium-sized scorpions show a basic coloration ranging from yellow to pale yellow.

== Distribution ==
This species can be found in Iran and Iraq.

== See also ==
- OdK2, a potassium channel blocker present in the venom of Odontobuthus doriae.
