= Reddyanus navaiae =

Scientific classification
- Kingdom: Animalia
- Phylum: Arthropoda
- Subphylum: Chelicerata
- Class: Arachnida
- Order: Scorpiones
- Family: Buthidae
- Genus: Reddyanus
- Species: R. navaiae

Binomial name
- Reddyanus navaiae (Kovařík, 1998)

Species of scorpion

Reddyanus navaiae is a species of scorpion in the family Buthidae.
