= Reddyanus khammamensis =

Scientific classification
- Kingdom: Animalia
- Phylum: Arthropoda
- Subphylum: Chelicerata
- Class: Arachnida
- Order: Scorpiones
- Family: Buthidae
- Genus: Reddyanus
- Species: R. khammamensis

Binomial name
- Reddyanus khammamensis (Kovařík, 2003)

Species of scorpion

Reddyanus khammamensis is a species of scorpion in the family Buthidae.
