= SCN8A =

Protein-coding gene in the species Homo sapiens

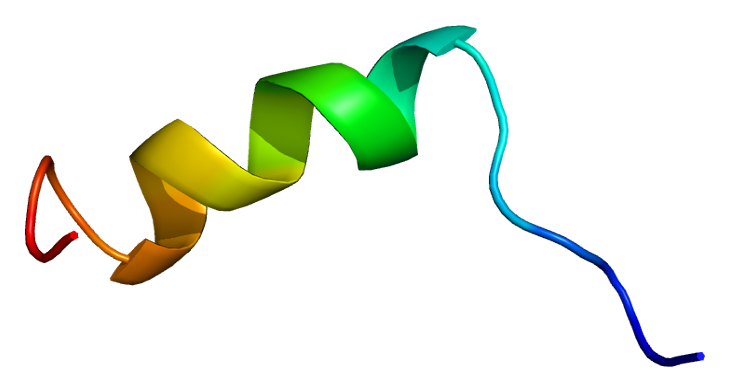

Identifiers
- Aliases: SCN8A, CERIII, CIAT, EIEE13, MED, NaCh6, Nav1.6, PN4, sodium voltage-gated channel alpha subunit 8, BFIS5, MYOCL2, DEE13
- External IDs: OMIM: 600702; MGI: 103169; GeneCards: SCN8A
Available structures
| PDB | Ortholog search: PDBe RCSB |
| PDB | List of PDB id codes 3WFN |

Gene location (Human)
| Chr. | Chromosome 12 (human) |
| Band | 12q13.13 | Start | 51,590,266 bp |
| Band | 12q13.13 | End | 51,812,864 bp |

Gene location (Mouse)
| Chr. | Chromosome 15 (mouse) |
| Band | 15 56.39 cM|15 F1 | Start | 100,767,739 bp |
| Band | 15 56.39 cM|15 F1 | End | 100,943,819 bp |
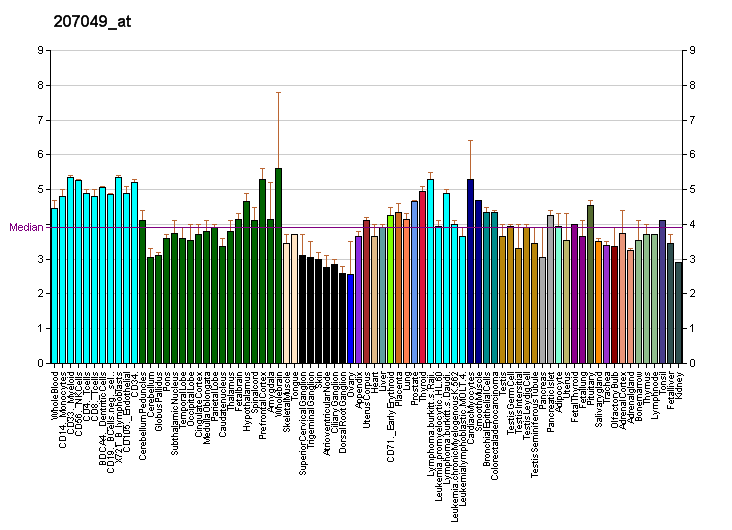
RNA expression pattern
| Bgee | Human / Mouse (ortholog); Top expressed in: Brodmann area 23; middle temporal gyrus; postcentral gyrus; primary visual cortex; superior frontal gyrus; endothelial cell; entorhinal cortex; lateral nuclear group of thalamus; buccal mucosa cell; right hemisphere of cerebellum / Top expressed in: pontine nuclei; subiculum; cerebellar vermis; prefrontal cortex; primary motor cortex; deep cerebellar nuclei; medial dorsal nucleus; medial vestibular nucleus; lobe of cerebellum; lateral geniculate nucleus; More reference expression data |
| BioGPS | More reference expression data |
Gene ontology
| Molecular function | nucleotide binding; sodium channel activity; voltage-gated ion channel activity; ion channel activity; ATP binding; protein binding; voltage-gated sodium channel activity |
| Cellular component | voltage-gated sodium channel complex; integral component of membrane; membrane; node of Ranvier; Z discdkac; axon initial segment; cytoplasmic vesicle; plasma membrane; axon |
| Biological process | membrane depolarization during action potential; peripheral nervous system development; sodium ion transport; regulation of ion transmembrane transport; ion transport; nervous system development; ion transmembrane transport; transmembrane transport; myelination; neuronal action potential; sodium ion transmembrane transport |
Sources:Amigo / QuickGO
Orthologs
| Databases | NCBI: entry; OMA: entry |
| Species | Human | Mouse |
| Entrez | 6334 | 20273 |
| Ensembl | ENSG00000196876 | ENSMUSG00000023033 |
| UniProt | Q9UQD0 | Q9WTU3 |
| RefSeq (mRNA) | NM_001177984; NM_014191; NM_175894; NM_001330260; NM_001369788 | NM_001077499; NM_011323 |
| RefSeq (protein) | NP_001171455; NP_001317189; NP_055006; NP_001356717 | NP_001070967; NP_035453 |
| Location (UCSC) | Chr 12: 51.59 – 51.81 Mb | Chr 15: 100.77 – 100.94 Mb |
| PubMed search |
- Wikidata
| View/Edit Human | View/Edit Mouse |

Sodium channel protein type 8 subunit alpha also known as Na_{v}1.6 is a membrane protein encoded by the SCN8A gene. Na_{v}1.6 is one sodium channel isoform and is the primary voltage-gated sodium channel at each node of Ranvier. The channels are highly concentrated in sensory and motor axons in the peripheral nervous system and cluster at the nodes in the central nervous system.

== Structure ==
Na_{v}1.6 is encoded by the SCN8A gene which contains 27 exons and measures 170 kb. The voltage gated sodium channel is composed of 1980 residues. Like other sodium channels, Na_{v}1.6 is a monomer composed of four homologous domains (I-IV) and 25 transmembrane segments. SCN8A encodes S3-S4 transmembrane segments which form an intracellular loop.

== Function ==
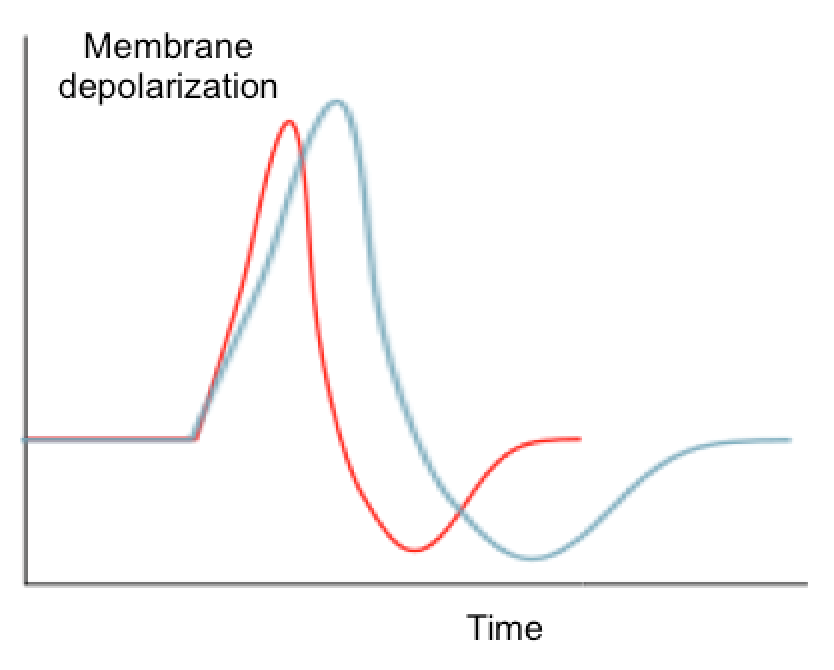
Na_{v}1.6 action potentials, shown in blue, demonstrate greater depolarization, higher frequency and longer firing time before depolarization compared to action potentials observed in other sodium channel isoforms, shown in red.

Like other sodium ion channels, Na_{v}1.6 facilitates action potential propagation when the membrane potential is depolarized by an influx of Na^{+} ions. However, Na_{v}1.6 is able to sustain repetitive excitation and firing. The high frequency firing characteristic of Na_{v}1.6 is caused by a persistent and resurgent sodium current. This characteristic is caused by slow activation of the sodium channel following repolarization, which allows a steady-state sodium current after the initial action potential propagation. The steady-state sodium current contributes to the depolarization of the following action potential. Additionally, the activation threshold of Na_{v}1.6 is lower compared to other common sodium channels such as Na_{v}1.2. This feature allows Na_{v}1.6 channels to rapidly recover from inactivation and sustain a high rate of activity.

Na_{v}1.6 is expressed primarily in the nodes of Ranvier in myelinated axons but is also highly concentrated at the distal end of the axon hillock, cerebellar granule cells and Purkinje neurons and to a lower extent in non-myelinated axons and dendrites. Given the location of Na_{v}1.6, the channel contributes to the firing threshold of a given neuron, as the electrical impulses from various inputs are summed at the axon hillock in order to reach firing threshold before propagating down the axon. Other sodium channel isoforms are expressed at the distal end of the axon hillock, including Na_{v}1.1 and Na_{v}1.2.

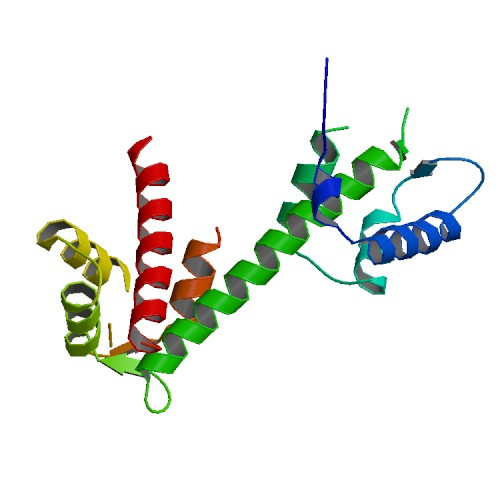
Nav1.6 IQ motif in complex with CaM

Na_{V}1.6 channels demonstrate resistance against protein phosphorylation regulation. Sodium channels are modulated by protein kinase A and protein kinase C (PKC) phosphorylation, which reduce peak sodium currents. Dopamine and acetylcholine decrease sodium currents in hippocampal pyramidal neurons through phosphorylation. Similarly, serotonin receptors in the prefrontal cortex are regulated by PKC in order to reduce sodium currents. Phosphorylated regulation in sodium channels helps to slow inactivation. However, Na_{V}1.6 channels lacks adequate protein kinase sites. Phosphorylation sites at amino acid residues Ser573 and Ser687 are found in other sodium channels but are not well conserved in Na_{V}1.6. The lack of serine residues lead to the channel's ability to consistently and quickly fire following inactivation.

Na_{V}1.6 is conversely regulated by Calmodulin (CaM). CaM interacts with the isoleucine-glutamine (IQ) motif of Na_{V}1.6 in order to inactivate the channel. The IQ motif folds into a helix when interacting with CaM and CaM will inactivate Na_{V}1.6 depending on the concentration of calcium. The Na_{V}1.6 IQ demonstrates moderate affinity for CaM compared to other sodium channel isoforms such as Na_{V}1.6. The difference in CaM affinity contributes to Na_{V}1.6's resistance to inactivation.

== Clinical significance ==
The first known mutation in humans was discovered by Krishna Veeramah and Michael Hammer in 2012. The genome of a child demonstrating epileptic encephalopathy was sequenced and revealed a de novo missense mutation, p.Asn1768Asp. The missense mutations in Na_{v}1.6 increased channel function by increasing the duration of the persistent sodium current and prevented complete inactivation following hyperpolarization. 20% of the initial current persisted 100 ms after hyperpolarization resulting in hyperexcitability of the neuron and increasing the likelihood of premature or unintentional firing. In addition to epileptic encephalopathy, the patient presented with developmental delay, autistic features, intellectual disability and ataxia.

Sodium channel conversion has been implicated in the demyelination of axons related to multiple sclerosis (MS). In early stages of myelination, immature Na_{v}1.2 channels outnumber Na_{v}1.6 in axons. However, mature Na_{v}1.6 channels gradually replace the other channels as myelination continues, allowing increased conduction velocity given the lower threshold of Na_{v}1.6. However, in MS models, sodium channel conversion from mature Na_{v}1.6 to Na_{v}1.2 is observed.

== See also ==
- Sodium channel
- paralytic - SCN8A ortholog in Drosophila
