= Reddyanus ranawanai =

Scientific classification
- Kingdom: Animalia
- Phylum: Arthropoda
- Subphylum: Chelicerata
- Class: Arachnida
- Order: Scorpiones
- Family: Buthidae
- Genus: Reddyanus
- Species: R. ranawanai

Binomial name
- Reddyanus ranawanai Kovarik, 2016

Synonyms
- Isometrus (Reddyanus) basilicus Kovařík, 2003

Species of scorpion

Reddyanus ranawanai is a species of scorpion in the family Buthidae endemic to Sri Lanka.

== Etymology ==
The species name is given after Prof. Kithsiri B. Ranawana, a leading zoologist in Sri Lanka, who engaged in several biodiversity researches throughout the country.

== Description ==
The total length is about 35 to 43 mm.
