= Srilankametrus gravimanus =

Scientific classification
- Kingdom: Animalia
- Phylum: Arthropoda
- Subphylum: Chelicerata
- Class: Arachnida
- Order: Scorpiones
- Family: Scorpionidae
- Genus: Srilankametrus
- Species: S. gravimanus

Binomial name
- Srilankametrus gravimanus (Pocock, 1894)

Synonyms
- Scorpio gravimanus Pocock, 1894; Undue Heterometrus laevitensus Couzijn 1981; Heterometrus (Srilankametrus) gravimanus Tikader & Bastawade, 1983

Species of scorpion

Srilankametrus gravimanus is a species of scorpion belonging to the family Scorpionidae. It is native to India and Sri Lanka.

== Description ==
The species has a total length of about 75 to 110 mm.

During the hemolytic and enzymic investigations of the crude venom, both direct and indirect (phospholipase A) hemolysins were identified from the species.
