= Reddyanus heimi =

Scientific classification
- Kingdom: Animalia
- Phylum: Arthropoda
- Subphylum: Chelicerata
- Class: Arachnida
- Order: Scorpiones
- Family: Buthidae
- Genus: Reddyanus
- Species: R. heimi

Binomial name
- Reddyanus heimi (Vachon, 1976)

Species of scorpion

Reddyanus heimi is a species of scorpion in the family Buthidae.
