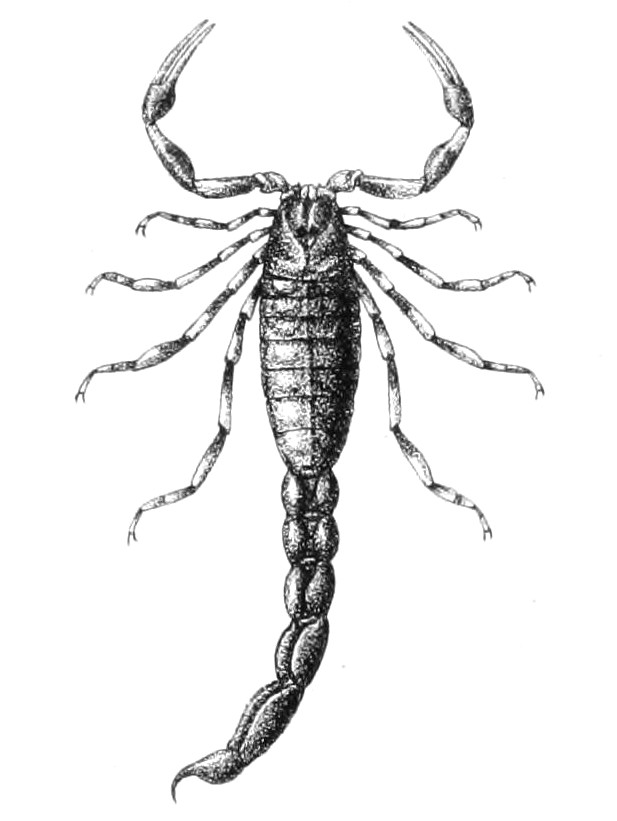

Scientific classification
- Kingdom: Animalia
- Phylum: Arthropoda
- Subphylum: Chelicerata
- Class: Arachnida
- Order: Scorpiones
- Family: Buthidae
- Genus: Charmus
- Species: C. laneaus

Binomial name
- Charmus laneaus (Karsch, 1879)

Synonyms
- Heterocharmus cinctipes Pocock, 1892; Charmus minor Lourenço, 2002

= Charmus laneaus =

Species of scorpion

Charmus laneaus is a species of non-venomous scorpion in the family Buthidae endemic to Sri Lanka.

== Description ==
Total body length of male is 14 mm and female is 21.3 mm.
