= Reddyanus jayarathnei =

Scientific classification
- Kingdom: Animalia
- Phylum: Arthropoda
- Subphylum: Chelicerata
- Class: Arachnida
- Order: Scorpiones
- Family: Buthidae
- Genus: Reddyanus
- Species: R. jayarathnei

Binomial name
- Reddyanus jayarathnei Kovarik, 2016

Species of scorpion

Reddyanus jayarathnei is a species of scorpion in the family Buthidae endemic to Sri Lanka.

== Etymology ==
The species name is named after V. A. Sanjeewa Jayarathne, the collector of the type specimen.

== Description ==
Total length is about 37.1 mm in females and 45.5 mm in males.
