= Charmus saradieli =

Scientific classification
- Kingdom: Animalia
- Phylum: Arthropoda
- Subphylum: Chelicerata
- Class: Arachnida
- Order: Scorpiones
- Family: Buthidae
- Genus: Charmus
- Species: C. saradieli

Binomial name
- Charmus saradieli Kovarik, Lowe, Ranawana, Hoferek & Jayarathne, 2016

Synonyms
- Charmus laneus Vachon, 1982 (misidentification)

Species of scorpion

Charmus saradieli is a species of non-venomous scorpion in the family Buthidae endemic to Sri Lanka.

== Etymology ==
The species name is honored to Deekirikevage Saradiel from Utuwankanda, who is often known as the "Sri Lankan Robin Hood". He engaged several armed rebels against British Colonial rule in Colombo and Kandy in the 1850s–1860s.

== Description ==
The total body length of males is 12.18 mm and females is 23.5 mm. The mesosoma, carapace, metasoma and telson of the male is black. Eyes are surrounded by black pigment. The mesosoma and carapace are yellow in color with black pigments to entirely black. The pedipalp femur and patella are entirely black with small yellow spots. The telson is yellow to reddish black and the legs yellow with black spots. The chelicerae are yellow, with black reticulation. The carapace is granular without carinae. Tergites I to VI are granular, with one clearly visible carina. Sternites are without carinae. Metasomal segments IV and V are punctate without a developed carinae. The pectines are with or without fulcra. Movable and fixed finger of pedipalps are long. There are 12 to 17 pectinal teeth in males, whereas females have 16 pectinal teeth. The telson vesicle is punctate, which is elongate in males.
