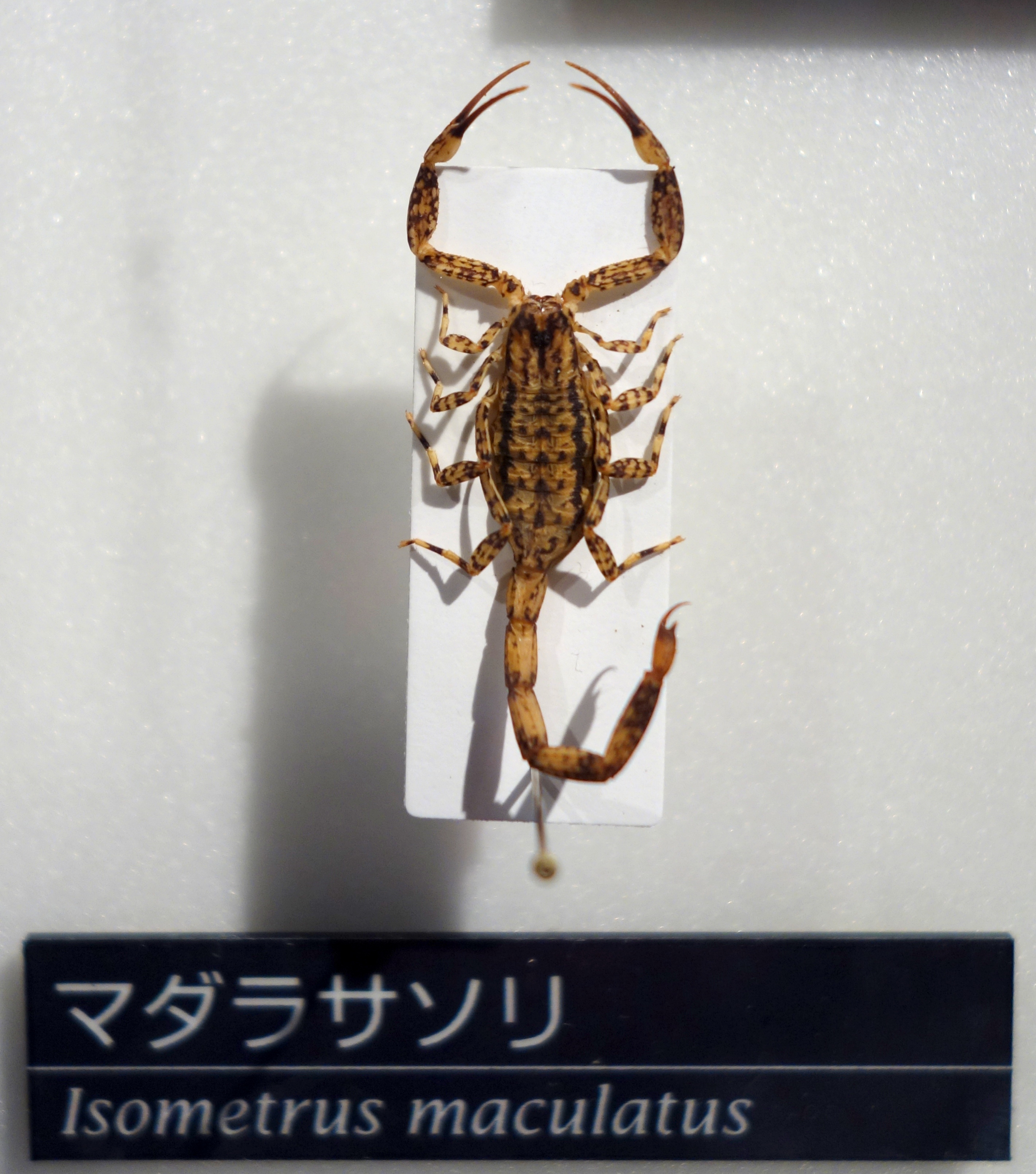

Scientific classification
- Domain: Eukaryota
- Kingdom: Animalia
- Phylum: Arthropoda
- Subphylum: Chelicerata
- Class: Arachnida
- Order: Scorpiones
- Family: Buthidae
- Genus: Isometrus
- Species: I. maculatus

Binomial name
- Isometrus maculatus (De Geer, 1778)

Synonyms
- Scorpio maculatus De Geer, 1778; Isometrus maculatus Kraepelin, 1899; Isometrus (Isometrus) maculatus Vachon, 1972

= Isometrus maculatus =

Lesser brown scorpion

Species of scorpion

Isometrus maculatus, commonly as the lesser brown scorpion, is a species of scorpion in the family Buthidae. Its distribution is pantropical; it is an introduced species in Hawaii.

== Description ==
Total length is about 30 to 75 mm.

The venom of Isometrus maculatus contains the toxins ImKTX58 and ImKTx88.

== See also ==
- Dwarf Wood Scorpion
