= Heterometrus serratus =

Scientific classification
- Kingdom: Animalia
- Phylum: Arthropoda
- Subphylum: Chelicerata
- Class: Arachnida
- Order: Scorpiones
- Family: Scorpionidae
- Genus: Heterometrus
- Species: H. serratus

Binomial name
- Heterometrus serratus (Pocock, 1900)

Synonyms
- Palamnaeus serratus Pocock, 1900; Heterometrus serratus Takashima, 1945; Heterometrus (Srilankametrus) serratus Tikader & Bastawade, 1983; Heterometrus indus indus (in part) Couzijn, 1981; Heterometrus indus (in part) Kovařík, 2004

Species of scorpion

Heterometrus serratus is a species of scorpion in the family Buthidae endemic to Sri Lanka where it is restricted to southern parts.

== Description ==
This species has a total length of about 100 to 130 mm long.
