= Reddyanus loebli =

Scientific classification
- Kingdom: Animalia
- Phylum: Arthropoda
- Subphylum: Chelicerata
- Class: Arachnida
- Order: Scorpiones
- Family: Buthidae
- Genus: Reddyanus
- Species: R. loebli

Binomial name
- Reddyanus loebli (Vachon, 1982)

Synonyms
- Isometrus (Reddyanus) acanthurus loebli Vachon, 1982; Isometrus (Reddyanus) loebli Lourenço & Huber, 2002; Isometrus (Reddyanus) garyi Lourenço & Huber, 2002

Species of scorpion

Reddyanus loebli is a species of scorpion in the family Buthidae.

== Description ==
Total length 26–45 mm.
