= Reddyanus vittatus =

Scientific classification
- Domain: Eukaryota
- Kingdom: Animalia
- Phylum: Arthropoda
- Subphylum: Chelicerata
- Class: Arachnida
- Order: Scorpiones
- Family: Buthidae
- Genus: Reddyanus
- Species: R. vittatus

Binomial name
- Reddyanus vittatus (Pocock, 1897)

Species of scorpion

Reddyanus vittatus is a species of scorpion in the family Buthidae.
