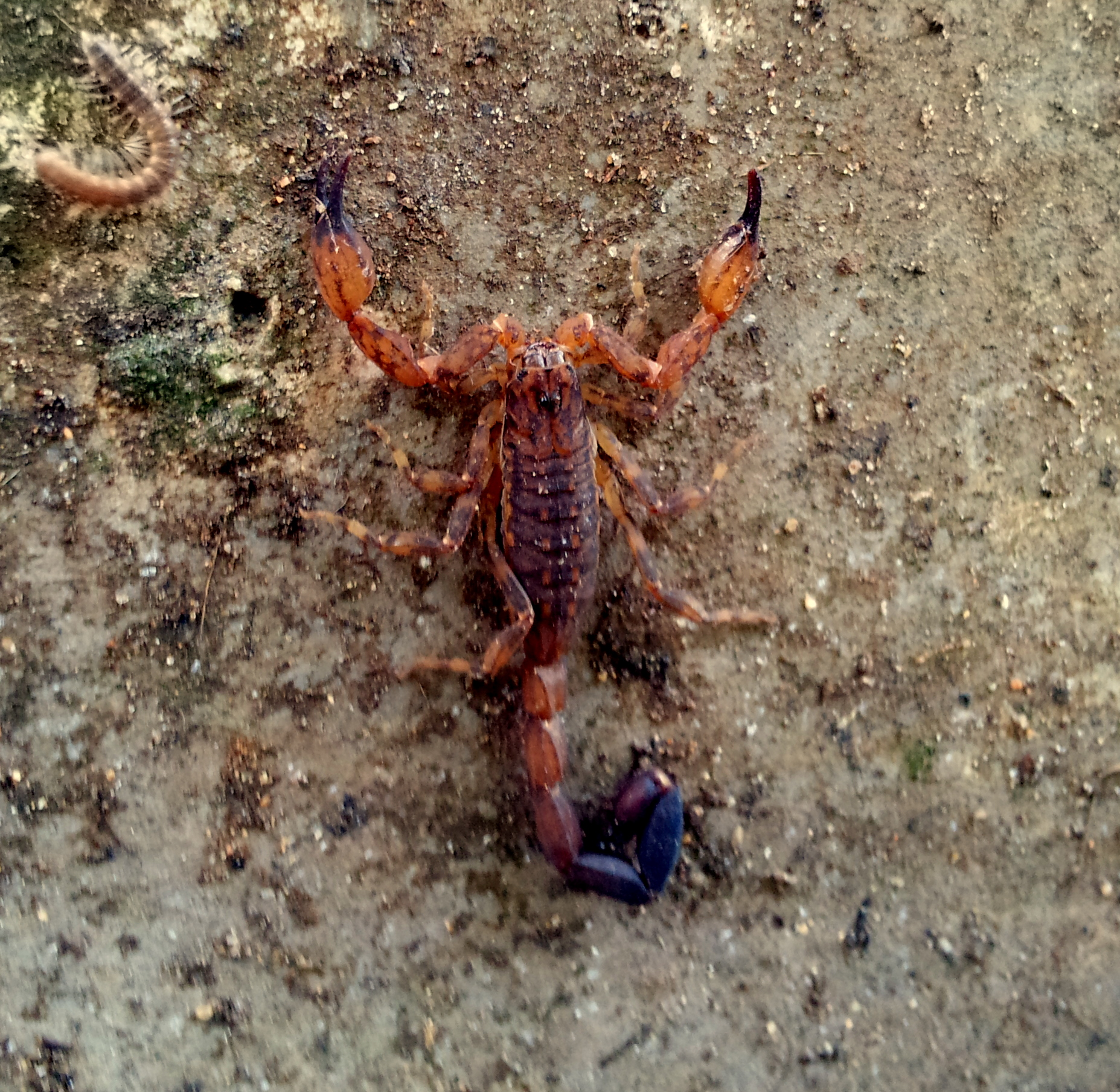

Scientific classification
- Kingdom: Animalia
- Phylum: Arthropoda
- Subphylum: Chelicerata
- Class: Arachnida
- Order: Scorpiones
- Family: Buthidae
- Genus: Reddyanus
- Species: R. besucheti

Binomial name
- Reddyanus besucheti (Vachon, 1982)

Synonyms
- Isometrus (Reddyanus) besucheti Vachon, 1982

= Reddyanus besucheti =

Species of scorpion

Reddyanus besucheti is a species of scorpion in the family Buthidae endemic to Sri Lanka.

== Description ==
Total length is 30 to 45 mm. Identification of immature males and females is difficult, but can be separated by observing pectines, which are longer and larger in males than females.
