= Reddyanus basilicus =

Scientific classification
- Kingdom: Animalia
- Phylum: Arthropoda
- Subphylum: Chelicerata
- Class: Arachnida
- Order: Scorpiones
- Family: Buthidae
- Genus: Reddyanus
- Species: R. basilicus

Binomial name
- Reddyanus basilicus (Karsch, 1879)

Synonyms
- Isometrus basilicus Karsch, 1879; Isometrus (Reddyanus) basilicus Vachon, 1982

Species of scorpion

Reddyanus basilicus is a species of scorpion in the family Buthidae.
