= KCNA3 =

Protein found in humans

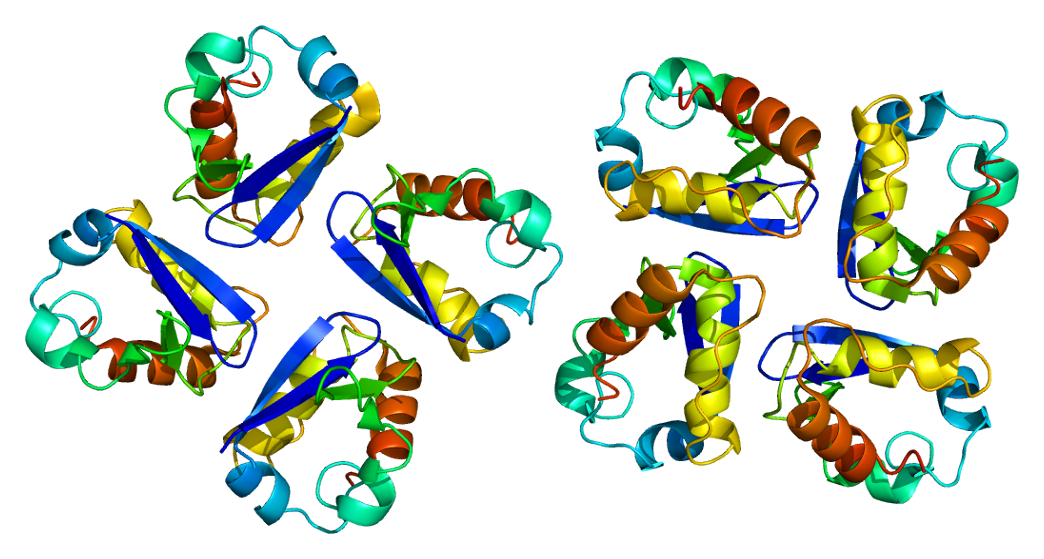

Identifiers
- Aliases: KCNA3, HGK5, HLK3, HPCN3, HUKIII, KV1.3, MK3, PCN3, potassium voltage-gated channel subfamily A member 3
- External IDs: OMIM: 176263; MGI: 96660; GeneCards: KCNA3
Available structures
PDB	Ortholog search: PDBe RCSB
PDB	List of PDB id codes 4BGC

Gene location (Human)
Chr.	Chromosome 1 (human)
Band	1p13.3	Start	110,672,465 bp
Band	1p13.3	End	110,674,940 bp

Gene location (Mouse)
Chr.	Chromosome 3 (mouse)
Band	3 F2.3|3 46.59 cM	Start	106,943,485 bp
Band	3 F2.3|3 46.59 cM	End	106,945,386 bp
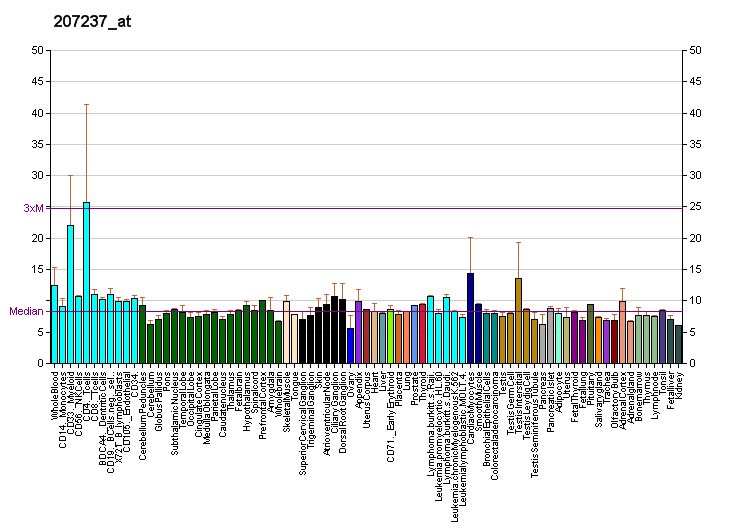
RNA expression pattern
Bgee	Human / Mouse (ortholog); Top expressed in: testicle; bone marrow cell; ventricular zone; lymph node; granulocyte; monocyte; blood; appendix; ganglionic eminence; epithelium of colon / Top expressed in: thymus; ventricular zone; ganglionic eminence; embryo; embryo; central gray substance of midbrain; superior frontal gyrus; primary visual cortex; dentate gyrus of hippocampal formation granule cell; lumbar subsegment of spinal cord; More reference expression data
BioGPS	More reference expression data
Gene ontology
Molecular function	outward rectifier potassium channel activity; potassium channel activity; voltage-gated ion channel activity; ion channel activity; voltage-gated potassium channel activity; delayed rectifier potassium channel activity; protein binding
Cellular component	membrane; voltage-gated potassium channel complex; plasma membrane; integral component of plasma membrane; axon; membrane raft; integral component of membrane; calyx of Held; glutamatergic synapse; integral component of postsynaptic membrane; integral component of presynaptic membrane
Biological process	regulation of ion transmembrane transport; ion transport; potassium ion transport; transmembrane transport; protein homooligomerization; potassium ion transmembrane transport; potassium ion export across plasma membrane
Sources:Amigo / QuickGO
Orthologs
Databases	NCBI: entry; OMA: entry
Species	Human	Mouse
Entrez	3738	16491
Ensembl	ENSG00000177272	ENSMUSG00000047959
UniProt	P22001	P16390
RefSeq (mRNA)	NM_002232	NM_008418
RefSeq (protein)	NP_002223	NP_032444
Location (UCSC)	Chr 1: 110.67 – 110.67 Mb	Chr 3: 106.94 – 106.95 Mb
PubMed search
- Wikidata
View/Edit Human	View/Edit Mouse

Potassium voltage-gated channel, shaker-related subfamily, member 3, also known as KCNA3 or K_{v}1.3, is a protein that in humans is encoded by the KCNA3 gene.

Potassium channels represent the most complex class of voltage-gated ion channels from both functional and structural standpoints. Their diverse functions include regulating neurotransmitter release, heart rate, insulin secretion, neuronal excitability, epithelial electrolyte transport, smooth muscle contraction, and cell volume. Four sequence-related potassium channel genes – shaker, shaw, shab, and shal – have been identified in Drosophila, and each has been shown to have human homolog(s).

This gene encodes a member of the potassium channel, voltage-gated, shaker-related subfamily. This member contains six membrane-spanning domains with a shaker-type repeat in the fourth segment. It belongs to the delayed rectifier class, members of which allow nerve cells to efficiently repolarize following an action potential. It plays an essential role in T cell proliferation and activation. This gene appears to be intronless and is clustered together with KCNA2 and KCNA10 genes on chromosome 1.

== Function ==
KCNA3 encodes the voltage-gated K_{v}1.3 channel, which is expressed in T and B lymphocytes. All human T cells express roughly 300 K_{v}1.3 channels per cell along with 10-20 calcium-activated K_{Ca}3.1 channels. Upon activation, naive and central memory T cells increase expression of the K_{Ca}3.1 channel to approximately 500 channels per cell, while effector-memory T cells increase expression of the K_{v}1.3 channel. Among human B cells, naive and early memory B cells express small numbers of K_{v}1.3 and K_{Ca}3.1 channels when they are quiescent, and augment K_{Ca}3.1 expression after activation. In contrast, class-switched memory B cells express high numbers of K_{v}1.3 channels per cell (about 1500/cell) and this number increases after activation.

K_{v}1.3 is physically coupled through a series of adaptor proteins to the T-cell receptor signaling complex and it traffics to the immunological synapse during antigen presentation. However, blockade of the channel does not prevent immune synapse formation. K_{v}1.3 and K_{Ca}3.1 regulate membrane potential and calcium signaling of T cells. Calcium entry through the CRAC channel is promoted by potassium efflux through the K_{v}1.3 and K_{Ca}3.1 potassium channels.

Blockade of K_{v}1.3 channels in effector-memory T cells suppresses calcium signaling, cytokine production (interferon-gamma, interleukin 2) and cell proliferation. In vivo, K_{v}1.3 blockers paralyze effector-memory T cells at the sites of inflammation and prevent their reactivation in inflamed tissues. In contrast, K_{v}1.3 blockers do not affect the homing to and motility within lymph nodes of naive and central memory T cells, most likely because these cells express the K_{Ca}3.1 channel and are, therefore, protected from the effect of K_{v}1.3 blockade.

K_{v}1.3 has been reported to be expressed in the inner mitochondrial membrane in lymphocytes. The apoptotic protein Bax has been suggested to insert into the outer mitochondrial membrane and occlude the pore of K_{v}1.3 via a lysine residue. Thus, K_{v}1.3 modulation may be one of many mechanisms that contribute to apoptosis.

== Clinical significance ==
=== Autoimmune ===
In patients with multiple sclerosis (MS), disease-associated myelin-specific T cells from the blood are predominantly co-stimulation-independent effector-memory T cells that express high numbers of K_{v}1.3 channels. T cells in MS lesions in postmortem brain lesions are also predominantly effector-memory T cells that express high levels of the K_{v}1.3 channel. In children with type-1 diabetes mellitus, the disease-associated insulin- and GAD65-specific T cells isolated from the blood are effector-memory T cells that express high numbers of K_{v}1.3 channels, and the same is true of T cells from the synovial joint fluid of patients with rheumatoid arthritis. T cells with other antigen specificities in these patients were naive or central memory T cells that upregulate the K_{Ca}3.1 channel upon activation. Consequently, it should be possible to selectively suppress effector-memory T cells with a K_{v}1.3-specific blocker and thereby ameliorate many autoimmune diseases without compromising the protective immune response. In proof-of-concept studies, K_{v}1.3 blockers have prevented and treated disease in rat models of multiple sclerosis, type-1 diabetes mellitus, rheumatoid arthritis, contact dermatitis, and delayed-type hypersensitivity.

At therapeutic concentrations, the blockers did not cause any clinically evident toxicity in rodents, and it did not compromise the protective immune response to acute influenza viral infection and acute chlamydia bacterial infection. Many groups are developing K_{v}1.3 blockers for the treatment of autoimmune diseases.

=== Metabolic ===
K_{v}1.3 is also considered a therapeutic target for the treatment of obesity, for enhancing peripheral insulin sensitivity in patients with type-2 diabetes mellitus, and for preventing bone resorption in periodontal disease. A genetic variation in the K_{v}1.3 promoter region is associated with low insulin sensitivity and impaired glucose tolerance.

=== Neurodegeneration ===
K_{v}1.3 channels have been found to be highly expressed by activated and plaque-associated microglia in human Alzheimer's disease (AD) post-mortem brains as well as in mouse models of AD pathology. Patch-clamp recordings and flow cytometric studies performed on acutely isolated mouse microglia have confirmed upregulation of K_{v}1.3 channels with disease progression in mouse AD models. The K_{v}1.3 channel gene has also been found to be a regulator of pro-inflammatory microglial responses. Selective blockade of K_{v}1.3 channels by the small molecule Pap1 as well as a peptide sea anemone toxin-based peptide ShK-223 have been found to limit amyloid beta plaque burden in mouse AD models, potentially via augmented clearance by microglia.

== Blockers ==
K_{v}1.3 is blocked by several peptides from venomous creatures including scorpions (ADWX1, OSK1, margatoxin, kaliotoxin, charybdotoxin, noxiustoxin, anuroctoxin, OdK2) and sea anemone (ShK, ShK-F6CA, ShK-186, ShK-192, BgK), and by small molecule compounds (e.g., PAP-1, Psora-4, correolide, benzamides, CP339818, progesterone and the anti-lepromatous drug clofazimine). The K_{v}1.3 blocker clofazimine has been reported to be effective in the treatment of chronic graft-versus-host disease, cutaneous lupus, and pustular psoriasis in humans. Furthermore, clofazimine in combination with the antibiotics clarithromycin and rifabutin induced remission for about 2 years in patients with Crohn's disease, but the effect was temporary; the effect was thought to be due to anti-mycobacterial activity, but could well have been an immunomodulatory effect by clofazimine.

== See also ==
- Voltage-gated potassium channel
