= Pi1 (neurotoxin) =

Neurotoxin

Identifiers
3D model (JSmol)	Interactive image
- InChI: InChI=1S/C150H247N53O47S9/c1-10-71(6)114-144(247)189-89(53-107(159)213)130(233)178-81(26-18-45-168-149(163)164)122(225)184-85(40-49-251-9)128(231)195-96-64-254-253-62-94-121(224)172-55-108(214)174-86(27-19-46-169-150(165)166)146(249)202-47-20-29-102(202)141(244)197-98-66-257-256-65-97(194-124(227)79(180-136(96)239)23-12-15-42-152)138(241)186-87(51-74-30-32-75(208)33-31-74)120(223)171-56-109(215)175-93(117(160)220)61-252-259-68-100(176-110(216)57-173-142(245)115(72(7)206)201-129(232)84(36-39-105(157)211)182-126(229)82(34-37-103(155)209)181-127(230)83(183-137(98)240)35-38-104(156)210)147(250)203-48-21-28-101(203)140(243)188-88(52-106(158)212)131(234)190-91(59-204)133(236)179-78(22-11-14-41-151)123(226)196-99(139(242)200-114)67-258-255-63-95(193-125(228)80(24-13-16-43-153)185-143(246)113(70(4)5)199-118(221)76(154)50-69(2)3)135(238)177-77(25-17-44-167-148(161)162)119(222)170-58-111(217)198-116(73(8)207)145(248)191-92(60-205)134(237)187-90(54-112(218)219)132(235)192-94/h30-33,69-73,76-102,113-116,204-208H,10-29,34-68,151-154H2,1-9H3,(H2,155,209)(H2,156,210)(H2,157,211)(H2,158,212)(H2,159,213)(H2,160,220)(H,170,222)(H,171,223)(H,172,224)(H,173,245)(H,174,214)(H,175,215)(H,176,216)(H,177,238)(H,178,233)(H,179,236)(H,180,239)(H,181,230)(H,182,229)(H,183,240)(H,184,225)(H,185,246)(H,186,241)(H,187,237)(H,188,243)(H,189,247)(H,190,234)(H,191,248)(H,192,235)(H,193,228)(H,194,227)(H,195,231)(H,196,226)(H,197,244)(H,198,217)(H,199,221)(H,200,242)(H,201,232)(H,218,219)(H4,161,162,167)(H4,163,164,168)(H4,165,166,169)/t71-,72+,73+,76-,77-,78-,79-,80-,81-,82-,83-,84-,85-,86-,87-,88-,89-,90-,91-,92-,93-,94-,95-,96-,97-,98-,99-,100-,101-,102-,113-,114-,115-,116-/m0/s1 Key: HUOIMQISRMZWHU-JWKAOBNHSA-N
- SMILES: N[C@@]([H])(CC(C)C)C(=O)N[C@@]([H])(C(C)C)C(=O)N[C@@]([H])(CCCCN)C(=O)N[C@@]([H])(CS3)C(=O)N[C@@]([H])(CCCNC(=N)N)C(=O)NCC(=O)N[C@@]([H])([C@]([H])(O)C)C(=O)N[C@@]([H])(CO)C(=O)N[C@@]([H])(CC(=O)O)C(=O)N[C@@]([H])(CS4)C(=O)NCC(=O)N[C@@]([H])(CCCNC(=N)N)C(=O)N1[C@@]([H])(CCC1)C(=O)N[C@@]([H])(CS5)C(=O)N[C@@]([H])(CCC(=O)N)C(=O)N[C@@]([H])(CCC(=O)N)C(=O)N[C@@]([H])(CCC(=O)N)C(=O)N[C@@]([H])([C@]([H])(O)C)C(=O)NCC(=O)N[C@@]([H])(CS6)C(=O)N1[C@@]([H])(CCC1)C(=O)N[C@@]([H])(CC(=O)N)C(=O)N[C@@]([H])(CO)C(=O)N[C@@]([H])(CCCCN)C(=O)N[C@@]([H])(CS3)C(=O)N[C@@]([H])([C@]([H])(CC)C)C(=O)N[C@@]([H])(CC(=O)N)C(=O)N[C@@]([H])(CCCNC(=N)N)C(=O)N[C@@]([H])(CCSC)C(=O)N[C@@]([H])(CS4)C(=O)N[C@@]([H])(CCCCN)C(=O)N[C@@]([H])(CS5)C(=O)N[C@@]([H])(Cc1ccc(O)cc1)C(=O)NCC(=O)N[C@@]([H])(CS6)C(=O)N

Properties
Chemical formula	C_{150}H_{247}N_{53}O_{47}S_{9}
Molar mass	3833.49 g·mol^{−1}

Related compounds
Related compounds	Pandinus imperator toxin 4
- Except where otherwise noted, data are given for materials in their standard state (at 25 °C [77 °F], 100 kPa). Infobox references

Pi1 (Pandinus imperator toxin 1) is a peptide toxin found in the venom of the scorpion Pandinus imperator (emperor scorpion). It consists of 35 amino acid residues and is stabilized by four disulfide bridges. Pi1 mainly acts on voltage-gated potassium (Kv) channels by blocking the movement of potassium ions through these channels. It also binds to sites associated with small-conductance calcium-activated potassium (SK) channels. Pi1 belongs to the ⍺-KTx6 subfamily of scorpion toxins.

Pi1 has been studied for its effects on different potassium channels, particularly Kv1.2, Kv1.3 and Shaker B channels. It is also used in experimental research to see how peptide toxins interact with ion channels.

== Etymology ==
The name Pi1 is derived from the scorpion species Pandinus imperator, from which the toxin was first isolated. Pi1 stands for Pandinus imperator toxin 1. The name refers to its biological origin and designation as a toxin from this species, rather than the chemical structure or biological activity.

== Source ==
Pi1 is naturally present in the venom of the scorpion Pandinus imperator. It is one of several peptide toxins that are isolated from the venom of this species.Pi1 occurs in very low concentrations in the venom, making it difficult to isolate enough for extensive pharmacological experiments. To overcome this limitation, researchers developed a method to produce Pi1 through chemical synthesis.The chemically produced toxin is called synthetic Pi1 (sPi1). It is made using solid-phase peptide synthesis, in which amino acids are joined together to form the peptide chain. The peptide is then folded to allow the formation of its four disulfide bridges. The structure and biological activity of sPi1 were found to be consistent with those of the natural toxin, allowing it to be used in further studies.

== Chemistry ==
Pi1 is a short peptide consisting of 35 amino acid residues. Its amino acid sequence is:

LVKCRGTSDCGRPCQQQTGCPNSKCINRMCKCYGC

The C-terminus of Pi1 is amidated. The peptide contains eight cysteine residues that form four intramolecular disulfide bridges. These bridges connect the following amino acid positions:

- Cys4-Cys25
- Cys10-Cys30
- Cys14-Cys32
- Cys20-Cys35

The disulfide bridges stabilize the three-dimensional structure of the peptide. The fourth bridge, connecting Cys20 and Cys35, is an additional structural feature compared with many other short-chain scorpion toxins that contain only three disulfide bridges.

Pi1 has a characteristic α/β structural motif, also called an ⍺/β scaffold. This structure consists of an α-helix connected to an antiparallel β-sheet. Two disulfide bridges, Cys10-Cys30 and Cys14-Cys32, connect these structural elements and help maintain the arrangement. The additional disulfide bridge between Cys20 and Cys35 connects the loop between the α-helix and β-sheet to the C-terminal region.

The three-dimensional structure of Pi1 has been studied using proton nuclear magnetic resonance (H-NMR) spectroscopy. This technique provides information about the arrangement of amino acids in the folded peptide. The structure of Pi1 is similar to that of several other potassium channel-blocking scorpion toxins.

== Target ==
Pi1 primarily acts on potassium channels, which are membrane proteins that regulate the movement of potassium ions across cell membranes. These channels play an important role in controlling membrane potential and electrical activity in cells.

Pi1 has been investigated for its activity on voltage-gated potassium (Kv) channels and its interaction with small-conductance calcium-activated potassium (SK) channels.

=== Voltage-gated potassium channels ===
Pi1 blocks several types of voltage-gated potassium channels, although its effectiveness differs between channel subtypes.

In experiments using channels expressed in Xenopus laevis (Clawed frog) oocytes, synthetic Pi1 strongly inhibited rat Kv1.2 channels, with a half-maximal inhibitory concentration (IC50) of 0.44 nM. Synthetic Pi1 did not block Kv1.1 and Kv1.3 channels in oocytes. It also inhibited Shaker B channels from Drosophila, with an IC50 of 23 nM. The IC50 represents the concentration of a substance required to reduce the measured activity by 50%.

Pi1 also inhibited Shaker B channels expressed in Sf9 cells. The dissociation constant is approximately 32 nM in the absence of external potassium ions. Their experiments showed that Pi1 blocks these channels reversibly from the extracellular side of the cell membrane.

=== Small-conductance calcium-activated potassium channels ===
Pi1 also interacts with binding sites associated with small-conductance calcium-activated potassium (SK) channels. These channels are activated by changes in intracellular calcium concentration and contribute to the regulation of electrical activity in cells. This can be researched with rat brain synaptosomes. Synthetic Pi1 competed with radioactively labelled apamin (125I-apamin) for binding, with an IC50 of 55pM.

== Mode of action ==
Pi1 mainly inhibits voltage-gated potassium channels by blocking access to their extracellular side. Studies using Drosophila Shaker B channels showed that this inhibition is voltage-independent. It also demonstrated that the inhibition is reversible upon toxin removal, following a 1:1 binding stoichiometry. Extracellular K+, Rb+ and Cs+ ions destabilize the toxin-induced block, with Cs+ having the strongest effect.

The contribution of Pi1's functional dyad, consisting of Lys24 and Tyr33, to Kv1.2 channel inhibition was investigated. Synthetic and modified Pi1 lacking this dyad kept their blocking activity but were considerably less effective than native Pi1. This indicates that the dyad is not essential for channel recognition and inhibition.

Using docking simulations to reveal how Pi1 and Kv1.2 interact with each other, it was predicted that a ring, containing Arg5, Arg12, Arg28 and Lys31, from Pi1 electrostatically interacts with the Asp355 residues of the channel. It was proposed that the Lys24 residue of Pi1 would enter the channel pore, while Tyr33 and Ile26 interacted with the aromatic residue cluster of the channel, therefore proposing a way this toxin blocks Kv1.2.

== Toxicity ==
Pi1 has demonstrated neurotoxic effects in animals. When injected into the cerebral ventricles of mice, the median lethal dose (LD50) was 0.2 µg per mouse. The neurotoxicity of Pi1 was also compared with that of other scorpion toxins. Pi1 was approximately 2.5 times less neurotoxic than maurotoxin, another scorpion toxin that affects potassium channels. The symptoms observed following Pi1 injection resembled those caused by other potassium channel-targeting scorpion toxins.

It is also possible to look at modifications of Pi1 in relation toxicity. The first, [A24,A33]-Pi1, contained substitution of lysine at position 24 and tyrosine at position 33 with alanine. The second, P-Pi1, contained a phosphorylated tyrosine residue at position 33. Both modifications were lethal when injected into the cerebral ventricles. However, their toxicities were lower than that of unmodified Pi1.

== Therapeutic use ==
Pi1 has been investigated as a potassium channel inhibitor, particularly because it can block Kv1.3 channels in human T lymphocytes. These channels contribute to the electrical activity of T cells and are relevant to research on immune cell function.

Pi1 reversibly inhibits Kv1.3 channels in human T lymphocytes, with a dissociation constant of 11.4 nM. However, Pi1 has a lower affinity for these channels than the related scorpion toxins Pi2 and Pi3, which showed dissociation constants of approximately 50 pM and 0.5 nM.

Although potassium channel inhibitors have potential relevance to the study of immune cell activity, there is no evidence for therapeutic benefit of Pi1 or effectiveness as an immunosuppressive treatment.
