= Pandinus imperator (Pi3) toxin =

Pandinus Imperator toxin
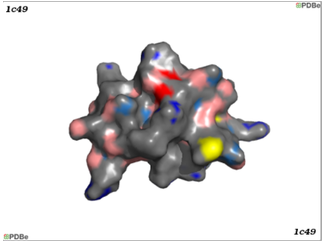
- Pi3 3D structure

Identifiers
- Organism: Pandinus Imperator
- Symbol: TISCTNEKQC YPHCKKETGY PNAKCMNRKC KCFGR
- Alt. symbols: Potassium channel toxin alpha-KTx 7.2; Pandinotoxin-beta; Potassium channel- blocking toxin 3; Pi-3; Pi3; Toxin PiTX- K- beta
- UniProt: 55928
Search for
- Structures: Swiss-model
- Domains: InterPro

Pi3 toxin is a purified peptide derivative of the Pandinus imperator scorpion venom. It is a potent blocker of voltage-gated potassium channel, K_{v}1.3 and is closely related to another peptide found in the venom, Pi2.

== Etymology & source ==
=== Etymology ===
Pi3 toxin stands for Pandinus imperator-3 toxin. It is also known as pandinotoxin-beta and toxin PiTX-K-beta. The classification of the short peptide toxins is based on the conserved cysteine residues and the phylogenetic analysis of the aminoacid sequence. Miller was the one who first used aminoacid sequence to classify these toxins and he assigned the nomenclature α-KTxm.n where m indicates the subfamily and n indicates the member within the subfamily. Pi3 thus got the name α-KTx7.2. The subfamily 7 has one other member, Pi2.

=== Sources ===
The Pi3 toxin is found in the venom of the Pandinus imperator scorpion. It belongs to a family of toxins known as α-KTx. Several peptides, named Pi1-Pi7 were purified from the Pi venom and their primary structure has been identified.

== Extraction and purification ==
Procedure
- Isolation Procedure: Chromatography
- 3D Structure: NMR Spectroscopy
- Molecular weight: 4,068

The Pandinus imperator venom can be obtained by electrical stimulation of anaesthetized scorpions. The venom can be fractionated by gel filtration chromatography and the sub-fractions can be further separated by HPLC reverse-phase column. The purity of the components can be tested by step-gradient HPLC and an automatic amino-acid sequencer.

== Chemistry ==
The three-dimensional structure of Pi3 is similar to other potassium channel blocking toxins like charybdotoxin, because it has three disulphide bridges that stabilize two strands of beta sheet structures and a short alpha helix. But Pi3 differs from many other toxins in its primary structure, e.g. toxins from scorpions of the genera Buthus which also block K^{+} channels. The amino terminal region of Pi3 lacks three residues when compared to other toxins of the same family e.g. charybdotoxin. Notably, the cysteinyl residues and lysine at position 28 which corresponds to Lys24 in Pi3 are highly conserved among most of the peptide toxins and are thought to be important for channel recognition, three-dimensional structure or both.

=== Pi3 and Pi2 ===
Pi3 and Pi2 both contain 35 amino acid residues. Pi3 has the same primary structure as Pi2 except for a single amino acid caused by point mutation of the seventh amino acid Pro7, which is neutral to Glu7, which is negative. As they differ by a single amino acid, they are used to analyze the structure-function relationship. The secondary structure shows a 3_{10} helix whereas Pi2 has alpha helix. Also, the crucial residue of the functional dyad, Lys24 (K27) is located very close to Glu7 (P10E) in Pi3.

== Target ==
The Pi3 toxin is a potent inhibitor of the Kv1.2 potassium channel, encoded by the KCNA2 gene and a less potent blocker of K_{v}1.3 channels, encoded by the KCNA3 gene and it also shows effect on voltage-gated rapidly inactivating A-type K^{+} channels.

=== Shaker B potassium channels ===
Pi3 blocks shaker B K^{+} channels expressed in Sf9 cell lines obtained from Spodoptera frugiperda. The human homologues of shaker B channels are the K_{v}1 channels. The affinity of the Pi3 for shaker B voltage- gated potassium channels was found to be low with a dissociation constant of 140 nM.The block was reversible and not voltage dependent.

=== K_{v}1.3 channel ===
Pi3 blocks the K_{v}1.3 channels in the human T lymphocytes with a K_{d} of 500 pM. The block is reversible and not voltage-dependent. Recovery of the channels from inactivation is not affected by Pi3. In addition it has been shown by ^{86}Rb efflux assay of synaptosomes that Pi3 blocks voltage-gated, rapidly inactivating channels.

== Mode of action ==
Both Pi3 and Pi2 are considered to belong to the pore blocker family. Pore blockers bind to pore of the ion channel and block the ion flux.

=== Structure-function relationship ===
Pi3 has a higher dissociation constant than Pi2. Pi3 has an 18-fold less affinity for K_{v}1.3 and 800-fold less affinity for voltage-gated, rapidly inactivating K^{+} channels in dorsal root ganglion (DRG) neurons. The variation in the primary structure of Pi3, the single amino acid Glu7 has been attributed to the difference in affinity observed between Pi3 and Pi2 in binding. The point mutation in the N- terminal sequence results in a salt bridge formation between Glu7 and Lys24 which in turn results in decreased positive electrostatic forces. The net positive charges in Pi2 and Pi3 are 7 and 6 respectively. This reduction in positive charge interferes in the binding step of the toxin and reduces its affinity for the channel thereby signifying the importance of N-terminal sequence in channel recognition. Lack of three residues in the amino acid terminal has been implicated in the inability of Pi3 and Pi2 to block BK channels.

No voltage dependent block by Pi3 and Pi2 has been observed in the shaker B K^{+} channel and the K^{+}1.3 channels in the human lymphocytes. Absence of voltage dependence of the block observed in the shaker B K^{+} channels and the K_{v}1.3 channels in human lymphocytes suggests that the toxin exerts its effect by binding to some external domain and does not sense the electric field in the transmembrane region. Pi2 is shown to fasten the recovery of K_{v}1.3 channels from inactivation whereas Pi3 has no such effect. The inability of Pi3 to enhance the recovery of channels in human lymphocytes is thought to be due to the amino acid substitution Glu7 to Pro7, but the exact mechanism is unknown.

== Toxicity ==
Pi3 is non-toxic to mammals, but it has been observed that it is toxic to insects and crustaceans.

== Uses ==
As a blocking agent, it is used to analyze the structure and function of the voltage-gated potassium channels, to identify the binding site and to decipher the functional correlates of the structural differences observed and vice versa. Pi3 is particularly useful to study the structure-function relationship as it differs from Pi2 by just one amino acid. It has been used to study the distribution of channels in various cells, most importantly the human lymphocytes and also to understand the contribution of K_{v}1.3 channels to the membrane excitability of the cells. It is important to understand exact effect of Pi3 and its binding toK_{v}1.3 channels as inhibitors of K_{v}1.3 channels might be of therapeutic use for multiple sclerosis. However no such therapeutic use has been identified yet.
