= Pi5 =

Pi5 toxin is a peptide found in the venom of the African emperor scorpion Pandinus imperator. Pi5 inhibits human Kv1.2 and Kv1.3 channels as well as Drosophila Shaker B potassium channels.

== Etymology and source ==
Pi5 is a peptide that is purified from the venom of the African scorpion Pandinus imperator. Pi in Pi5 is short for the 5th identified peptide of the scorpion Pandinus imperator. As of July 2017, a total of 7 peptides purified from the venom of this scorpion have been characterized (Pi1-7).

== Chemistry ==
Pi5 is part of the toxin family α-KTx. KTx is the abbreviation of kaliotoxin, which is a potassium channel toxin. There are three KTx families: α-, β- and γ-KTx. The classification of toxins into these families is based on the size of the peptides, their chronological appearance, toxicity to humans, and ion-channel specificity. Pi5 belongs to the α-KTx family because it is a short-chain toxin in the venom of a scorpion. Furthermore, the α-KTx family is divided in subfamilies, classified by the alignment of cysteine. A nomenclature α-KTx m.n. in which m represents the subfamily and n represents the member of that subfamily has been proposed. Pi5 has been given the systematic name of α-KTx 24.1, being the first member in the 24th subfamily of α-KTx toxins.

The Pi5 peptide has a molecular weight of 3334.00 Da. and contains 33 amino acids. Eight of the amino acids are cysteines, and they form a total of four disulfide bonds. The amino acid sequence of Pi5 is: VAKCSTSECGHACQQAGCRNSGCRYGSCICVGC.

== Target ==
Pi5 blocks Drosophila Shaker B K+ channels as well as human Kv1.2 and Kv1.3 channels.

=== Drosophila Shaker B K+ channels ===
Pi5 blocks Drosophila Shaker B K^{+} channels with low affinity. The inhibition of these Shaker B K^{+} channels is reversible. The dissociation constant (K_{d}) of the inhibition is 540 nM.

=== hKv1.2 and hKv 1.3 channels ===
Pi5 inhibits the human voltage-dependent potassium channels Kv1.2 and Kv1.3. These channels are coded respectively by the genes KCNA2 and KCNA3 and their inhibition is reversible. hKv1.2 is inhibited with a K_{d} of 92 nM and hKv1.3 with a K_{d} of 77 nM.

== Mode of action ==
The Pi5 toxin scales down the ion currents through ion channels. The kinetics of the channels remain unaltered. Furthermore, the blockage of the channels is not voltage-dependent, which is often found with K_{v} channel blocker toxins.

== Toxicity ==
The venom of Pandinus imperator is not lethal to humans.
