= Pandinus imperator toxin 4 =

Scorpion toxin

Identifiers
3D model (JSmol)	Interactive image
- InChI: InChI=1S/C168H273N57O52S8/c1-11-79(4)126(176)157(269)205-98(47-49-124(239)240)135(247)193-83(8)132(244)220-127(80(5)12-2)159(271)206-95(33-23-55-186-166(179)180)140(252)214-107-71-278-284-77-113-154(266)221-128(81(6)13-3)160(272)212-103(63-119(175)234)146(258)201-93(31-17-21-53-172)142(254)223-130(85(10)229)161(273)219-112-76-283-281-74-110(217-147(259)104(64-125(241)242)210-137(249)94(32-22-54-185-165(177)178)202-148(260)105(69-226)195-121(236)66-189-120(235)65-190-134(107)246)153(265)209-101(61-87-40-44-89(231)45-41-87)145(257)207-99(35-25-57-188-168(183)184)162(274)224-58-26-37-116(224)156(268)218-111-75-282-280-73-109(215-139(251)92(203-151(112)263)30-16-20-52-171)152(264)208-100(60-86-38-42-88(230)43-39-86)133(245)191-67-122(237)196-108(149(261)213-106(70-227)164(276)277)72-279-285-78-114(163(275)225-59-27-36-115(225)155(267)211-102(62-118(174)233)144(256)194-82(7)131(243)198-90(138(250)216-113)28-14-18-50-169)197-123(238)68-192-158(270)129(84(9)228)222-143(255)96(34-24-56-187-167(181)182)200-136(248)91(29-15-19-51-170)199-141(253)97(204-150(111)262)46-48-117(173)232/h38-45,79-85,90-116,126-130,226-231H,11-37,46-78,169-172,176H2,1-10H3,(H2,173,232)(H2,174,233)(H2,175,234)(H,189,235)(H,190,246)(H,191,245)(H,192,270)(H,193,247)(H,194,256)(H,195,236)(H,196,237)(H,197,238)(H,198,243)(H,199,253)(H,200,248)(H,201,258)(H,202,260)(H,203,263)(H,204,262)(H,205,269)(H,206,271)(H,207,257)(H,208,264)(H,209,265)(H,210,249)(H,211,267)(H,212,272)(H,213,261)(H,214,252)(H,215,251)(H,216,250)(H,217,259)(H,218,268)(H,219,273)(H,220,244)(H,221,266)(H,222,255)(H,223,254)(H,239,240)(H,241,242)(H,276,277)(H4,177,178,185)(H4,179,180,186)(H4,181,182,187)(H4,183,184,188)/t79-,80-,81-,82-,83-,84+,85+,90-,91-,92-,93-,94-,95-,96-,97-,98-,99-,100-,101-,102-,103-,104-,105-,106-,107-,108-,109-,110-,111-,112-,113-,114-,115-,116-,126-,127-,128-,129-,130-/m0/s1 Key: CKTQXRSHCBKMLT-ZEHPURADSA-N
- SMILES: N[C@@]([H])([C@]([H])(CC)C)C(=O)N[C@@]([H])(CCC(=O)O)C(=O)N[C@@]([H])(C)C(=O)N[C@@]([H])([C@]([H])(CC)C)C(=O)N[C@@]([H])(CCCNC(=N)N)C(=O)N[C@@]([H])(CS3)C(=O)NCC(=O)NCC(=O)N[C@@]([H])(CO)C(=O)N[C@@]([H])(CCCNC(=N)N)C(=O)N[C@@]([H])(CC(=O)O)C(=O)N[C@@]([H])(CS4)C(=O)N[C@@]([H])(Cc1ccc(O)cc1)C(=O)N[C@@]([H])(CCCNC(=N)N)C(=O)N1[C@@]([H])(CCC1)C(=O)N[C@@]([H])(CS5)C(=O)N[C@@]([H])(CCC(=O)N)C(=O)N[C@@]([H])(CCCCN)C(=O)N[C@@]([H])(CCCNC(=N)N)C(=O)N[C@@]([H])([C@]([H])(O)C)C(=O)NCC(=O)N[C@@]([H])(CS6)C(=O)N1[C@@]([H])(CCC1)C(=O)N[C@@]([H])(CC(=O)N)C(=O)N[C@@]([H])(C)C(=O)N[C@@]([H])(CCCCN)C(=O)N[C@@]([H])(CS3)C(=O)N[C@@]([H])([C@]([H])(CC)C)C(=O)N[C@@]([H])(CC(=O)N)C(=O)N[C@@]([H])(CCCCN)C(=O)N[C@@]([H])([C@]([H])(O)C)C(=O)N[C@@]([H])(CS4)C(=O)N[C@@]([H])(CCCCN)C(=O)N[C@@]([H])(CS5)C(=O)N[C@@]([H])(Cc1ccc(O)cc1)C(=O)NCC(=O)N[C@@]([H])(CS6)C(=O)N[C@@]([H])(CO)C(=O)O

Properties
Chemical formula	C_{168}H_{273}N_{57}O_{52}S_{8}
Molar mass	4179.86 g·mol^{−1}

Related compounds
Related compounds	Pandinus imperator toxin 1
- Except where otherwise noted, data are given for materials in their standard state (at 25 °C [77 °F], 100 kPa). Infobox references

Pandinus imperator toxin (Pi4; α-KTx 6.4) is a short toxin from the emperor scorpion (Pandinus imperator) that blocks specific potassium channels.

== Etymology ==
The name Pi4 is the fourth toxin isolated from the scorpion Pandinus imperator, from which Pi1, Pi2, Pi3, and Pi7 have also been isolated.

== Chemistry ==
Pi4 is a peptide, which consists of 38 amino-acids with the following sequence:

IEAIRCGGSRDCYRPCQKRTGCPNAKCINKTCKCYGCS

It contains an α-helix and a β-sheet; it is stabilized by four cysteine-pairings that are crosslinked by four short disulfide bridges. The four disulfide bridges are characteristic for the α-KTX6 subfamily, while most other scorpion toxins contain only three disulfide bridges. The cysteines of Pi4 are paired in the following order: ^{6}C–^{27}C; ^{12}C–^{32}C; ^{16}C–^{34}C; ^{22}C–^{37}C.

Most disulfide bridges show a left-handed conformation, although in the disulfide bridge between ^{22}C–^{37}C some variation is found. Only the disulfide bridge between ^{6}C–^{27}C shows a right-handed conformation.

== Target and mode of action ==
Pi4 blocks different potassium channels, for instance, the Shaker B, K_{v}1.2, and SK potassium channels.

=== Shaker B channel ===
Pi4 binds to Shaker B potassium channels, the Drosophila homologue of the voltage-gated potassium channel K_{v}1.1. Pi4 reversibly blocks this channel with an IC_{50} of 3.0 ± 2.2 nM.

A Pi4 peptide, synthesized with a different C-terminus than the natural Pi4 (COO- instead of COH_{2}N), shows the same binding characteristics as natural Pi4. This suggests that the C-terminus of the peptide Pi4 is not involved in the binding of Pi4 to the Shaker B channel.

The residues ^{26}K, ^{28}I, ^{29}N, ^{33}K, and ^{35}Y might be important for Pi4's interaction with Shaker B channels, especially ^{26}K and ^{35}Y, which form a conserved dyad of a lysine and aromatic cluster in other potassium channel toxins. It has been suggested that the positive charge of the lysine mimicks a potassium ion and enters the pore of the potassium channel, hence occluding the pore opening and inhibiting the ion flux.

=== Kv1.2 channel ===
Pi4 blocks the voltage-gated potassium channel K_{v}1.2. at low concentrations (IC_{50} 8.0 ± 5 pM). No significant effects have been observed on Kv1.1 and Kv1.3 channels at concentrations up to 10 μm.

In the binding of the peptide Pi4 to the K_{v}1.2 channel, the β-sheet structure is thought to play an important role. First, the residue ^{35}Y, located in the β-sheet structure, tightly interacts via electrostatic forces with the aromatic cluster of Kv1.2 channels (^{344}W, ^{345}W and ^{355}Y). Second, the residue ^{26}K becomes stabilized by the four carbonyl oxygen atoms located in the channel of pore formed by four Kv1.2 α-subunits (^{357}D). Finally, the four ^{332}Q residues of the four α-subunits of Kv1.2 channels interact via salt bridges with four subunits of the toxin ring (composed of ^{10}R, ^{19}R, ^{30}K, ^{33}K).

=== SK-channel ===
Furthermore, the Pi4 binds to SK channels, small conductance Ca^{2+}-activated potassium channels. Pi4 competes with apamin, another SK-channel toxin. IC_{50} is 0.5 ± 0.2 μM.

== Toxicity ==
Scorpion venoms can be toxic for mammals, insects, and crustaceans. Pi4 is lethal in mice upon injection in the ventricular system of the brain at and LD_{50} value of 0.2 μg/mouse.
