= Lq2 =

Lq2 is a component of the venom of the scorpion Leiurus quinquestriatus. It blocks various potassium channels, among others the inward-rectifier potassium ion channel ROMK1.

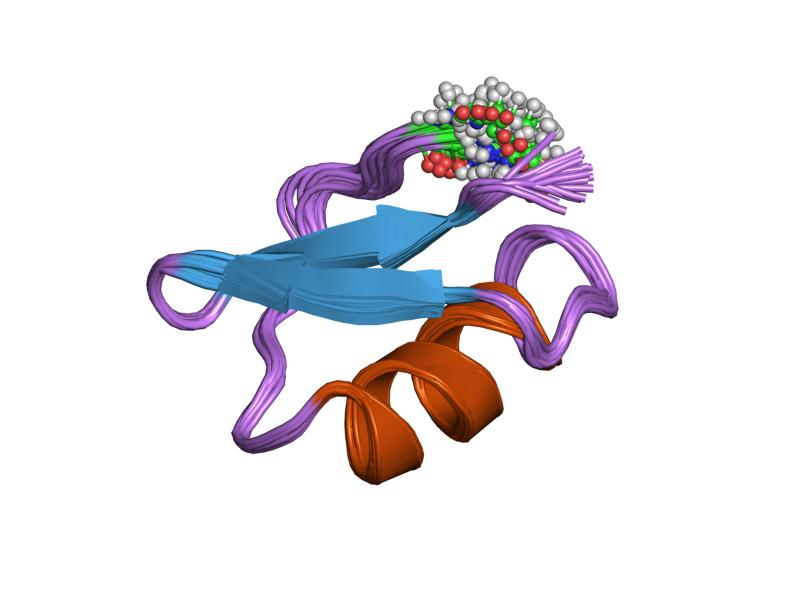
Lq2

== Alternative names ==
Lq2 is also known as Potassium channel toxin alpha-KTx 1.2, Charybdotoxin-2, ChTX-Lq2, ChTx-d, Toxin 18-2 or Lqh 18-2.

== Etymology ==
The name Lq2 refers to the name of the animal species in which the toxin can be found. Lq2 can be found in the scorpion Leiurus quinquestriatus (Lq). Lq2 is structurally similar to Lq1, which had been found previously and which is also a potassium channel blocker.

== Sources ==
Lq2 is a component of the venom of the scorpion Leiurus quinquestriatus, known under various names, for example the deathstalker, the Israeli desert scorpion or the yellow scorpion.

== Structure ==
Lq2 is a small peptide of 37 amino acids. Lq2 contains the classical scorpion toxin alpha-beta scaffold and is structurally similar to the neurotoxin Charybdotoxin (CTX). Lq2 consists of an α-helix and a β-sheet, connected by an αβ3 loop containing disulfide bridges. The proteins three-dimensional structure has been reconstructed using nuclear magnetic resonance techniques.

== Target ==
Lq2 interacts with all three types of potassium channels: the voltage-activated, the Ca^{2+}- activated and the inward-rectifier potassium channels. The unique trait of Lq2 is its high affinity for certain inward-rectifier potassium ion channels, especially the Renal Outer Medullary Potassium channel ROMK1. This ion channel contributes to the regulation of the resting membrane potential.

== Mode of action ==
Since all potassium channels share the same ion conducting outer pore structure, Lq2 binds to all three potassium channel types. Lq2 interacts with the T-X-X-T-X-GT-X-X-T-X-GY/F-Gt K+-selective section within the pore-forming region (P-region) of the ROMK1 ion channel. It blocks the channel, binding in a 1:1 stoichiometric ratio with its β-sheet.

== Therapeutic use ==
Potential use of Lq2 is mainly in cardiovascular diseases.
