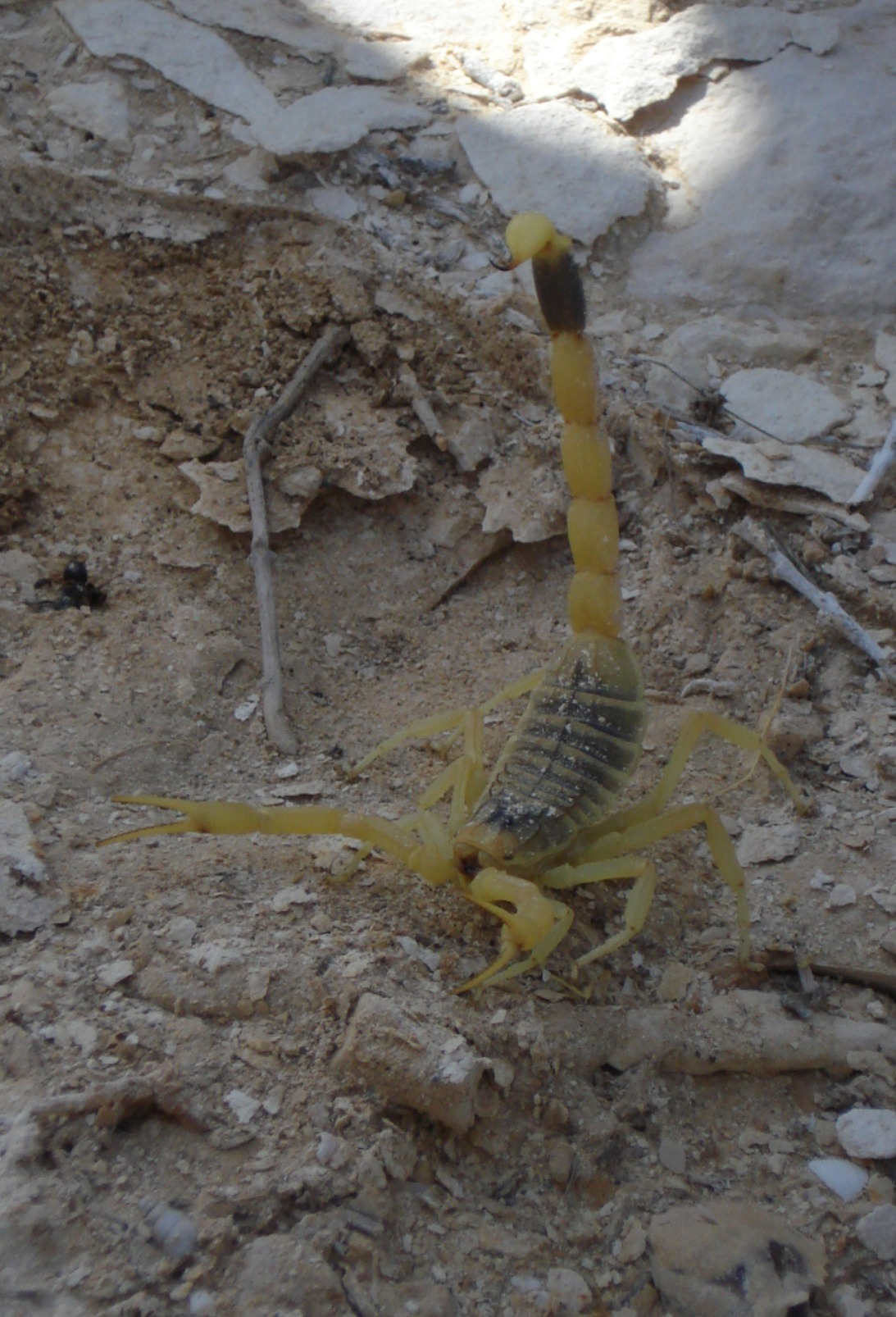

Scientific classification
- Kingdom: Animalia
- Phylum: Arthropoda
- Subphylum: Chelicerata
- Class: Arachnida
- Order: Scorpiones
- Family: Buthidae
- Genus: Leiurus
- Species: L. abdullahbayrami

Binomial name
- Leiurus abdullahbayrami Lowe, Yagmur & Kovaric, 2009

= Leiurus abdullahbayrami =

Species of scorpion

Leiurus abdullahbayrami is a species of scorpion in the family Buthidae. Its venom is highly toxic to humans, but can be used in medical development.

== Taxonomy ==
Leiurus abdullahbayram was originally considered conspecific with the deathstalker (L. quinquestriatus), but was reclassified in 2009 based on mitochondrial DNA analyses.

== Description ==
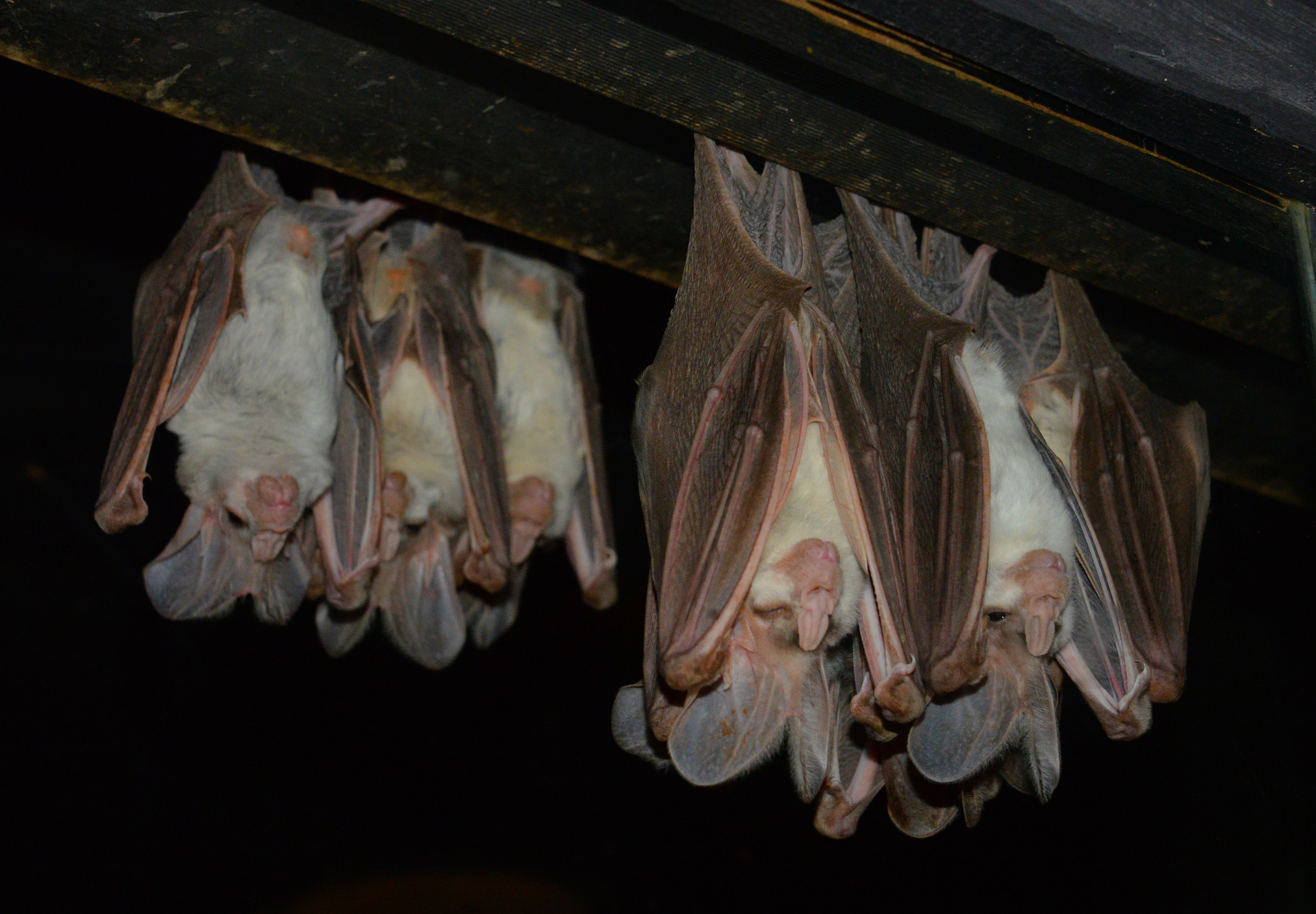
Leiurus abdullahbayrami predators

Leiurus abdullahbayrami has a brown cephalothorax, yellow legs, head, and tail. One of the very end segments of the tail is brown instead of yellow.

In scientific terms, the background color of the prosoma, mesosoma, and segment V of metasoma is black and the appendages of the Leiurus Abdullahbayrami are yellowish. The centrolateral and posteriomedian carinae (at the end of the pinchers) are fused together and lyre-shaped is formed. It has fixed fingers with 11 oblique granule rows. It has movable fingers of pedipalps with 4 distal and 11 oblique granule rows. The ventrolateral carinae of metasomal segment V have large and rounded granules. The anal arch has 6 small lobes posteriorly and 3 rounded lobes laterally. The pedipalp length/width ratio average differs between the males and the females. In females the ratio is around 4.49, and in males the ratio is around 4.54. Legs I-III have bristlecombs, and legs IV do not have bristlecombs. Their pectinal tooth counts also differ in males and females. In males the tooth count is 37-38, and in females the tooth count is 30-34. Leiurus abdullahbayrami has shorter segments than those seen in the Deathstalker.

== Distribution and habitat ==
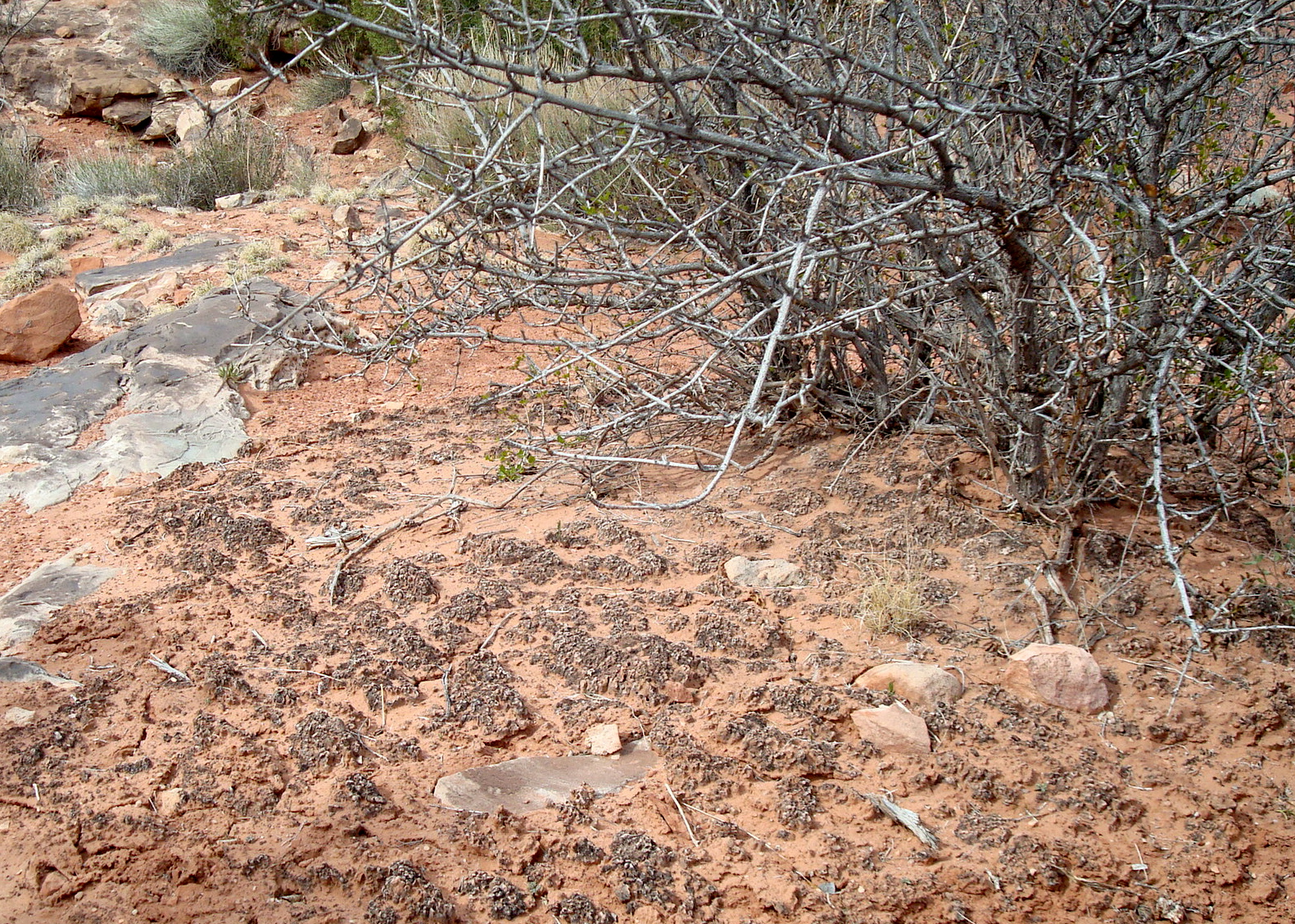
Typical L. abdullahbayrami habitat. They may be found under rocks or in small rock cavities.

Leiurus abdullahbayrami can be found in rocky areas with short and scattered vegetation, in semi-arid regions on dry calcareous soils. They tend to keep away from human settlements. Leiurus abdullahbayrami was found to share the same habitat with Scorpio maurus.

== Diet ==
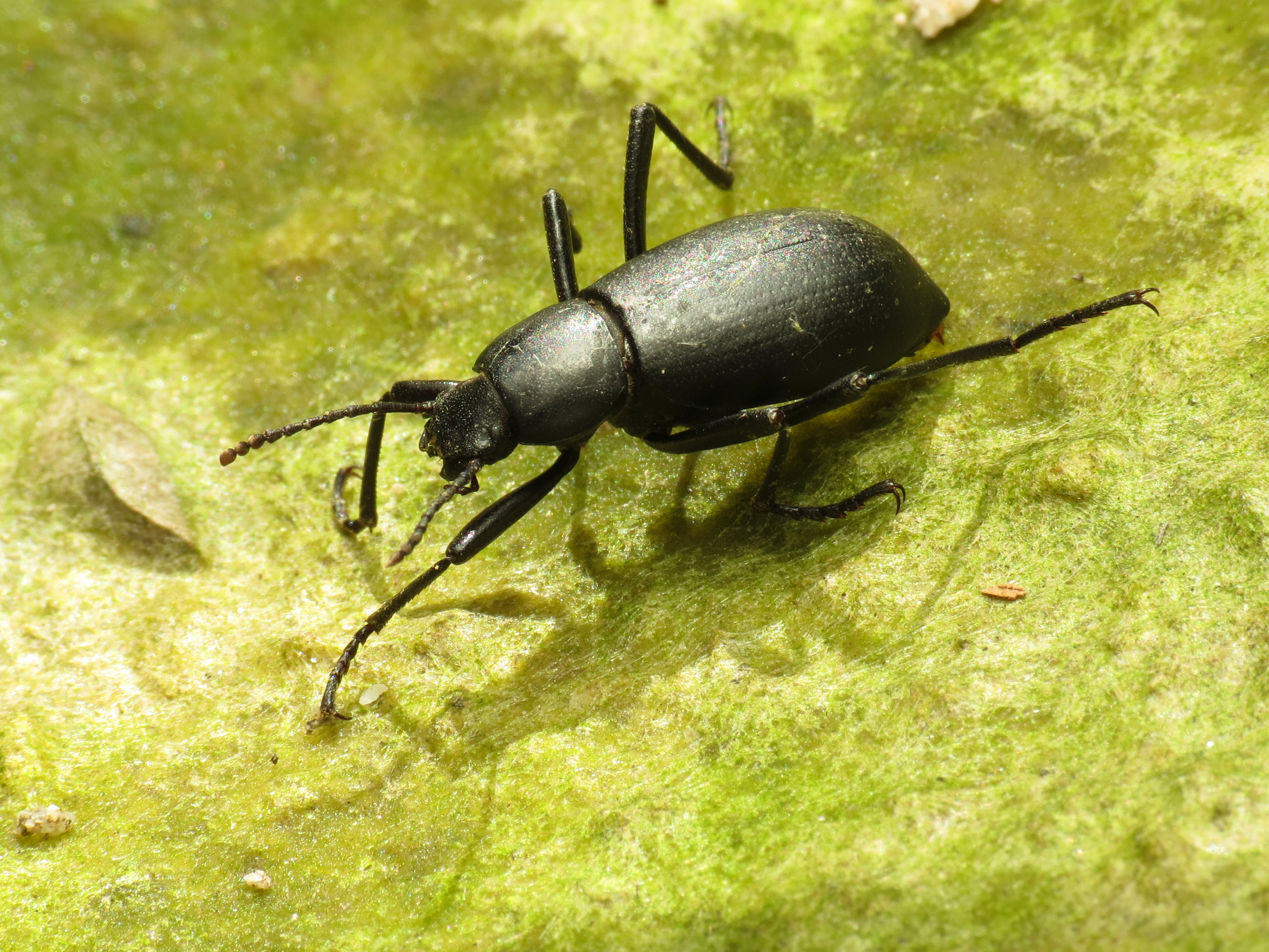
Leiurus abdullahbayrami prey

Scorpions will eat anything they can hold onto long enough to paralyze it. They can eat enough in one meal to not eat again for weeks or months. This means that they can eat small snakes, lizards, or rodents if they can hold onto them long enough to inject their venom and kill them. The most common food scorpions eat in the desert is beetles. They also eat grasshoppers, Locusts, centipedes, spiders, and ants. They hunt their prey by catching or crushing it and then injecting their venom. They are nocturnal, and tend to be more active on moonless nights because birds, bats, and mice prey on them.

== Reproduction ==
Scorpions reproduce sexually. The first phase of the reproduction cycle begins in late spring and early autumn. It begins with finding a mate. The male will leave his den and begin searching for a mature female. The male will dig at the entrance of her den until she appears. The combination of pheromones and vibrations are what makes the female appear. Once she appears, she is not ready for physical contact with the male, and he calms her by injecting slight doses of his venom into her pedipalp or cephalothorax. After this, the male will hold onto her pedipalp and take control of her. They will move in all different directions and look like they are dancing in perfect harmony. The male then find the perfect place on the ground to deposit his spermatophore, and then he guides the female to stand over it to introduce it to her genital opening. After this, the male quickly leaves to avoid being eaten by the female. The scorplings are born after 122–277 days, and the mother can deliver 35-87 of them.

== Venom ==
Scorpions have two venom glands that produce venom. This venom is used for hunting and self-defense. Only a small portion of scorpions are considered harmful to humans, but life-threatening symptoms are caused from only one sting. There are about 50 species of scorpions that cause fatal scorpionism worldwide. The venom from Leiurus abdullahbayrami can be very toxic. The venom of this species is one of the most potent venoms of the Turkish scorpions, and it provokes severe symptoms in the victims. Proteins make up half of the dry weight of the crude venom. The venom in this species stimulates voltage-gated sodium and potassium channels. This venom is very toxic in humans. A 30-year old male was stung by a female L. abdullahbayrami on the tip of his right thumb. Upon arrival to the hospital he had local pain at the site of the bite. He received sodium chloride and a local painkiller. After one hour, the site was reddened, severe pain would come in waves and last about four minutes, and seizures started to occur. After two hours small pimples and blisters started to occur at the site. The patient was in pain for about 6 hours and was sent home. He was unable to vertically move his arm. The pain and blisters went away after ten days. The sting and venom is much worse in children. In children the venom causes severe systolic dysfunction and Pulmonary edema. The sting impairs the left ventricle contractility and heart failure occurs. It is very important that early echocardiographic examination is done in patients who have been stung. The venom was tested in rats, and its effects were compared to the effects of Arabian fat-tailed scorpion (Androctonus crassicauda) venom. It was found that the venom of L. abdullahbayrami had a greater effect on the rats. These findings suggest that L. abdullahbayrami might pose a serious health threat to infants due to their smaller body weight.

== Medical uses ==
The venom of scorpions in general and of this species in particular has been employed in research on treating nervous, immune, infection, cardiovascular and neoplastic diseases.
