= Agitoxin =

Scorpion short toxin
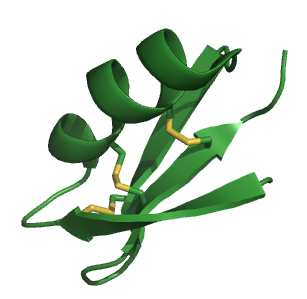
- Agitoxin-2. Disulphide bonds are highlighted. PDB 1agt

Identifiers
- Symbol: Toxin_2
- Pfam: PF00451
- Pfam clan: CL0054
- InterPro: IPR001947
- PROSITE: PDOC00875
- OPM superfamily: 58
- OPM protein: 3odv
Available protein structures:
- PDB: IPR001947 PF00451 (ECOD; PDBsum)
- AlphaFold: IPR001947; PF00451

Agitoxin is a toxin found in the venom of the scorpion Leiurus quinquestriatus hebraeus (yellow scorpion). Other toxins found in this species include charybdotoxin (CTX). CTX is a close homologue of Agitoxin.

== Structure ==
Agitoxin can be purified using HPLC techniques.

Primary structure:

Three types of agitoxin can be distinguished, each identified as comprising 38 amino acids. They are highly homologous, differing only in the identity of the residues at positions 7, 15, 29 and 31.

- Agitoxin-1 Gly-Val-Pro-Ile-Asn-Val-Lys-Cys-Thr-Gly-Ser-Pro-Gln-Cys-Leu-Lys-Pro-Cys-Lys-Asp-Ala-Gly-Met-Arg-Phe-Gly-Lys-Cys-Ile-Asn-Gly-Lys-Cys-His-Cys-Thr-Pro-Lys (GVPINVKCTGSPQCLKPCKDAGMRFGKCINGKCHCTPK, molecular weight = 4014.87 Da, molecular formula = C_{169}H_{278}N_{52}O_{47}S_{7})
- Agitoxin-2 Gly-Val-Pro-Ile-Asn-Val-Ser-Cys-Thr-Gly-Ser-Pro-Gln-Cys-Ile-Lys-Pro-Cys-Lys-Asp-Ala-Gly-Met-Arg-Phe-Gly-Lys-Cys-Met-Asn-Arg-Lys-Cys-His-Cys-Thr-Pro-Lys (GVPINVSCTGSPQCIKPCKDAGMRFGKCMNRKCHCTPK, molecular weight = 4090.95 Da, molecular formula = C_{169}H_{278}N_{54}O_{48}S_{8})
- Agitoxin-3 Gly-Val-Pro-Ile-Asn-Val-Pro-Cys-Thr-Gly-Ser-Pro-Gln-Cys-Ile-Lys-Pro-Cys-Lys-Asp-Ala-Gly-Met-Arg-Phe-Gly-Lys-Cys-Met-Asn-Arg-Lys-Cys-His-Cys-Thr-Pro-Lys (GVPINVPCTGSPQCIKPCKDAGMRFGKCMNRKCHCTPK, molecular weight = 4100.98 Da, molecular formula = C_{171}H_{280}N_{54}O_{47}S_{8}, CAS Number 155646-23-4)

Secondary and tertiary structure:

Agitoxin consists of a triple-stranded antiparallel beta-sheet in which the C-terminal strand sits in the centre of the sheet, and a single alpha-helix covering one face of the beta-sheet (see image on the right). The cysteine side chains connect the beta-sheet and the helix via disulphide bonds to form the core of the molecule.

The fold of agitoxin is homologous to the previously determined folds of scorpion venom toxins, classified as 'Scorpion short toxins' by Pfam. This fold, and the location of the disulphide bonds, are a shared element between toxins stemming from arthropods. The structure of agitoxin-2, has been determined by NMR.

== Function ==
Agitoxin binds to the Shaker K^{+} channel in Drosophila as well as to its mammalian homologue. It blocks this channel by binding with high affinity (K_{d} < 1 nmol/L) to its external vestibule.

This high affinity to the 'Shaker K' channel is dependent on the residues of Arg ^{24}, Lys ^{27}, and Arg ^{31}. The ability of the agitoxin to block the 'Shaker K' channel suggests a docking mechanism whereby the toxin sits on the channel and then prevents its opening through flexible movements of the side chains thereby allowing for various protein-protein complexes to be enacted. AgTx2 has been found to undergo conformational changes when bound to the 'Shaker K' channel which suggests the induced fit model may be present in toxin-channel interaction. This mode of interaction goes along with and explains the flexible side chains. The amino acid make up of the toxin determines the way each interacts with Shaker K channels.

In Agitoxin, for example, the arginine interacts electrostatically with the aspartate of the 'Shaker K' channel. The final blocking of the pore in the Shaker K + channel occurs via the side chain of Lys ^{27}. Lys ^{27} interacts with the Shaker K by plugging the selectivity filter and hydrogen bonding with carbonyls of Tyr ^{395} of each potassium channel subunit. Important stabilizing hydrogen bonding between various residues on the AgTx2 and the subunits of the channel hold the toxin-channel complex together. Mutations in Arg24Ala, Lys27Met, and Asn30Ala increased the dissociation, or break-down, of the complex, suggesting they all play important roles in holding the toxin on the channel.
