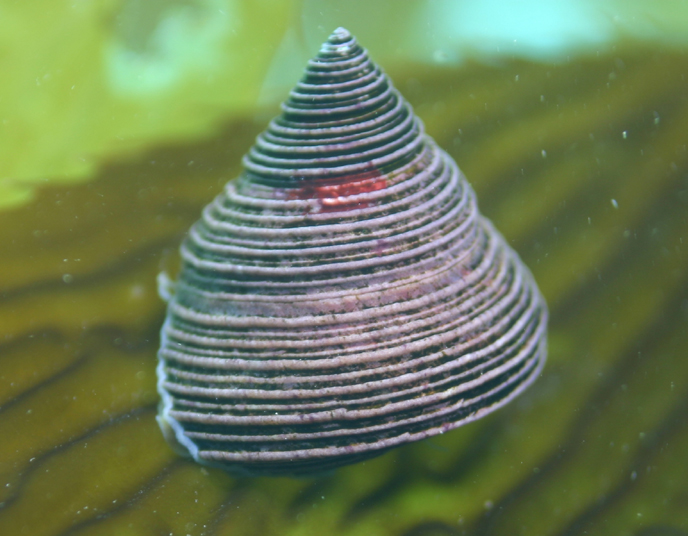

Scientific classification
- Kingdom: Animalia
- Phylum: Mollusca
- Class: Gastropoda
- Subclass: Vetigastropoda
- Order: Trochida
- Family: Calliostomatidae
- Genus: Calliostoma
- Species: C. canaliculatum

Binomial name
- Calliostoma canaliculatum (Lightfoot, 1786)

Synonyms
- Calliostoma dolarium (Holten); Tristichotrochus canaliculatus Sasao & Habe, 1973; Trochus canaliculatus Martyn; Trochus dolarius Chemnitz; Ziziphinus canaliculatus Martyn in Reeve

= Calliostoma canaliculatum =

Species of gastropod

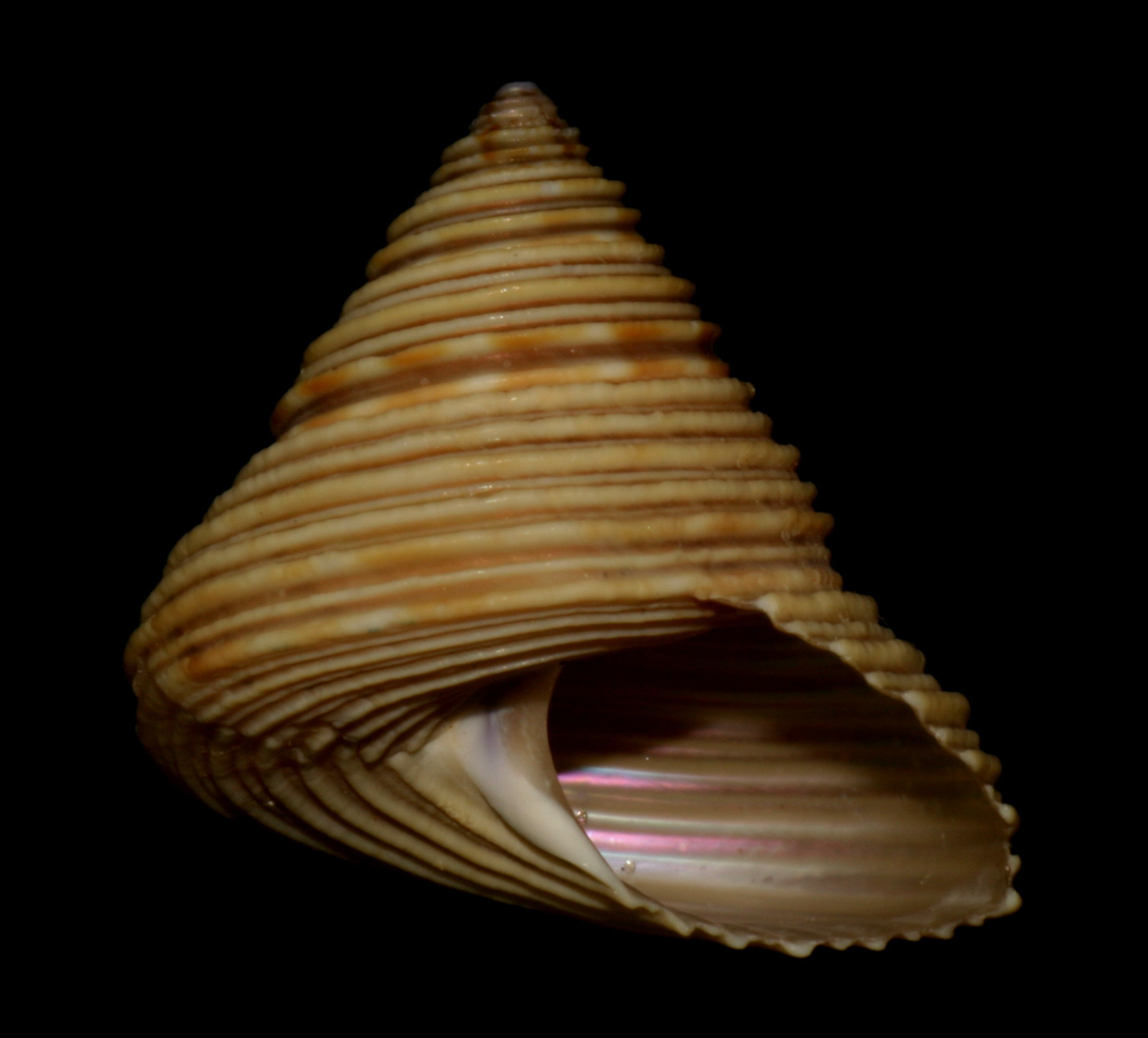
Shell of Calliostoma canaliculatum, 22.7 mm height by 22.9 mm diameter, collected intertidally at Friday Harbor, Washington

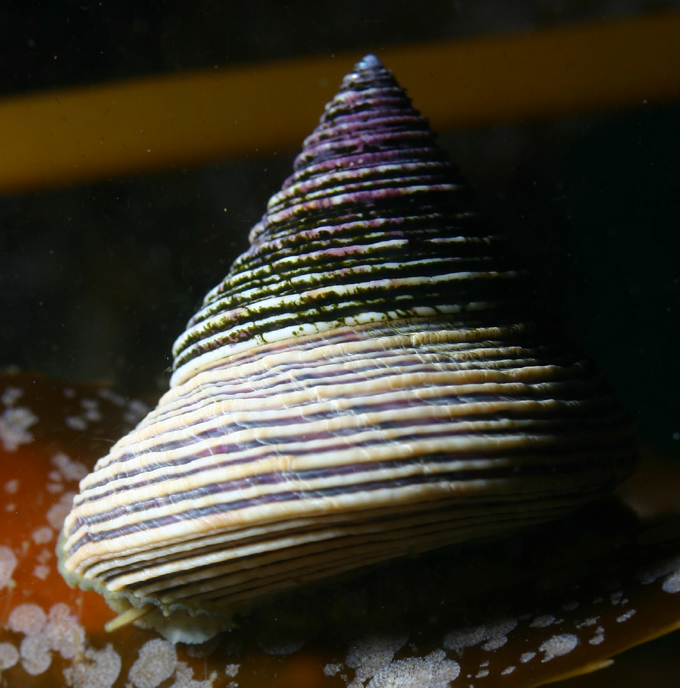
A living specimen of Calliostoma canaliculatum

Calliostoma canaliculatum, common name the channeled topsnail, is a species of small sea snail with gills and an operculum, a marine gastropod mollusk in the family Calliostomatidae, the calliostoma top snails.

The name of the species Calliostoma canaliculatum (Sasao & Habe, 1973) is preoccupied in Calliostoma, by Calliostoma canaliculatum (Lightfoot, 1786), but not in Tristichotrochus, which is where it is placed by some authors. It is currently a secondary homonym but it has not replaced the preoccupied name because the replacement name would be synonymized sooner or later.

== Description ==
Size of the shell varies between 16 mm and 39 mm.

Shell white to buff with raised spiral ribs, interspaces brownish, a small blue stain adjacent to the columnella. Height 15 to 35 mm.

The thin, imperforate shell has a conical shape with a flat base It is fawn colored with yellowish white lirae. The surface of the whorls is encircled by numerous sharply sculptured, smooth, narrow, cord-like lirae, subequal or alternately smaller. The base contains 11 to 13 similar ones. On the upper whorls the lirae are fewer, and in well preserved individuals the second whorl is minutely beaded above. The spire is conic, with nearly straight outlines. The sutures are impressed. The spire contains 7-8 whorls, with the last obtusely angular, flat beneath and impressed around the axis. The oblique aperture is rhombic, iridescent and sulcated inside. The thin peristome is acute. The columella is straightened, not truncate below, dilated in a pearly iridescent pad above, bounded by an opaque white deposit.

Its mucus contains the toxin BrMT.

== Distribution ==
Sitka, Alaska to Camalu, northern Baja California, Mexico.

== Habitat ==
On Kelp leaves in deep water: reefs off Santa Barbara, California.
