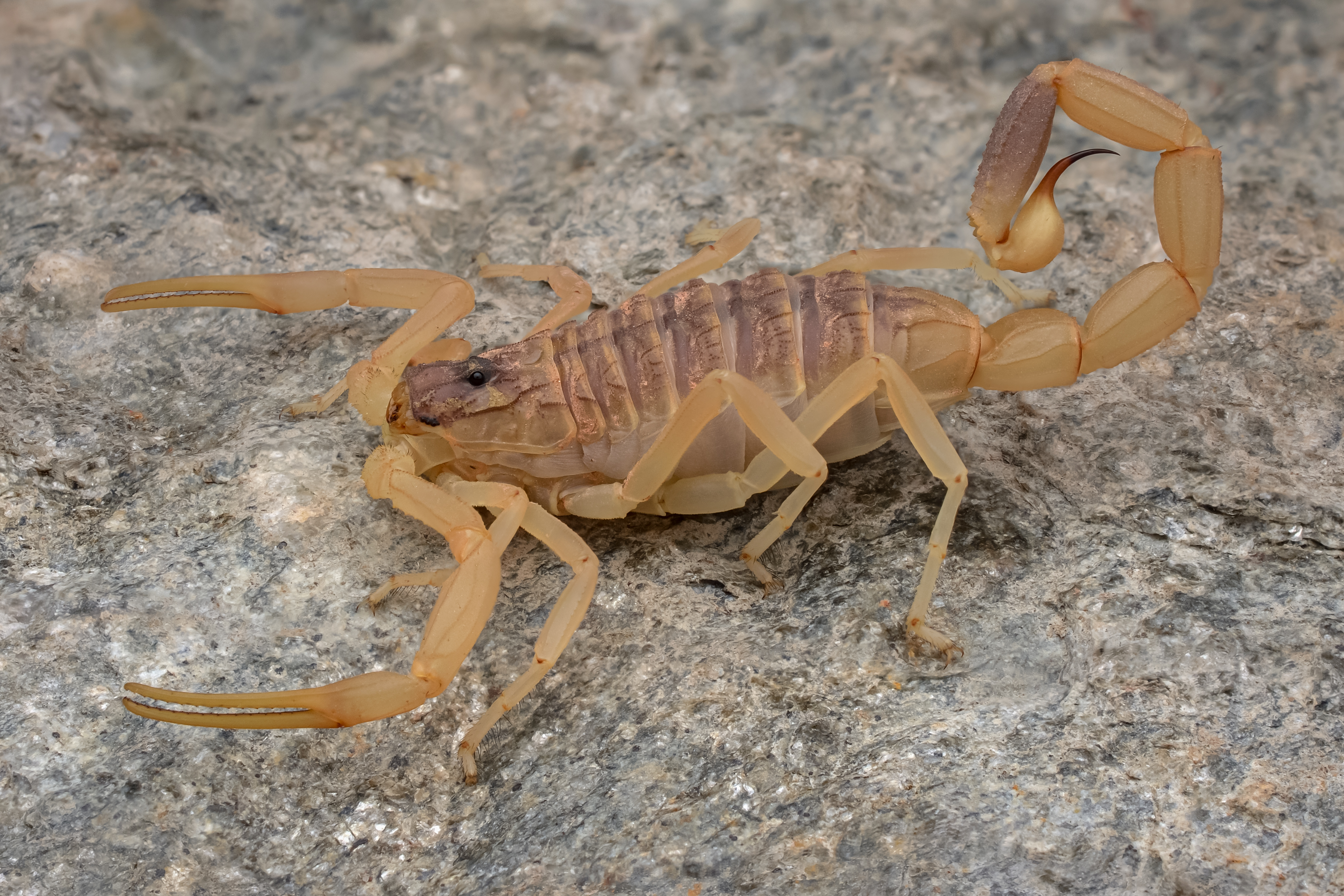
- Leiurus quinquestriatus (Ehrenberg, 1828)

Scientific classification
- Kingdom: Animalia
- Phylum: Arthropoda
- Subphylum: Chelicerata
- Class: Arachnida
- Order: Scorpiones
- Family: Buthidae
- Genus: Leiurus; Ehrenberg, 1828

Type species
- Androctonus (Leiurus) quinquestriatus Ehrenberg, 1828

Diversity
- About 20 species

= Leiurus =

Genus of scorpions

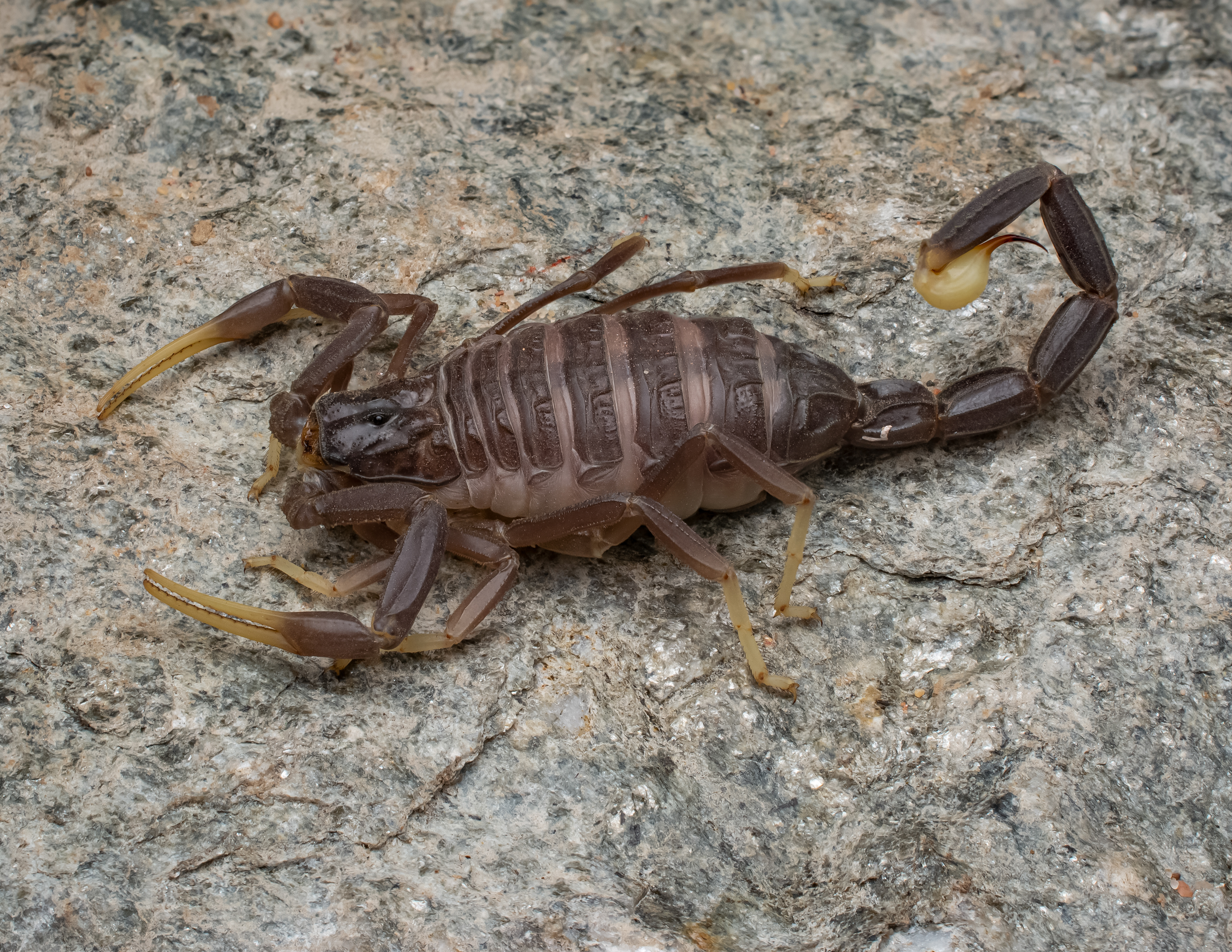
Leiurus jordanensis adult female in captivity

Leiurus is a genus of scorpion of the family Buthidae. The most common species, L. quinquestriatus, is also known under the common name Deathstalker. It is distributed widely across North Africa and the Middle East, including the western and southern Arabian Peninsula and southeastern Turkey. At least one species occurs in West Africa (northern Cameroon).

== Taxonomy ==
The genus was introduced in 1828 by C.G. Ehrenberg (in Hemprich & Ehrenberg 1828), originally as a subgenus of the genus Androctonus. It was finally elevated to genus rank by M. Vachon in 1949. The genus was long considered to be monotypic, containing a single species, L. quinquestriatus, but research since 2002 has shown that there are indeed several species.

=== Diversity ===
Currently twenty species are recognized within this genus.

- Leiurus abdullahbayrami Yagmur, Koc & Kunt, 2009
- Leiurus aegyptiacus Lourenço & El-Hennawy, 2021
- Leiurus arabicus Lowe, Yagmur & Kovarik, 2014
- Leiurus ater Lourenço, 2019
- Leiurus aylaensis Abu Afifeh, Al-Saraireh & Amr, 2025
- Leiurus brachycentrus Ehrenberg, 1829
- Leiurus dekeyseri Lourenço, 2020
- Leiurus gubanensis Kovarik & Lowe, 2020
- Leiurus haenggii Lowe, Yagmur & Kovarik, 2014
- Leiurus heberti Lowe, Yagmur & Kovarik, 2014
- Leiurus hebraeus Birula, 1908
- Leiurus hoggarensis Lourenço, Kourim & Sadine, 2018
- Leiurus kuwaiti Lourenço, 2020
- Leiurus jordanensis Lourenço, Modry & Amr, 2002
- Leiurus macroctenus Lowe, Yagmur & Kovarik, 2014
- Leiurus maculatus Lourenço, 2022
- Leiurus nigellus Abu Afifeh, Aloufi & Al-Saraireh 2023
- Leiurus nigerianus Lourenço, 2021
- Leiurus quinquestriatus (Ehrenberg, 1828) (type species)
- Leiurus saharicus Lourenço, 2020
- Leiurus savanicola Lourenço, Qi & Cloudsley-Thompson, 2006
- Leiurus somalicus Lourenço, & Rossi, 2016
- Leiurus hadb Al-Qahtni, Al-Salem, Alqahtani & Badry, 2023

== General characteristics ==
Members of Leiurus are generally moderately sized scorpions that show a typical buthid habitus with gracile pedipalp chelae and a slender metasoma. The vesicle is bulbous and proportionally large in some species. The cephalothorax and mesosoma shows distinct granulation. Characteristically the tergites of the mesosoma bear five distinct, longitudinal carinae (ridges). The base color is generally yellow with brown to blackish areas extending over various parts of the animal, depending on species.

=== Toxicity ===
The venom of L. quinquestriatus is among the most potent scorpion toxins. It severely affects the cardiac and pulmonary systems. Human fatalities, often children, have been confirmed by clinical reports. The median lethal dose of venom (LD_{50}) for this species was measured at 0.16 - 0.50 mg/kg_{mice}.
The toxicity of the other species is also potentially high to life-threatening, but reliable data are currently not available.

== Habitat ==
Most species live in semi-arid to arid regions, including the Sahara and Arabian deserts. At least one species occurs in savannah environment. Sparsely vegetated and sandy or rocky substrates are preferred. The scorpions live in shallow burrows in sand or beneath rocks.

== In captivity ==
Members of the genus Leiurus are often bred in captivity and traded. Due to their extreme toxicity, keeping these species is strictly recommended to only very experienced and/or professionally trained people.
