= BrMT =

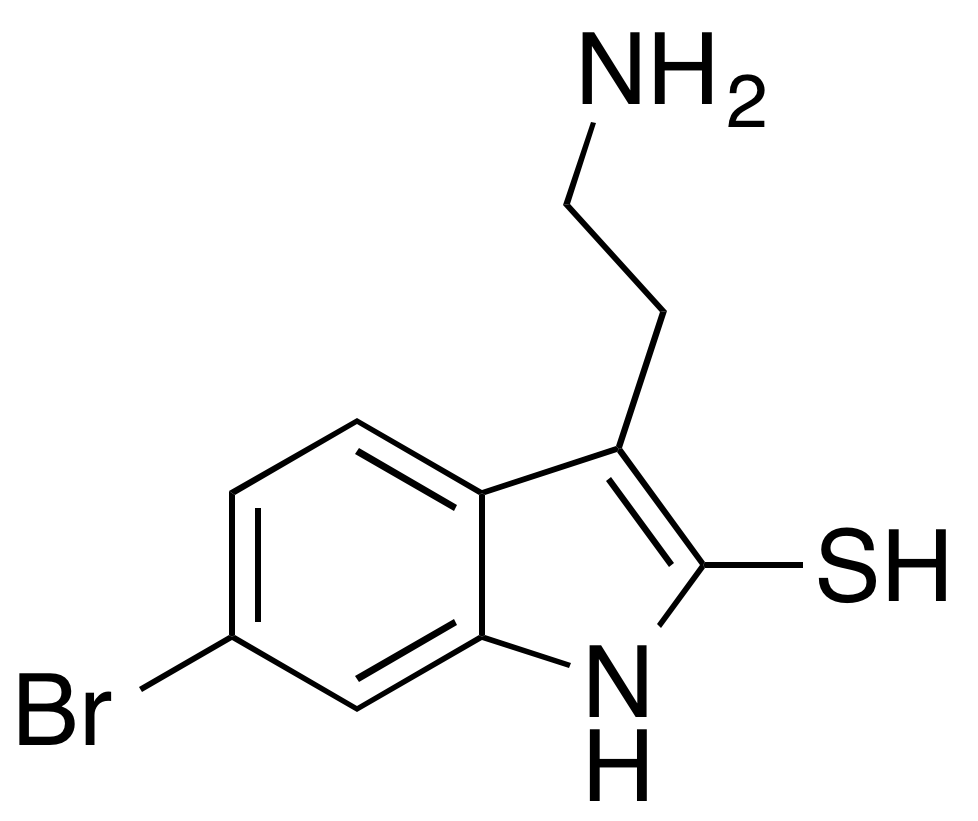

Names
- IUPAC name 3-(2-Aminoethyl)-6-bromo-1H-indole-2-thiol
- Other names 6-Bromo-2-mercaptotryptamine

Identifiers
CAS Number	808113-54-4
3D model (JSmol)	Interactive image
ChemSpider	29322191
PubChem CID	86014563
- InChI: InChI=1S/C10H11BrN2S/c11-6-1-2-7-8(3-4-12)10(14)13-9(7)5-6/h1-2,5,13-14H,3-4,12H2 Key: WEGSNHRPTPCHIZ-UHFFFAOYSA-N
- SMILES: BrC=1C=CC2=C(C1)NC(S)=C2CCN

Properties
Chemical formula	C_{10}H_{11}BrN_{2}S
Molar mass	271.18 g·mol^{−1}
- Except where otherwise noted, data are given for materials in their standard state (at 25 °C [77 °F], 100 kPa). Infobox references

BrMT (6-bromo-2-mercaptotryptamine) is a neurotoxin found in the hypobranchial gland of the marine snail species Calliostoma canaliculatum. The disulfide-linked dimer of BrMT possesses inhibitory effects on the K_{v}1 and K_{v}4 families of voltage-gated potassium channels.

== Source ==
BrMT was first isolated from the mucus of Calliostoma canaliculatum, a cone snail found in the temperate coastal waters of the western Pacific. BrMT is the first compound found in the hypobranchial gland mucus to produce a biological response.

== Chemistry ==
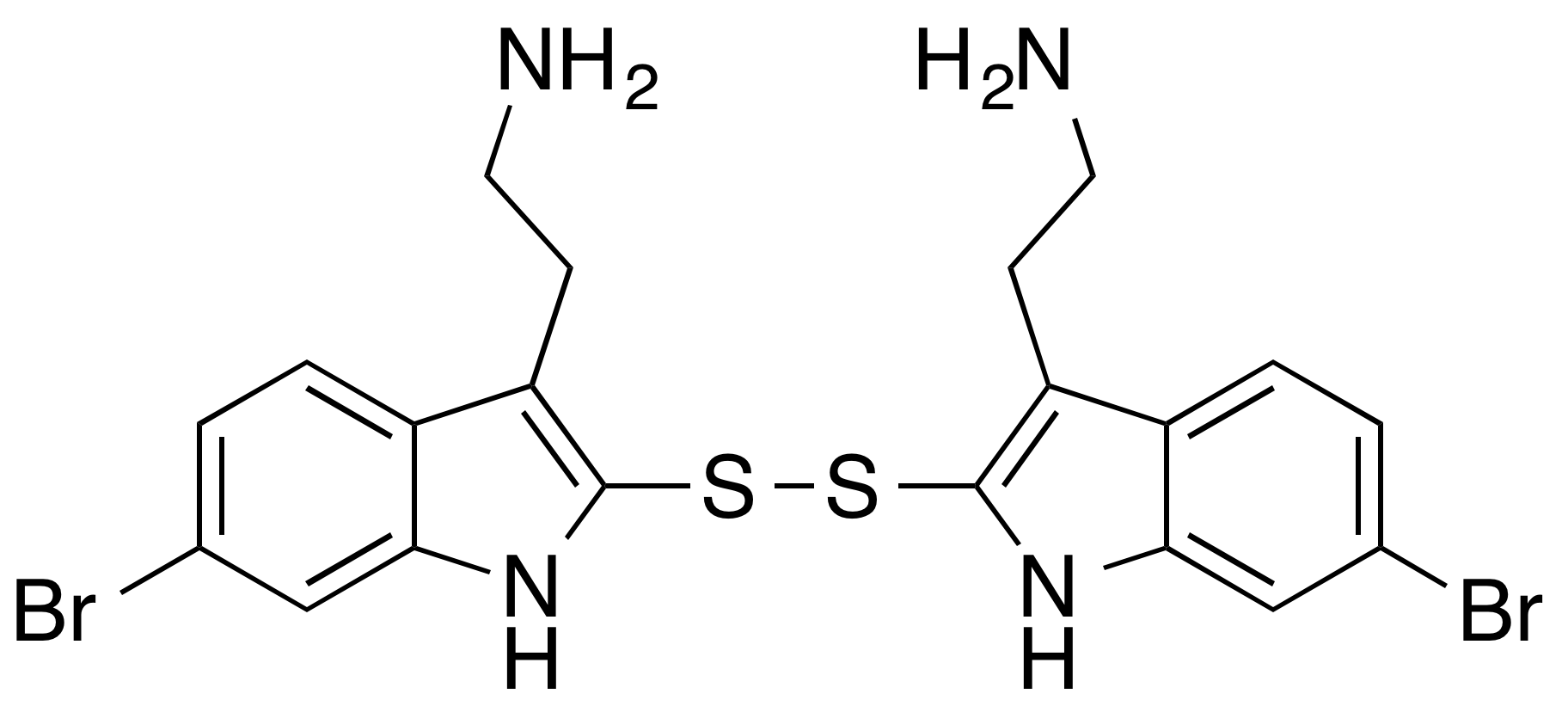
BrMT disulfide-linked dimer

BrMT is a brominated tryptamine. It has a thiol group, allowing dimerization via a disulfide linkage. BrMT is found to be light-sensitive and unstable in a reducing environment. Its first total synthesis was reported in 2013.

== Target ==
Calliostoma canaliculatum deters predators by covering its shells with BrMT-containing mucus, in particular when exposed to a predator, such as Pycnopodia helianthoides or Pisaster giganteus.

The BrMT dimer is known to affect voltage-gated potassium channels in the central nervous system. It strongly inhibits ShBΔ potassium channels, and to a lesser degree also isoforms found in humans (hK_{v}1.1) and squid (sqK_{v}1.A). It also affects members of K_{v}4 family (K_{v}4.1 and K_{v}4.2) and Drosophila ether-à-go-go channels.

== Mode of action ==
The mode of action of BrMT involves inhibition of specific voltage gated potassium channels present in the nervous system. By stabilizing the voltage sensor of the ion channel, the opening of ShBΔ ion channels and other K_{v}1 members is inhibited. BrMT has an IC_{50} of 1.1 ± 0.1 μM on ShBΔ channels, a member of the K_{v}1 family. The BrMT binding to ShBΔ has been found to be allosteric in nature, due to a change of conformation in the K^{+} channel subunits and not by blocking the entrance of the channel.
