= Imperatoxin =

Toxin

Imperatoxin I (IpTx) is a peptide toxin derived from the venom of the African scorpion Pandinus imperator.

There are two subtypes of this toxin:

- Imperatoxin A (activator): a peptide toxin which enhances the influx of Ca^{2+} from the sarcoplasmatic reticulum into the cell.
- Imperatoxin I (inhibitor): a peptide toxin which decreases the influx of Ca^{2+} from the sarcoplasmatic reticulum into the cell.

== Imperatoxin A ==
The toxin comes from the venom of the African scorpion Pandinus imperator. The structure of IpTx_{a} consists of:

- 33 amino acids peptide (sequence GDCLPHLKRCKADNDCCGKKCKRRGTNAEKRCR, disulfide bonds Cys3-Cys17, Cys10-Cys21, Cys16-Cys32).
- the formula is C_{148}H_{260}N_{58}O_{45}S_{6}.
- shares the structure and function of the dihydropiridine receptor (DHPR). It corresponds to the II-III loop of the α1s subunit.
- three cysteine residues that form disulfide bridges to stabilize the three-dimensional structure.

The molecular weight of the toxin is 3.7 kDa.

IpTx_{a} acts on the Ryanodine receptors (RyR), which are intracellular Ca^{2+} release channels mainly known for their role in regulating Ca^{2+} release from the sarcoplasmatic reticulum of striated muscles. The peptide acts better on RyR type 1 than on type 3. RyR type 2 seems to be insensitive to IpTx_{a}.

The part of the peptide that looks like the II-III loop of the (DHPR) binds directly to RyR and enhances ryanodine binding to trigger Ca^{2+} release.

== Imperatoxin I ==
The toxin comes from the venom of the African scorpion Pandinus imperator. The structure of IpTx_{i} consists of:

- Two polypeptides. A large subunit of 104 amino acids (sequence TMWGTKWCGSGNEATDISELGYWSNLDSCCRTHDHCDNIPSGQTKYGLTNEGKYTMMNCKCETAFEQCLRNVTGGMEGPAAGFVRKTYFDLYGNGCYNVQCPSQ) and a smaller one of 27 amino acids (sequence SEECPDGVATYTGEAGYGAWAINKLNG).
- Subunits are linked by a disulfide bond.
- Phospholipase A2 (PLA2) activity on the large subunit.

The molecular weight of the toxin is 15 kDa.

Like IpTx_{a}, IpTx_{i} acts on RyR.

When an action potential reaches the muscle, RyR channels open and Ca^{2+} becomes available in the cell to induce contraction. The presence of Ca^{2+} induces the large subunit of IpTx_{i} to hydrolyze the Sn2 fatty acyl bond from the membrane of the sarcoplasmatic reticulum. This process is executed by PLA2 activity. The freed fatty acids bind to the RyR itself or to a closely associated protein linked to gating. Binding of the RyR induces blocking of the channel. When the concentration of free fatty acids is low there will be an incomplete block of RyR; higher concentrations will give a complete block.

Because IpTx_{i} also works on the RyR channels of the heart muscles, it could potentially be used as a drug against arrhythmia. This has not yet been proven, and must be studied in vivo first.
