= Leiurus hebraeus =

Scientific classification
- Kingdom: Animalia
- Phylum: Arthropoda
- Subphylum: Chelicerata
- Class: Arachnida
- Order: Scorpiones
- Family: Buthidae
- Genus: Leiurus
- Species: L. hebraeus

Binomial name
- Leiurus hebraeus (Birula, 1908)

Synonyms
- Buthus quinquestriatus hebraeus Birula, 1908; Leiurus quinquestriatus hebraeus (Birula, 1908)

Species of scorpion

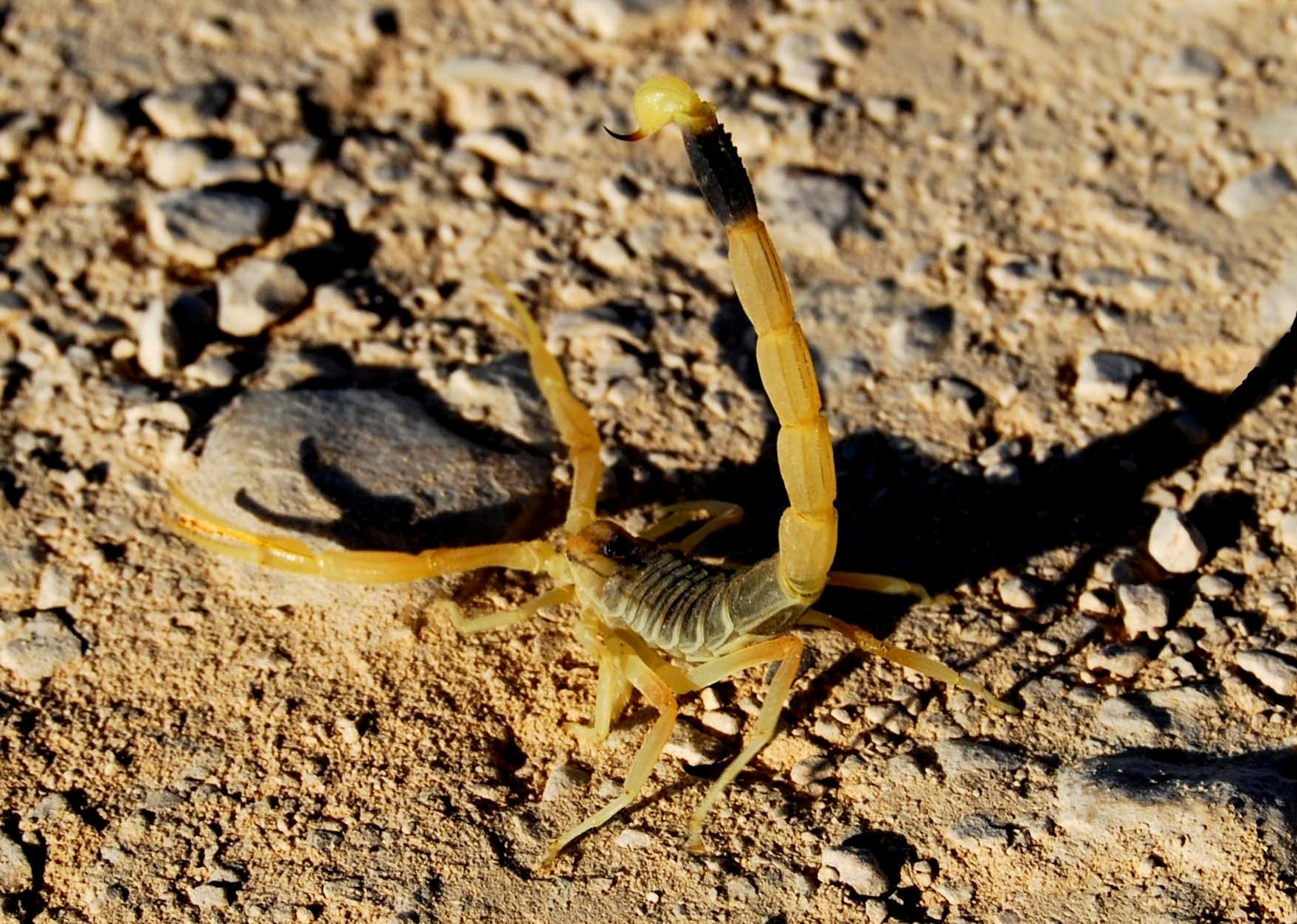
A deathstalker near Tzehelim, Israel

Leiurus hebraeus also known as the Hebrew deathstalker, is a species of scorpion, a member of the family Buthidae. It was once considered as a subspecies of Leiurus quinquestriatus but recently it was elevated to the rank of a species.

== Description ==
Leiurus hebraeus is yellow to orange-brown, and 58–77 millimetres (2.3–3.0 in) long.

== Geographic range ==
Leiurus hebraeus is known from Israel, Jordan, Lebanon and Syria.
