= Pandinotoxin =

Chemical compound

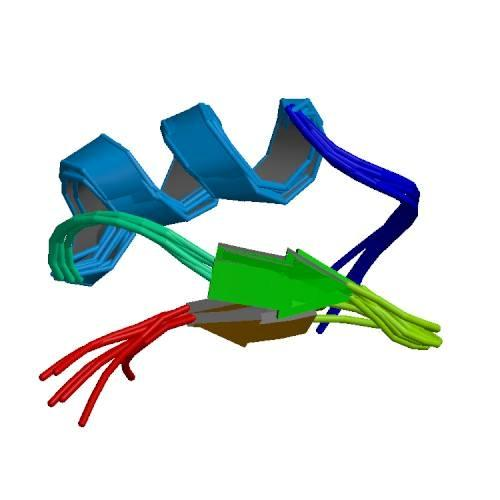
- Schematic diagram of the three-dimensional of Pandinotoxin

Identifiers
- Organism: Pandinus imperator
- Symbol: N/A

Pandinotoxins are toxins from the venom of the emperor scorpion Pandinus imperator. They are selective blockers of voltage-gated potassium channels

== Sources ==
The source for the pandinotoxins is the venom of the scorpion Pandinus imperator.

== Chemistry ==
=== Family ===
The toxins of the family are designated pandinotoxin (PiTX)-Kα, PiTX-Kβ, and PiTX-Kγ They are members of the α-KTx family of scorpion toxins.

=== Structure and homology ===
The sequences of Pandinotoxins

CTX

ZFTNVSCTTSKE-CWSVCQRLHNTSR-GKCMNKKCRCYS

PiTXK- α

---TISCTNPKQ-CYPHCKKETGYPN-AKCMNRKCKCFGR

PiTXK- β

---TISCTNEKQ-CYPHCKKETGYPN-AKCMNRKCKCFGR

PiTX-K γ

---LVKCRGTSD-CGRPCQQQTGCPN-SKCINRMCKCYGC

Figure 1: Sequence of Pandinotoxins. Adapted from Solution Structure for Pandinus Toxin K-R (PiTX-KR)

==== Pandinotoxin Kα and -β ====
The amino acid sequences of PiTX-K α and PiTX-K β are identical, except for the seventh amino acid: a proline in PiTX-Kα and a glutamic acid in PiTX-Kβ (see Fig.1).

PiTX-Kα and PiTX-Kβ are 35-residue peptides, which are found to have an α-helix from residues 10 to 21 and two β-sheets (β 1 is from residues 26-28, β 2 is from residues 33-35). One face of the α-helix is anchored to the β-sheet by three disulfide bonds which are conserved in all members of the charybdotoxin family (R-K toxins). PiTX-K α and PiTX-K β have only two β-sheets whereas other members of the family have three additional amino acid residues at the N-terminal portion, which forms a third β-sheet.

==== Pandinotoxin Kγ ====
Pandinotoxin Kγ has not yet been investigated.

== Target ==
Pandinotoxins are the most potent inhibitors of the rapidly inactivating A-type voltage-gated potassium channels. They also block the delayed rectifier, slowly inactivating channels of the subfamily A member 2 (Kv1.2/KCNA2) [1] and they can reversibly block the shaker B potassium-channels (Kv1.1 sub-family).

== Mode of action ==
The residue K27, a lysine at place 27 of the protein sequence, interacts with the voltage sensitivity blocking activity of CTX channels. It is conserved among PiTX-K α and PiTX-K β. This amino acid is located nearby the selectivity filter of the pore and it is responsible for the interaction with A-type channels by being inserted in the pore of the ion channels. The structural differences in the backbone and side chain between PiTX-Kα and CTX result in a higher affinity for A-type channels for PiTX-Kα. The affinity for the Shaker B K^{+} channel is significantly smaller for PiTX-Kβ in comparison with PiTX-Kα owing to the changes in the seventh residue.

== Therapeutic use ==
Intraplantarly injection of PiTX-Kα before or after the administration of diclofenac produces a significant reduction in spontaneous flinching, mechanical allodynia and thermal hyperalgesia in a rat model for bone cancer. Downregulation of PiTX-Kα almost completely eliminates diclofenac-induced anti-nociception.
