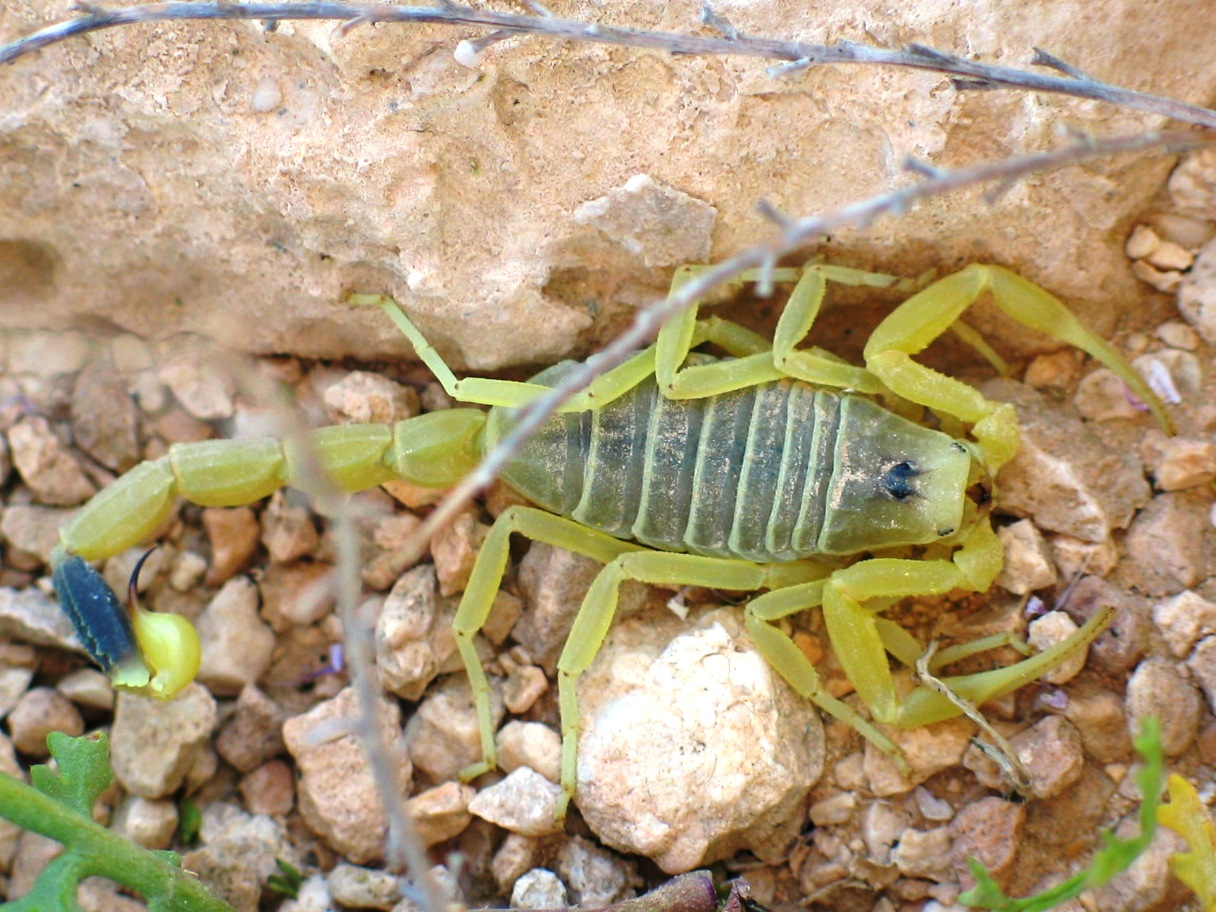

Scientific classification
- Kingdom: Animalia
- Phylum: Arthropoda
- Subphylum: Chelicerata
- Class: Arachnida
- Order: Scorpiones
- Family: Buthidae
- Genus: Leiurus
- Species: L. quinquestriatus

Binomial name
- Leiurus quinquestriatus Hemprich & Ehrenberg, 1829

= Deathstalker =

Species of arachnid

The deathstalker (Leiurus quinquestriatus) is a species of scorpion, a member of the family Buthidae. It is also known as the Palestine yellow scorpion, Omdurman scorpion, and Naqab desert scorpion, as well as by many other colloquial names, which generally originate from the commercial captive trade of the animal. To eliminate confusion, especially important with potentially dangerous species, the scientific name is normally used to refer to them. The name Leiurus quinquestriatus roughly translates into English as "five-striped smooth-tail". In 2014, the subspecies L. q. hebraeus was separated from it and elevated to its own species Leiurus hebraeus. Other species of the genus Leiurus are also often referred to as "deathstalkers". Leiurus quinquestriatus is yellow, and 30–77 millimetres (1.2–3.0 in) long, with an average of 58 mm (2.3 in).

== Distribution and habitat ==
Leiurus quinquestriatus can be found in desert and scrubland habitats ranging from North Africa through to the Middle East. Its range covers a wide sweep of territory in the Sahara, Arabian Desert, Thar Desert, and Central Asia, from Algeria and Mali in the west through to Egypt, Ethiopia, Asia Minor and the Arabian Peninsula, eastwards to Kazakhstan and western India in the northeast and southeast.

== Venom ==
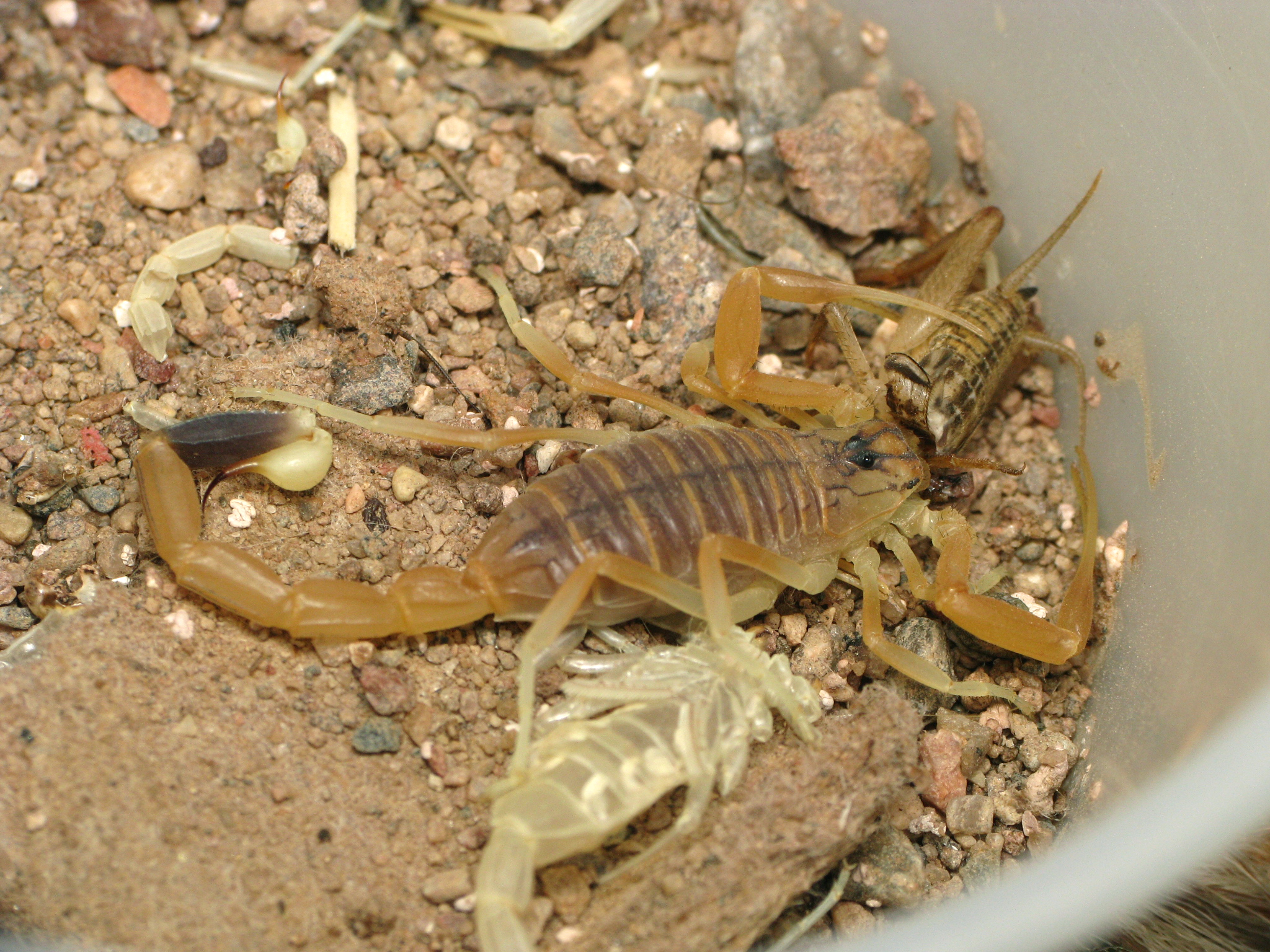
A deathstalker eating a cricket in captivity

Neurotoxins in L. quinquestriatus venom include:

- Chlorotoxin
- Charybdotoxin, a blocker of calcium-activated potassium channels.
- Scyllatoxin
- Agitoxins types one, two and three

Other components :

- Lq2, which gets its name from this scorpion.

=== Hazards ===
The deathstalker is one of the most dangerous species of scorpion. Its venom is a powerful mixture of neurotoxins, with a low lethal dose. While a sting from this scorpion is extraordinarily painful, it normally would not kill a healthy adult human. However, young children, the elderly, or infirm (such as those with a heart condition and those who are allergic) are at much greater risk. Any envenomation runs the risk of anaphylaxis, a potentially life-threatening allergic reaction to the venom. A study from Israel shows a high rate of pancreatitis following envenomation. If a sting from Leiurus quinquestriatus does prove deadly, the cause of death is usually pulmonary edema.

Antivenom for the treatment of deathstalker envenomations is produced by pharmaceutical companies AbbVie and Sanofi Pasteur, and by the National Antivenom and Vaccine Production Center in Riyadh. Envenomation by the deathstalker is considered a medical emergency even with antivenom treatment, as its venom is unusually resistant to treatment and typically requires large doses of antivenom.

In the United States and other countries outside of the typical range of the deathstalker, there is the additional complicating factor that none of the existing antivenoms are approved by the Food and Drug Administration (or equivalent agencies) and are only available as investigational drugs. The US Armed Forces maintain an investigational drug application for the AVPC-Riyadh antivenom in the event of envenomation of soldiers in the Gulf War theater of operations, and the Florida Antivenin Bank, managed by the Miami-Dade Fire Rescue Department, maintains Sanofi Pasteur's Scorpifav antivenom for the deathstalker.

=== Uses ===
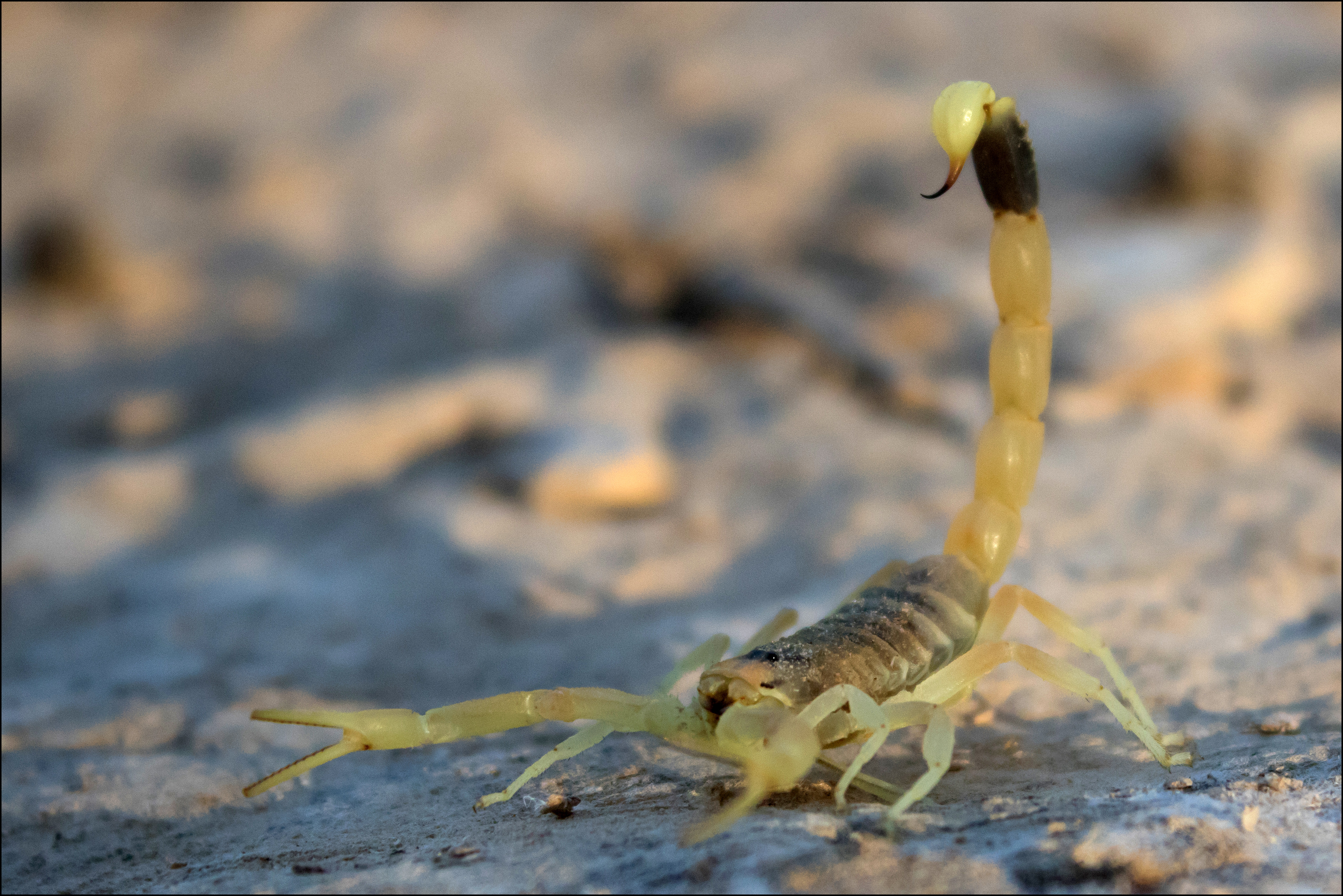
Deathstalker in Negev Desert, Israel

A component of the deathstalker's venom, the peptide chlorotoxin, has shown potential for treating human brain tumors. There has also been some evidence to show that other components of the venom may aid in the regulation of insulin and could be used to treat diabetes.

In 2015 clinical trials were beginning of the use of chlorotoxin with a fluorescent molecule attached as brain tumour "paint" (BLZ-100), to mark cancerous cells in real time during an operation. This is important in brain cancer surgery, where it is vital both to remove as many cancerous cells as possible, but not to remove healthy tissue necessary for brain functioning. In preclinical animal trials the technique could highlight extremely small clusters of as few as 200 cancer cells, compared to the standard use of MRI, with a lower limit in excess of 500,000.

== Legality ==
Possession of L. quinquestriatus may be illegal or regulated in countries with laws prohibiting the keeping of dangerous animals in general. Jurisdictions are increasingly and explicitly including L. quinquestriatus in laws requiring permits to keep animals which are not usual pets, or restricting possession of dangerous animals, and in some cases have prohibited the keeping of L. quinquestriatus save by licensed zoos and educational facilities.

In several jurisdictions departments of fish and wildlife require permits for many animals, and a number of cities and municipal governments have prohibited their possession in their bylaws.
