= Charybdotoxin =

Chemical compound, scorpion neurotoxin

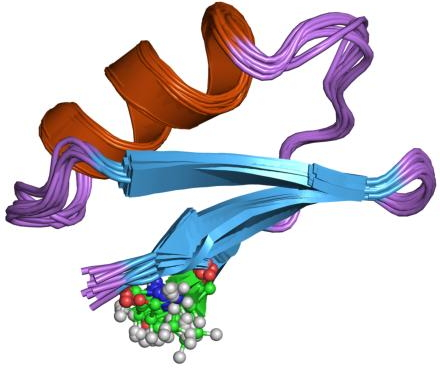
- Refined model of Charybdotoxin. PDB 2crd.

Identifiers
- Organism: Leiurus quinquestriatus hebraeus
- Symbol: ChTX
- Alt. symbols: ChTX-Lq1, ChTx-a
- CAS number: 95751-30-7
- PDB: 2crd More structures
- UniProt: P13487
Search for
- Structures: Swiss-model
- Domains: InterPro

Charybdotoxin (ChTX) is a 37 amino acid neurotoxin from the venom of the scorpion Leiurus quinquestriatus hebraeus (deathstalker) that blocks calcium-activated potassium channels. This blockade causes hyperexcitability of the nervous system. It is a close homologue of agitoxin and both toxins come from Leiurus quinquestriatus hebraeus. It is named after Charybdis, a sea monster from Greek myth.

== Chemical properties ==
=== Family ===
The Charybdotoxin family of scorpion toxins is a group of small peptides that has many family members, such as the pandinotoxin, derived from the venom of scorpion Pandinus imperator.

=== Structure ===
Scorpions such as the deathstalker paralyze their prey by injecting a potent mix of peptide toxins. Charybdotoxin, a 37 amino acid, 4 kDa neurotoxin with the molecular formula C_{176}H_{277}N_{57}O_{55}S_{7}, is one of the peptide toxins that can be extracted from the venom of the scorpion. Its structure is very similar to that of margatoxin. Charybdotoxin contains three disulfide bridges.

== Mode of action ==
Charybdotoxin occludes the pore of calcium-activated voltage-gated shaker K^{+} channels by binding to one of four independent, overlapping binding sites. It binds both to the open and the closed states. In addition, the block is enhanced as the ionic strength is lowered. This block occurs as the Asn ^{30} on the CTX interacts with the Asp ^{381} on the K+ channel. The blockade of K^{+} channels by the charybdotoxin peptide causes neuronal hyperexcitability. Mutations of the Lys31Gln and the Asn30Gln had the effect of lessening the CTX block of the pore on the shaker channel.

== Treatment ==
Anti-scorpion venom serum (AScVS) is an effective and safe method of therapy in severe scorpion envenoming syndrome. Compared with other therapies like alpha blockers it has a relatively short recovery period (10 vs 16–42 hours).
