= Shaker (gene) =

Gene found in fruit flies

Identifiers
- Organism: Drosophila melanogaster
- Symbol: Sh
- Entrez: 32780
- Orthologs: NCBI: entry; OMA: entry
- RefSeq (mRNA): NM_167596
- UniProt: P08510

Other data
- Chromosome: X: 17.8 - 17.98 Mb
Search for
- Structures: Swiss-model
- Domains: InterPro

potassium voltage-gated channel, shaker-related subfamily, member 3

Identifiers
- Symbol: KCNA3
- NCBI gene: 3738
- HGNC: 6221
- OMIM: 176263
- RefSeq: NM_002232
- UniProt: P22001

Other data
- Locus: Chr. 1 p13.3
Search for
- Structures: Swiss-model
- Domains: InterPro

The shaker (Sh) gene, when mutated, causes a variety of atypical behaviors in the fruit fly, Drosophila melanogaster. Under ether anesthesia, the fly’s legs will shake (hence the name); even when the fly is unanaesthetized, it will exhibit aberrant movements. Sh-mutant flies have a shorter lifespan than regular flies; in their larvae, the repetitive firing of action potentials as well as prolonged exposure to neurotransmitters at neuromuscular junctions occurs.

In Drosophila, the shaker gene is located on the X chromosome. The closest human homolog is KCNA3.

== Function ==
The Sh gene plays a part in the operation of potassium ion channels, which are integral membrane proteins and are essential to the correct functioning of the cell. A working shaker channel is voltage-dependent and has four subunits, which form a pore through which ions flow, carrying type-A potassium current (IA). A mutation in the Sh gene reduces the conductance of charge across the neuron since the channels do not work, causing the severe phenotypical aberrations mentioned above. These types of ion channels are responsible for the repolarization of the cell.

The shaker K channel is a homo tetrameric protein complex. When confronted with a stimulus, the tetramers undergo conformational changes; some of these changes are cooperative. The final step involved in the opening of the channel is highly synchronized.

The shaker gene has also been identified as a gene that helps determine an organism's amount of sleep. The phenotype of the flies that need less sleep is called minisleep (mns).

== Blockers ==
The shaker K channel is affected by various toxins, which effectively slow the opening of the channel, or reversibly block its functioning.

Toxins that affect the shaker K channel include:

- Agitoxin
- Charybdotoxin
- Iberiotoxin
- Pandinotoxin
- 6-bromo-2-mercaptotryptamine (BrMT)

BrMT can be seen working in the K channel to prevent the early activation of the channel – before the cooperation has begun. Though its exact mechanism remains unknown, it is expected to work by forcing a conformational change in the pore domain of the channel. This part of the channel is expected to be altered instead of the voltage-sensing domain because of its connections to other subunits. When the conformational change is enacted, the BrMT sites on adjacent subunits are also affected, resulting in a widespread delayed activation of the K channel.

== See also ==
- Genetically encoded voltage indicator
