= Neobuthus amoudensis =

Scientific classification
- Kingdom: Animalia
- Phylum: Arthropoda
- Subphylum: Chelicerata
- Class: Arachnida
- Order: Scorpiones
- Family: Buthidae
- Genus: Neobuthus
- Species: N. amoudensis

Binomial name
- Neobuthus amoudensis Kovařík, Lowe, Awale, Elmi, & Hurre, 2018

Species of scorpion

Neobuthus amoudensis is a species of scorpion from the family Buthidae found in Somaliland and Ethiopia. It is named in honor of the Amoud University.

== Taxonomy ==
Male specimens of N. amoudensis were collected and temporarily categorized as Neobuthus ferrugineus in 2012. They were defined as a separate species once a larger number of samples could be collected between 2016–2018.

== Description ==
The males measure 18–20 mm in length, while females measure 23.5–25.7 mm. The pedipalps are relatively slender. The body's base colour is of a pale yellow to a light orange, with variable fuscous pigmentation and patterns of dark maculation on the pedipalps, metasoma and partially on its legs. The scorpion's teeth are reddish, and the chelicerae are yellow.

== Distribution ==
N. amoudensis can be found in Ethiopia and Somaliland, on rocky areas of semi-desert, occasionally near or in dry river beds. The species' type location is in a seasonal river's bed on the grounds of the Amoud University in Somaliland. The localities of Neobuthus amoudensis are near to the localities of Neobuthus gubanensis and Neobuthus factorio.
