= Afrolychas braueri =

Seychelles forest scorpion

Conservation status
- Critically Endangered (IUCN 3.1)

Scientific classification
- Domain: Eukaryota
- Kingdom: Animalia
- Phylum: Arthropoda
- Subphylum: Chelicerata
- Class: Arachnida
- Order: Scorpiones
- Family: Buthidae
- Genus: Afrolychas
- Species: A. braueri

Binomial name
- Afrolychas braueri (Kraepelin, 1896)
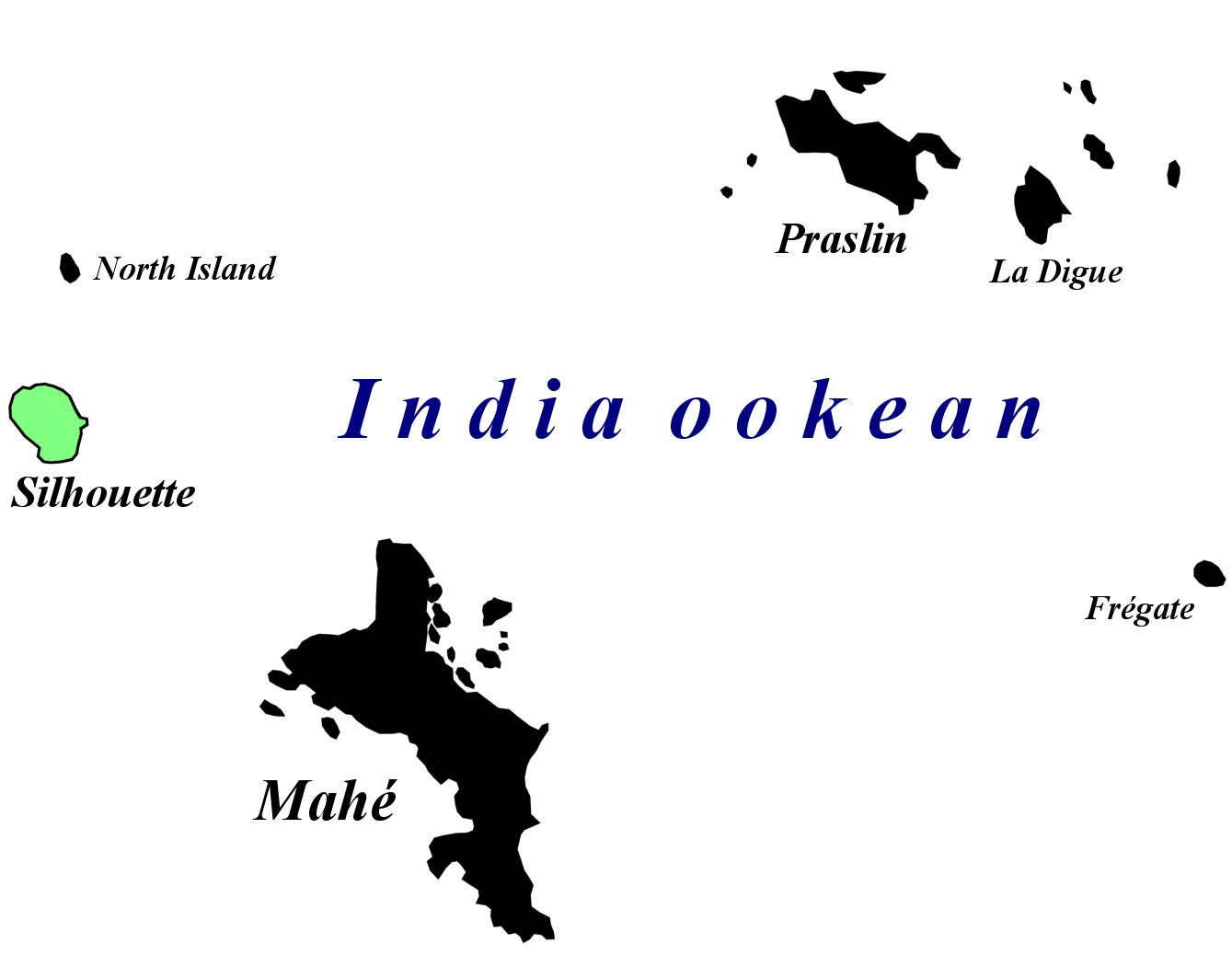
- Silhouette Island and the neighboring islands

Synonyms
- Archisometrus braueri (Kraepelin, 1896); Lychas braueri (Lamoral and Reynders, 1975)

Species of scorpion from the Seychelles

Afrolychas braueri, commonly known as the Seychelles forest scorpion, is a species of scorpion in the family Buthidae. It is currently thought to survive only on Silhouette Island, Seychelles, although the species was historically found on two additional Seychellois islands. This scorpion lives in leaf litter in forests that are largely unaffected by invasive plant species. It is a small yellowish-brown scorpion with three prominent keels on the dorsal surface of its mesosoma, which distinguishes it from other scorpions. While not much is known about the Seychelles forest scorpion's ecology due to the paucity of sightings, it is known to rely solely on its venom to capture its prey and defend its young. Its venom is not dangerous to humans.

The Seychelles forest scorpion has only been observed a handful of times and as such is believed to live in very low population densities. It is listed as a critically endangered species by the International Union for Conservation of Nature and is one of the most endangered scorpion species in the world. It is thought to be primarily threatened by invasive plant species, particularly Cinnamomum verum, degrading its habitat. Its entire known range is protected by Silhouette National Park, and recent conservation efforts on the island include vegetation restoration and the removal of cinnamon.

== Taxonomy ==
The Seychelles forest scorpion was originally described in 1896 by Karl Kraepelin as Archisometrus braueri. In 1913, it was moved to the genus Lychas by Arthur Stanley Hirst. Lychas, a primarily Asian genus, was largely regarded as polyphyletic and it was long suspected that this scorpion may belong to a different genus. In 2019, the species was split into the new genus Afrolychas along with Afrolychas burdoi, a mainland African species believed to be its closest relative, by František Kovařík. The genus name Afrolychas is a reference to the African range of its species and to the fact that the two species used to be members of the genus Lychas. The specific name braueri is in honor of August Brauer, a German zoologist who conducted scientific surveys in the Seychelles and who collected the initial specimens.

The type specimen was collected from Praslin Island by August Brauer in 1894 and is held at the Zoological Institute and Museum of the University of Hamburg. The species was next found in "high jungle" on Mahé and on Silhouette in 1905 by the Percy Sladen Memorial Expedition. After these initial collections, it was not seen again until being rediscovered in 1990 in Silhouette's Jardin Marron.

== Description ==
The Seychelles forest scorpion is a small, yellowish-brown scorpion measuring 25 to 36 mm (0.98 to 1.42 in) in length. It is best distinguished from similar scorpions by having three conspicuous keels on its mesosoma's dorsal surface. Additionally, on both the movable and fixed fingers of the scorpion's pedipalps, or pincers, the sixth cutting edge lacks external and internal granules. Overall this scorpion is a blotched yellowish-brown in coloration with a smooth and glossy fifth metasomal segment and a notably long telson, or stinger. Its pectens have 14–18 pectinal teeth. Adults are not noticeably sexually dimorphic. Its sting is not considered dangerous for humans.

== Distribution and habitat ==
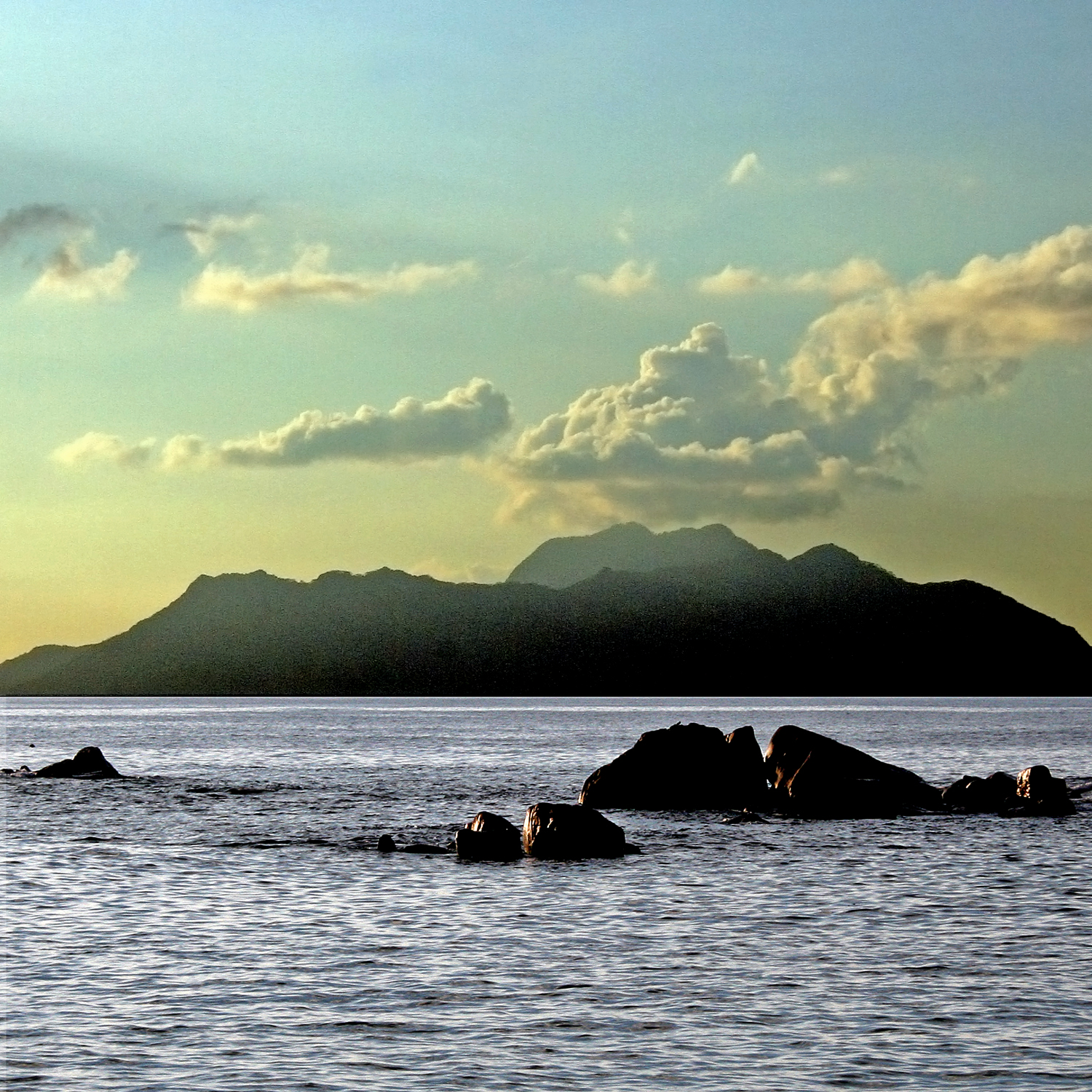
Silhouette Island as viewed from Mahé

Afrolychas braueri is currently only known from a 5 km^{2} (1,200 acres) wooded portion of Silhouette Island in the Seychelles. It is one of only three species of scorpion found in the Seychelles. It is only found in the higher elevations of this island between 500 and 550 m (1,640 and 1,800 ft). Historically this scorpion was endemic to the broader Seychelles, and was found on Mahé before invasive plants drove it to local extinction. The Seychelles forest scorpion is found at very low population densities.

The Seychelles forest scorpion lives in the leaf litter of forests that are largely unaffected by invasive plant species and therefore maintain their natural flora, such as Dillenia ferruginea. They shelter under stones and logs.

== Ecology and behavior ==
The invasive ant species Technomyrmex albipes is known to have killed Seychelles forest scorpions. Like all buthid scorpions, the Seychelles forest scorpion relies solely on its venom to capture its prey. In June 2009, a female was discovered carrying seven young scorpions on her back, which she, like other scorpions, would care for until they were able to survive on their own.

== Conservation ==
The Seychelles forest scorpion was assessed as a critically endangered species by the International Union for Conservation of Nature in 2012. It is currently known only from a small area of woodland on Silhouette Island that is being degraded by invasive plant species, notably Cinnamomum verum. It is thought that this scorpion went extinct on the islands of Mahé and Praslin after 1909 due to invasive plants taking over its habitat. It may also be threatened by an invasive ant species. As of 2009, since 1909, the species has only been observed three times, in 1990, 2006, and 2009, all on Silhouette Island. Its limited range is evident as several surveys have failed to locate the arachnid. While the entire known population of the species is protected within Silhouette National Park, as of 2012 the park was not being managed to protect the scorpion. However, since then the Island Conservation Society's Silhouette Island Conservation Centre has begun to implement conservation projects on the island, including vegetation restoration and the removal of cinnamon.
