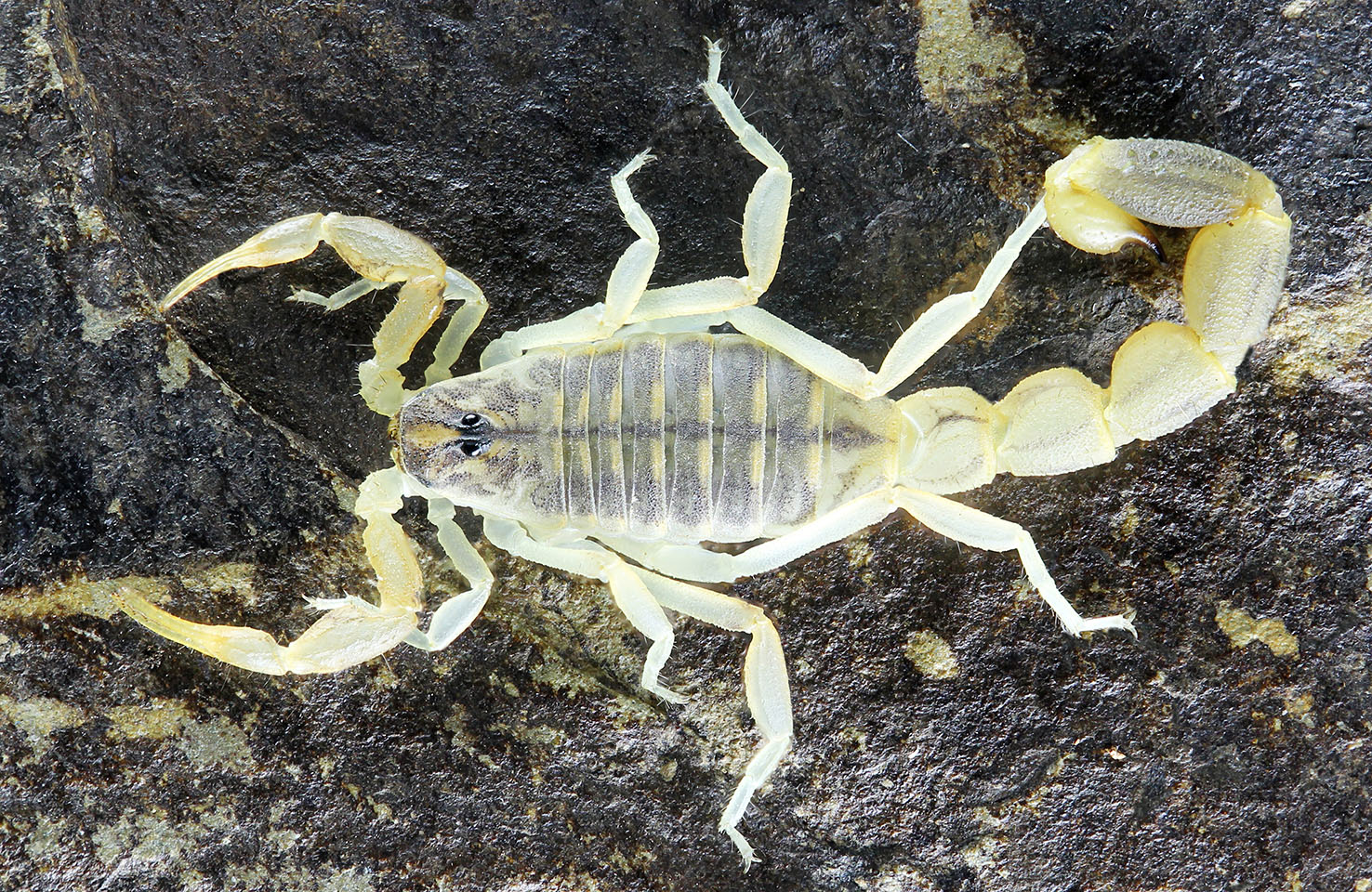
- Male specimen of Neobuthus erigavoensis

Scientific classification
- Kingdom: Animalia
- Phylum: Arthropoda
- Subphylum: Chelicerata
- Class: Arachnida
- Order: Scorpiones
- Family: Buthidae
- Genus: Neobuthus
- Species: N. erigavoensis

Binomial name
- Neobuthus erigavoensis Kovařík, Lowe, Awale, Elmi, & Hurre, 2018

= Neobuthus erigavoensis =

Species of scorpion

Neobuthus erigavoensis is a species of scorpion from the family Buthidae found in Somaliland.

== Taxonomy ==
Specimens of N. erigavoensis may have been collected and temporarily categorized as Neobuthus ferrugineus since 2012. They were defined as a separate species once a larger number of samples could be collected between 2016–2018. The species was named after its type location, which is near Erigavo city.

== Description ==
Males have an average of 20–25 mm in length, while females have 21–25.5 mm. The pedipalps are relatively slender, of yellow colour, with a matte, finely granulated texture in males, and smooth and glossy on females. The body's base colour is of a pale yellow, and female pedipalps don't exhibit dark spots. The dorsal metasomal carinae is missing in females, a characteristic present only in this species and in Neobuthus montanus.

== Distribution ==
N. erigavoensis can be found in Somalia, on rocky areas of semi-desert. Its type location is the outskirts of the village of Buq, near Erigavo, in the Sanaag region. The localities of Neobuthus erigavoensis are near to the localities of Neobuthus montanus.
