= OSK3 =

OSK3, from the venom of the scorpion Orthochirus scrobiculosus, is a potassium channel blocker that belongs to the α-KTx8 subfamily and targets the voltage-gated potassium channels KCNA2 (K_{v}1.2), and KCNA3 (K_{v}1.3).

OSK3

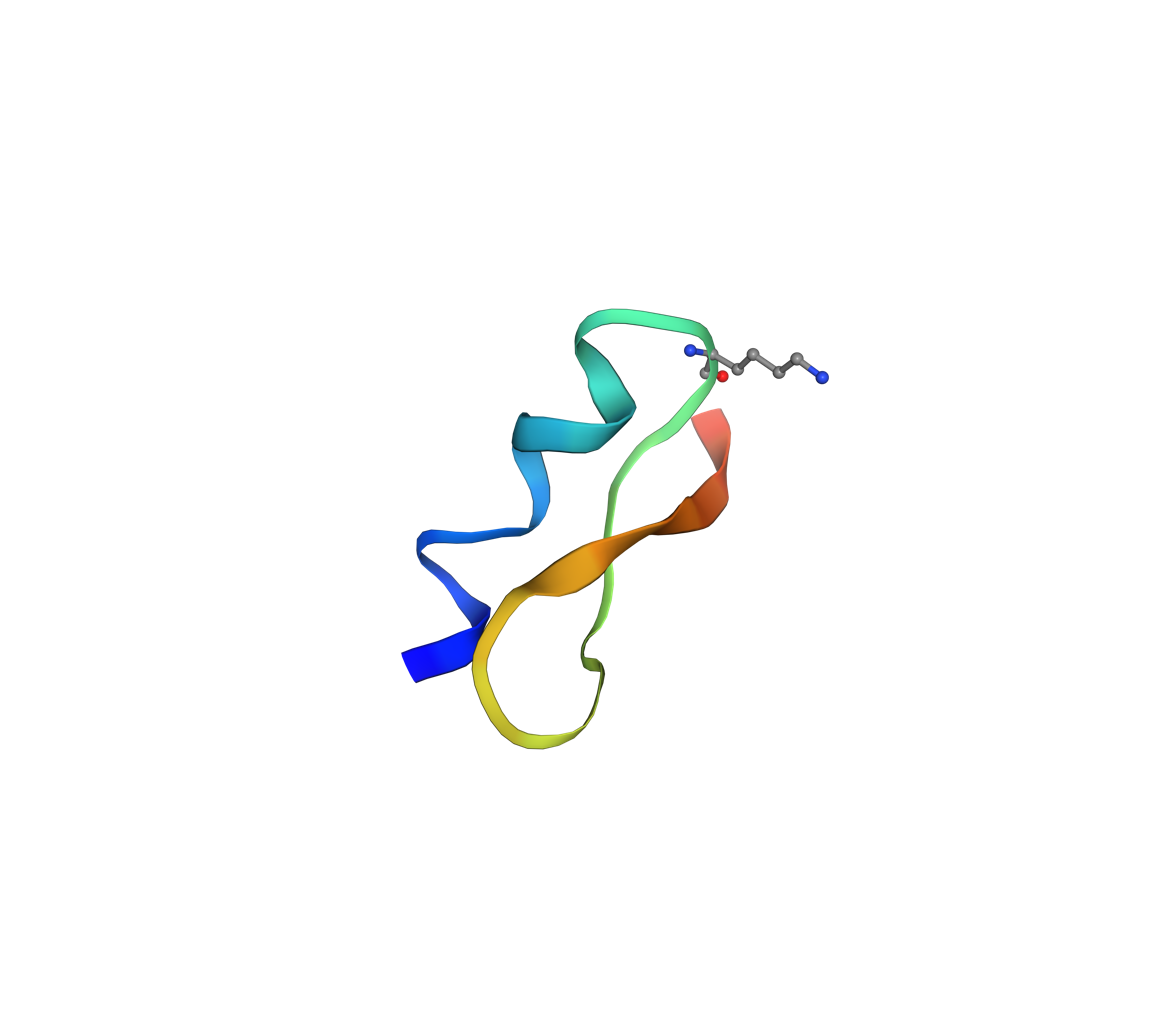
The protein structure of OSK3

Identifiers
Superfamily: Short scorpion toxin
Family: Potassium channel inhibitor
Subfamily: Alpha-KTx 08
Uniprot: A0A1L2FZD4
Species: Orthochirus scrobiculosus

== Etymology and source ==
OSK3 is secreted from the venom gland of Orthochirus scrobiculosus, which is also known as the Central Asian scorpion and belongs to the Buthoidea superfamily, the largest scorpion superfamily. The toxin gets its name from the acronym of the species it originates from, the type of ion channel it blocks, and the order of its discovery within the toxin family.

== Chemistry ==
=== Structure ===
The propeptide of OSK3 is a small polypeptide consisting of 57 amino acids, with a mean molecular mass of 6386 Da. It is then further spliced into a mature form consisting of 29 amino acid residues, among which 6 are cysteine residues that make up 3 intracellular disulfide bonds. The mean mass of the OSK3 toxin is 3206.3 ± 0.2 Da.

Sequence of OSK3 propeptide:

MCRLYAIILI VLVMNVIMTI IPDSKVEVVS CEDCPEHCST QKARAKCDND KCVCEPI

=== Family ===
OSK3 (α-KTx 8.8) belongs to the α-KTx family, which is a scorpion venom toxin family blocking potassium channels. It is the most abundant and shows the highest diversity among the six KTx families (α-,β-,γ-,δ-,κ-, and λ-KTx). Additionally, OSK3 is the eighth member of the α-KTx8 subfamily. The preceding members are AmP01 (α-KTx 8.1), BmP01 (α-KTx 8.2), LpII (α-KTx 8.3), LPIII (α-KTx 8.4), OdK1 (α-KTx 8.5), MeuKTx-1 (α-KTx 8.6), and MeKTx1-2 (α-KTx 8.7).

=== Homology ===
All members of the α-KTx8 subfamily consist of 29 amino acid residues. 97% of the residues in OSK3 are identical with AmP01 (α-KTx8.1) which originates from the scorpion Androctonus mauretanicus mauretanicus, with only one differing amino acid residue. OSK3 differs from OdK1, α-KTx8.5, with only two C-terminal residues. Due to this structural difference, specific interactions of the residues with the type of voltage gated potassium channels also vary; OdK1 targets K_{v}1.2 whereas OSK3 inhibits both K_{v}1.2 and K_{v}1.3 channels.

== Target ==
OSK3 displays a novel selectivity profile as compared to the rest of the α-KTx8 subfamily, targeting selectively the voltage-gated potassium channels K_{v}1.2 and K_{v}1.3. At 1 μM, it blocks K_{v}1.2 channels completely and K_{v}1.3 channels by 88 ± 4%. At the same concentration, OSK3 also inhibits K_{v}1.6 by 11 ± 3%. The IC50 values for K_{v}1.2, K_{v}1.3 and K_{v}1.6 are 331 ± 17 nM, 503 ± 31nM, and 9983 ± 172 nM respectively. Higher activity levels on the aforementioned channels has been observed in other well-studied toxins, however this activity level is typical for members of the subfamily such as AmP01 (α-KTx 8.1) and OdK1 (α-KTx 8.5).

== Mode of action ==
OSK3 selectively blocks K_{v}1.2 and K_{v}1.3. The underlying mechanism for the high affinity of OSK3 for these channels depends on the non-specific hydrophobic interactions between the C-terminal residues of OSK3 and the channel proteins, contrary to many other highly selective ligand-receptor complexes which mostly depend on specific contacts such as hydrogen bonds and salt bridges. It is suggested that toxins of the α-KTx8 family specifically bind to the potassium channel vestibule.
