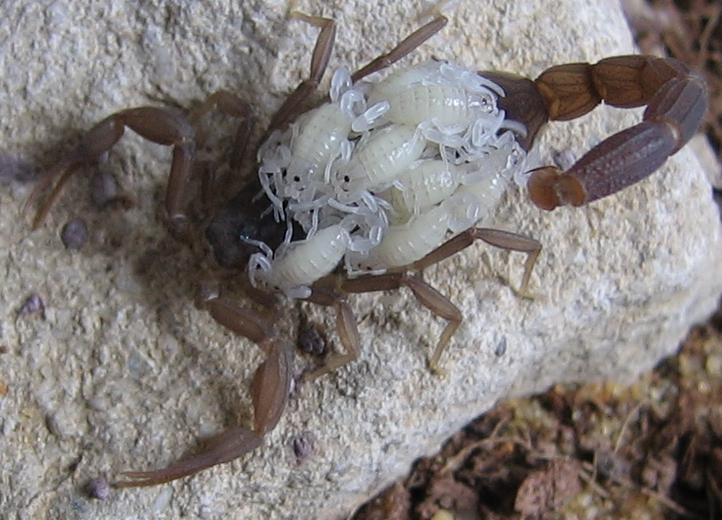
- Female with young

Scientific classification
- Domain: Eukaryota
- Kingdom: Animalia
- Phylum: Arthropoda
- Subphylum: Chelicerata
- Class: Arachnida
- Order: Scorpiones
- Family: Buthidae
- Genus: Compsobuthus
- Species: C. werneri

Binomial name
- Compsobuthus werneri (Birula, 1908)

= Compsobuthus werneri =

Species of scorpion

Compsobuthus werneri is a species of scorpion in the family Buthidae.
