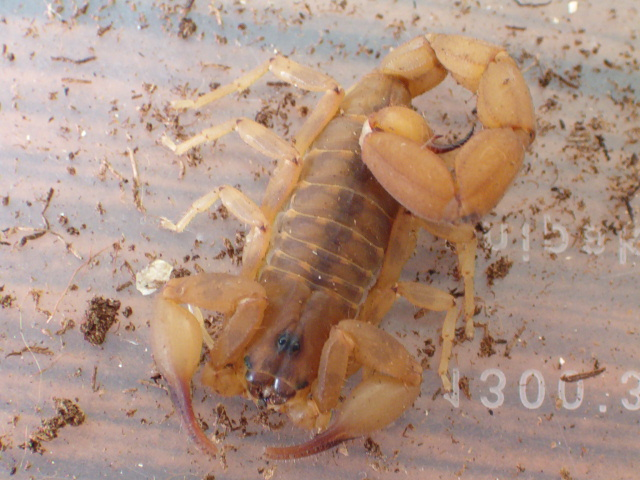
- Odonturus dentatus

Scientific classification
- Kingdom: Animalia
- Phylum: Arthropoda
- Subphylum: Chelicerata
- Class: Arachnida
- Order: Scorpiones
- Parvorder: Buthida; Soleglad and Fet, 2003
- Superfamily: Buthoidea; C. L. Koch, 1837

Families
- †Archaeobuthidae; Buthidae; Microcharmidae; †Palaeoburmesebuthidae; †Protobuthidae

= Buthoidea =

Buthoidea Temporal range: Anisian to recent

Superfamily of scorpions

Buthoidea is the largest superfamily of scorpions. Its members are known as fat-tailed scorpions and bark scorpions. A few very large genera (Ananteris, Centruroides, Compsobuthus, or Tityus) are known, but a high number of species-poor or monotypic ones also exist. They occur in the warmer parts of every major landmass on Earth, except on New Zealand. The superfamily was established by Carl Ludwig Koch in 1837.

== Taxonomy ==
Five families are placed into Buthoidea, two extant families Buthidae and Microcharmidae, plus three extinct families.

- †Archaeobuthidae (Lebanese amber, Hauterivian)
- Buthidae (Modern, Cenomanian - Recent)
- Microcharmidae (Modern, Recent)
- †Palaeoburmesebuthidae (Burmese amber, Cenomanian)
- †Protobuthidae ( Grès à Voltzia Formation, Anisian)
- †Sucinlourencoidae (Burmese amber, Cenomanian)
