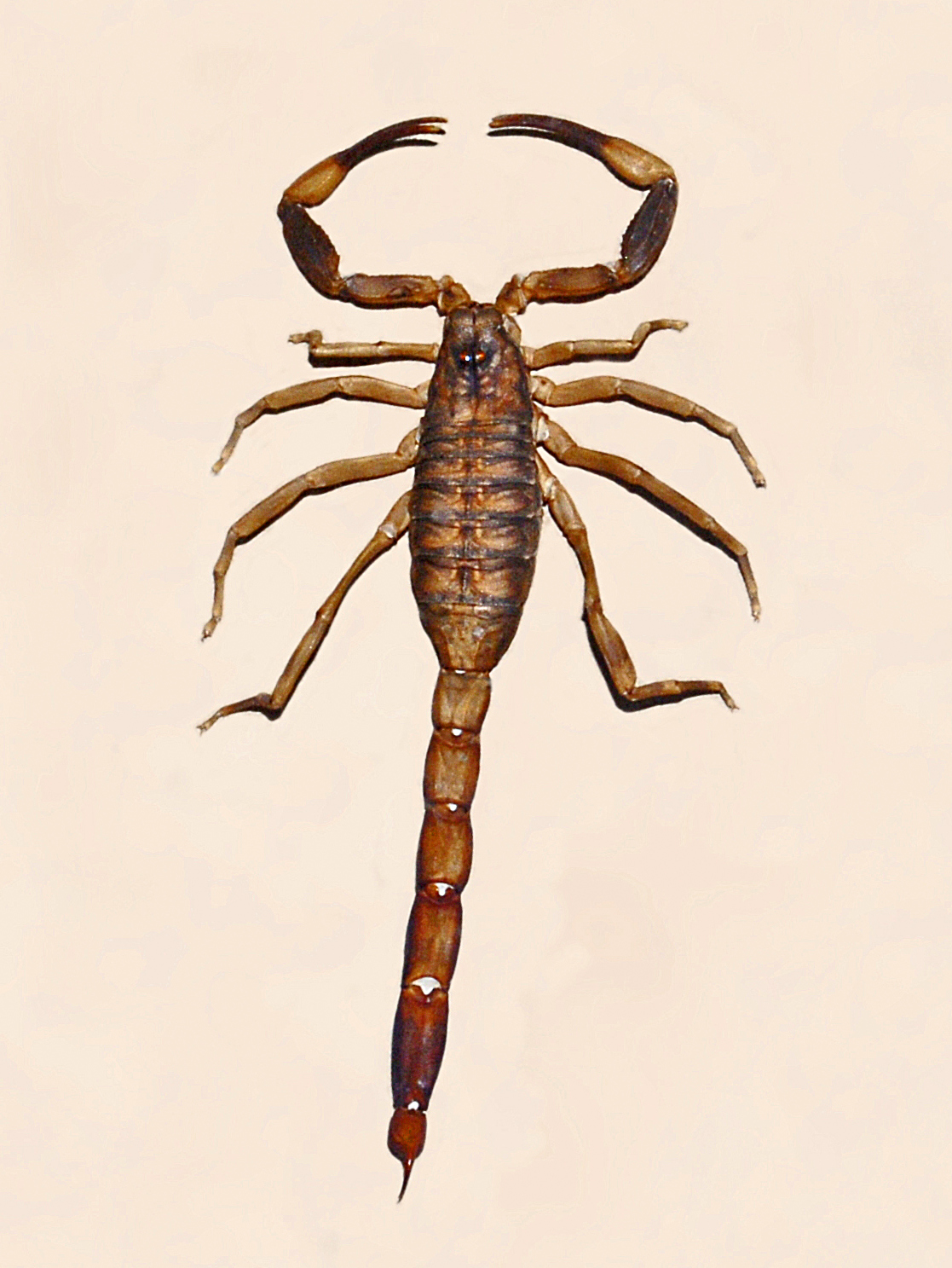
- Babycurus buettneri from the Republic of the Congo

Scientific classification
- Domain: Eukaryota
- Kingdom: Animalia
- Phylum: Arthropoda
- Subphylum: Chelicerata
- Class: Arachnida
- Order: Scorpiones
- Family: Buthidae
- Genus: Babycurus
- Species: B. buettneri

Binomial name
- Babycurus buettneri Karsch, 1886

Synonyms
- Babycurus centrurimorphus Karsch, 1886; Babycurus kirki (Pocock, 1890); Babycurus pictus Pocock, 1896; Rhoptrurus kirki Pocock, 1890

= Babycurus buettneri =

Species of scorpion

Babycurus buettneri is a species of scorpions belonging to the family Buthidae.

== Description ==
Babycurus buettneri can reach a length of 55–68 millimetres (2.2–2.7 in). The base color is reddish brown to dark brown.

== Distribution ==
This species is present in Cameroon, Central African Republic, Equatorial Guinea, Gabon and in the Republic of the Congo.
