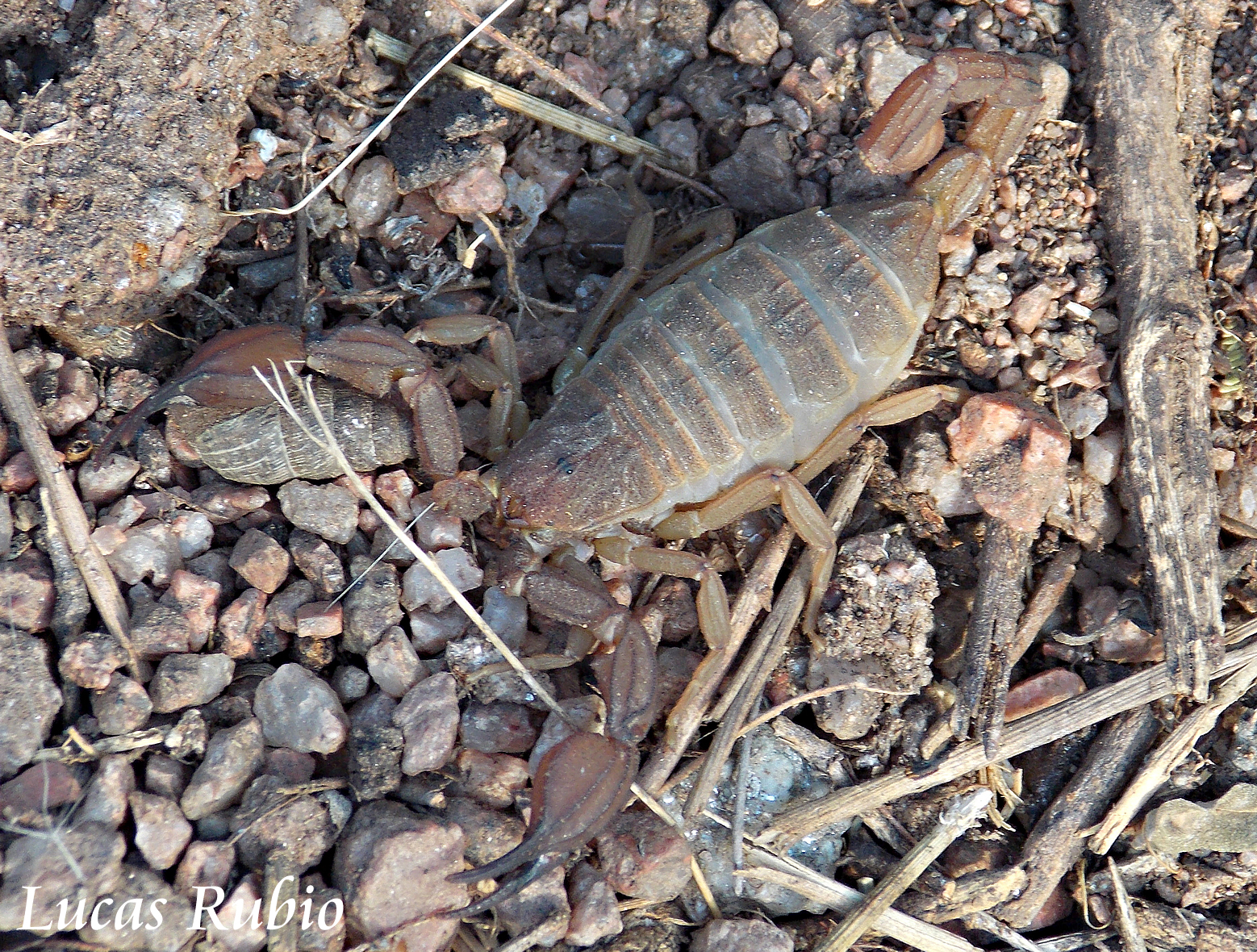

Scientific classification
- Domain: Eukaryota
- Kingdom: Animalia
- Phylum: Arthropoda
- Subphylum: Chelicerata
- Class: Arachnida
- Order: Scorpiones
- Family: Buthidae
- Genus: Zabius
- Species: Z. fuscus

Binomial name
- Zabius fuscus (Thorell, 1876)

= Zabius fuscus =

Species of scorpion

Zabius fuscus is a scorpion of the family Buthidae, and one of the three species in the genus Zabius. They can be found in the mountains of central Argentina, and in various cities that are located in the center of the country. The species are ghostly blue coloured. They prefer to live in deep crevices of large, half buried blocks or outcrops. Sometimes they might be found under stones. Just like any other scorpions they carry their young on their back.
