= Hemilychas =

Scientific classification
- Kingdom: Animalia
- Phylum: Arthropoda
- Subphylum: Chelicerata
- Class: Arachnida
- Order: Scorpiones
- Family: Buthidae
- Genus: Hemilychas; Hirst, 1911
- Species: H. alexandrinus

Binomial name
- Hemilychas alexandrinus (Hirst, 1911)

Synonyms
- Lychas (Hemilychas) alexandrinus Hirst, 1911; Lychas annulatus Glauert, 1925; Lychas truncatus Glauert, 1925

Genus of scorpion

Hemilychas is a monotypic genus of scorpions in the Buthidae family. Its sole species is Hemilychas alexandrinus. It occurs widely across mainland Australia and was first described by Arthur Stanley Hirst in 1911.

== Description ==
The scorpions are small and slender, growing to a maximum length of about 40 mm.
