= Aegaeobuthus cyprius =

Scientific classification
- Domain: Eukaryota
- Kingdom: Animalia
- Phylum: Arthropoda
- Subphylum: Chelicerata
- Class: Arachnida
- Order: Scorpiones
- Family: Buthidae
- Genus: Aegaeobuthus
- Species: A. cyprius

Binomial name
- Aegaeobuthus cyprius (Gantenbein & Kropf, 2000)

Species of scorpion

Aegaeobuthus cyprius, also known as the Cyprus scorpion, is a species of scorpion in the family Buthidae. The species was discovered in 2000 using molecular phylogenetics.
