= Uintascorpio =

Uintascorpio Temporal range: Lutetian 48.7 Ma

Scientific classification
- Kingdom: Animalia
- Phylum: Arthropoda
- Subphylum: Chelicerata
- Class: Arachnida
- Order: Scorpiones
- Family: Buthidae
- Genus: †Uintascorpio
- Species: †U. halandrasorum

Binomial name
- †Uintascorpio halandrasorum Perry, 1995

Synonyms
- Uintascorpio halandrasi

Extinct genus of scorpions

Uintascorpio is an extinct genus of scorpion in the family Buthidae and containing the single species Uintascorpio halandrasorum. The species is known only from the Middle Eocene Parachute Member, part of the Green River Formation, in the Piceance Creek Basin, Garfield County, northwestern Colorado, USA.

== History and classification ==
Uintascorpio halandrasorum is known only from one fossil, the holotype, specimen number "DMNH No. 6004". The specimen is composed of a single entire adult that is preserved as a compression fossil in finely bedded, light gray shale. The fossil was recovered by Gus and Christine Halandras of Meeker, Colorado from outcrops of the Green River Formations Parachute Member exposing sediments of Lake Unita, Rio Blanco County, Colorado, USA. The type specimen is currently preserved in the paleoentomology collections housed in the Denver Museum of Nature and Science, located in Denver, Colorado, USA. Uintascorpio was first studied by M. L. Perry with his 1995 brief description type description of the genus and species being published in a Grand Junction Geological Society publication. The generic name was coined by Perry as a combination of the Latin "scorpio" for scorpion, and "Uintah" referring to Lake Uintah of the Green River Formation. The etymology of the specific epithet halandrasorum is in recognition of Gus and Christine Halandras. The species name was originally spelled halandrasi by Perry, however, per the naming regulations in the International Code of Zoological Nomenclature, the species name was corrected to halandrasorum in the 2004 redescription of Uintascorpio.

When Uintascorpio halandrasorum was described, Perry placed the genus tentatively into the family Vaejovidae. This placement was not followed, however by later authors who mentioned the genus. The genus was suggested to be a member of Buthidae in a 1998 by Kovařík and possibly a synonym of the modern genus Rhopalurus. Papers in 2001 and 2003 left the genus as "Orthosternina incertae sedis" due to the limited nature of the type description and its illustrations. The Uintascorpio halandrasorum was redescribed in 2004 by Jorge Santiago-Blay, Michael Soleglad, and Victor Fet. In the redescription the placement of Uintascorpio into Buthidae was confirmed, but the synonymy with Rhopalurus as suggested by Kovařík was not.

== Description ==
The U. halandrasorum type specimen is a well-preserved complete adult shown in dorsal view. The specimen is 25.25 millimetres (0.994 in) in preserved length with an estimated total length of 39.25 millimetres (1.545 in). The specimen has a general coloration of brown tones, with the main carapace, mesosoma, and metasoma being a slightly darker tone than the pedipalps and legs. The tips of the cheliceral fingers are a dark brown, as is the articulation mechanism on patellae of leg IV.
