= Afrolychas =

Scientific classification
- Domain: Eukaryota
- Kingdom: Animalia
- Phylum: Arthropoda
- Subphylum: Chelicerata
- Class: Arachnida
- Order: Scorpiones
- Family: Buthidae
- Genus: Afrolychas; Kovarik, 2019

Genus of scorpions

Afrolychas is a genus of scorpion in the family Buthidae. There are two species in this genus, both of which used to belong to the genus Lychas. The genus was described in 2019 by František Kovařík. The genus name Afrolychas is a reference to the African range of its species and the fact that the two species used to be members of the genus Lychas. Afrolychas's closest relatives are believed to be the scorpions in the genus Pseudolychas. Afrolychas braueri is one of the rarest scorpions in the world, as it is listed as critically endangered on the IUCN Red List.

== Species ==
- Afrolychas braueri Kraepelin, 1896
- Afrolychas burdoi Simon, 1882
