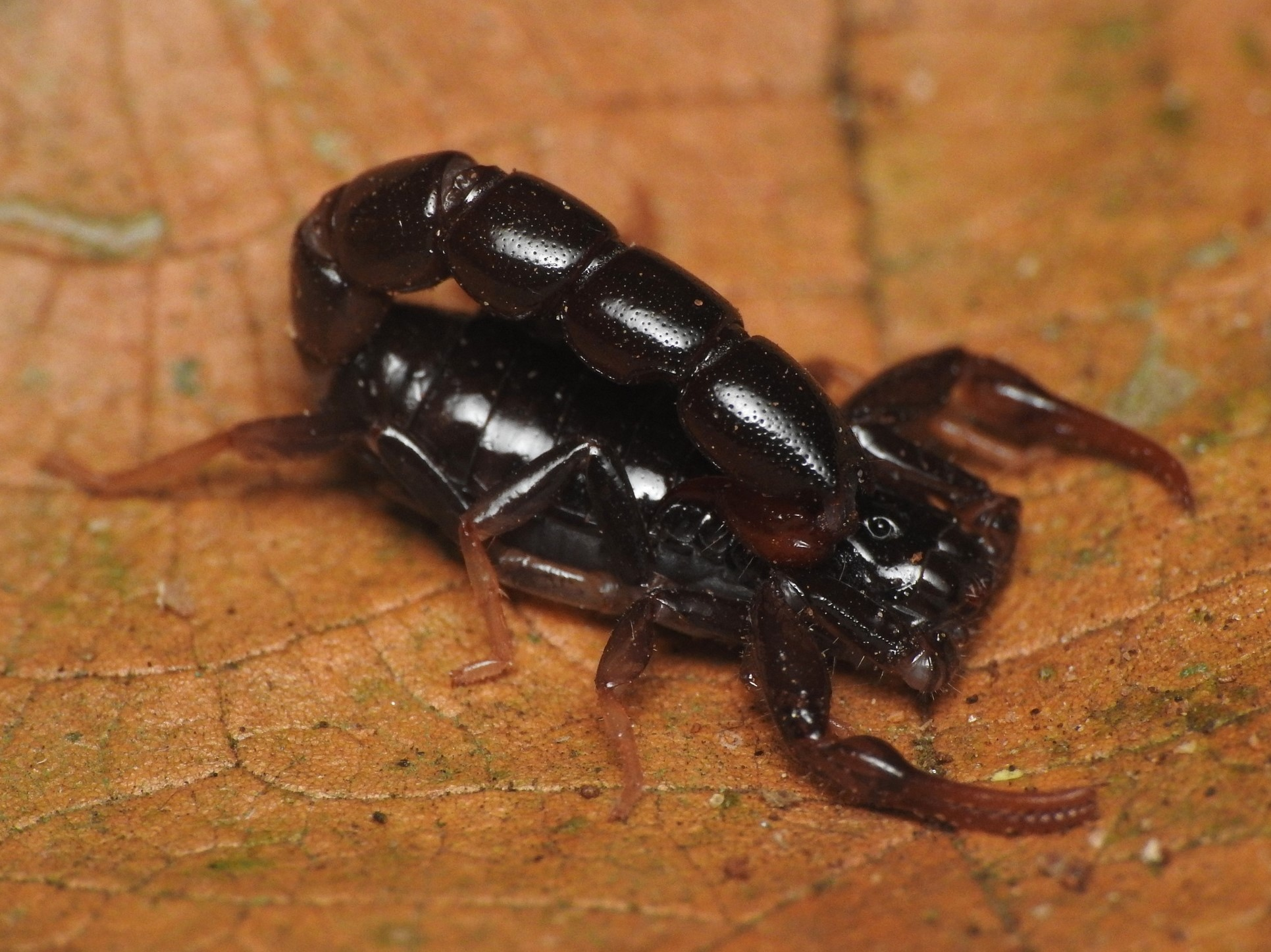

Scientific classification
- Kingdom: Animalia
- Phylum: Arthropoda
- Subphylum: Chelicerata
- Class: Arachnida
- Order: Scorpiones
- Family: Buthidae
- Genus: Buthoscorpio
- Species: B. sarasinorum

Binomial name
- Buthoscorpio sarasinorum (Karsch, 1891)

Synonyms
- Stenochirus sarasinorum Karsch, 1891; Buthoscorpio sarasinorum Fet, 1997

= Buthoscorpio sarasinorum =

Species of scorpion

Buthoscorpio sarasinorum is a species of scorpion in the family Buthidae. It is endemic to Sri Lanka. It is not known to be fatal to humans.

== Description ==
Total body length is 25 to 52 mm. Dentate margin of pedipalp chela is movable finger with distinct granules. Tergites and carapace are smooth to finely granular. Median eyes are located anteriorly. Dorsolateral carinae of metasomal segments III to IV are well developed. Dorsum of metasomal segments are mesially granulated. Metasomal segments I to V are granulated. Both sexes have 14 to 17 number of pectinal teeth. Telson lacks the subaculear tooth.
