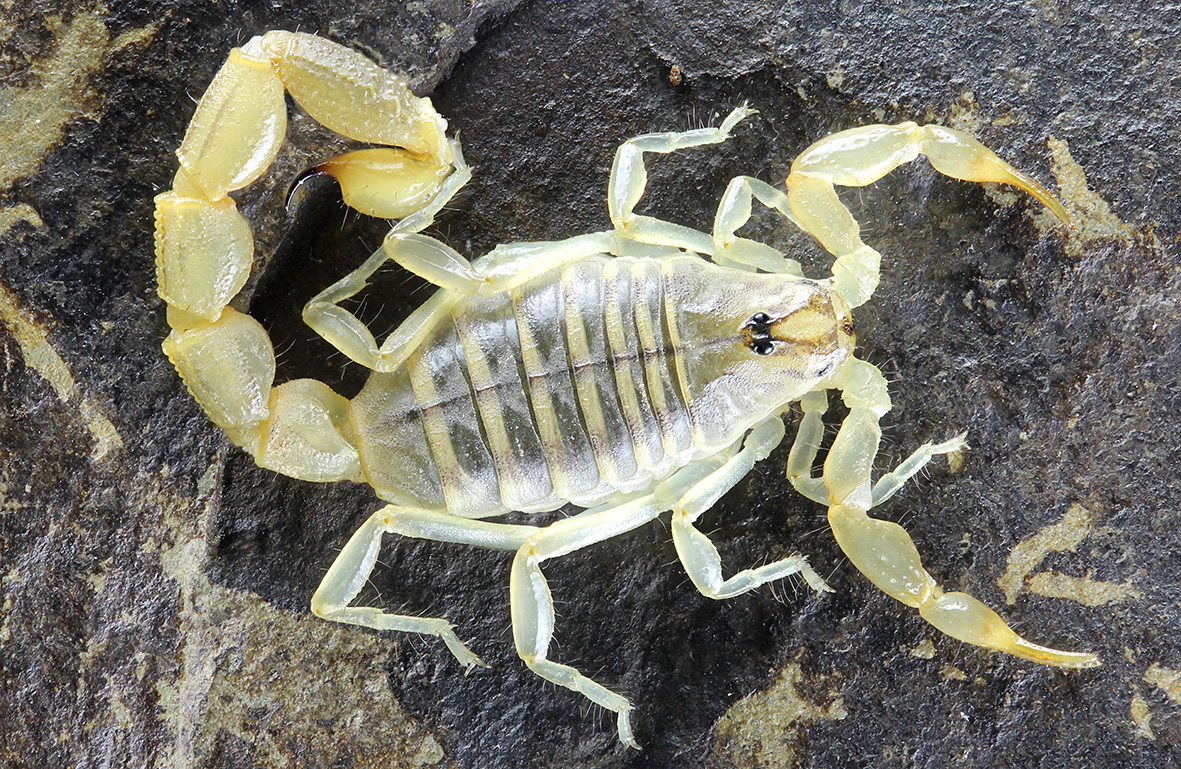
- Neobuthus erigavoensis

Scientific classification
- Kingdom: Animalia
- Phylum: Arthropoda
- Subphylum: Chelicerata
- Class: Arachnida
- Order: Scorpiones
- Family: Buthidae
- Genus: Neobuthus; Hirst, 1911

Type species
- Neobuthus berberensis Hirst, 1911

= Neobuthus =

Genus of scorpions

Neobuthus is a genus of scorpion of the family Buthidae. It is distributed across the Horn of Africa; in Eritrea, Ethiopia, Somaliland, Kenya and Djibouti.

== Taxonomy ==
First described by Hirst in 1911, the genus was redefined in 2012 in reviews by Kovařík and Lowe. With its difference from the genus Butheolus settled, it remained a poorly understood taxon due to lack of materials, with several isolated specimens acquired in 2010–2011 provisionally categorized as Neobuthus ferrugineus. Further expeditions to Somaliland, Kenya and Djibouti carried out in the following years allowed for the scope of the genus to be studied with more depth, with seven new species being confirmed in 2018. Neobuthus sudanensis, having a poor original description and still unexamined female specimen, is still unclear as an independent species.

== Species ==
- Neobuthus amoudensis Kovařík & Lowe, 2018
- Neobuthus awashensis Kovařík & Lowe, 2012
- Neobuthus berberensis Hirst, 1911
- Neobuthus cloudsleythompsoni Lourenço, 2001
- Neobuthus erigavoensis Kovařík & Lowe, 2018
- Neobuthus eritreaensis Kovařík & Lowe, 2016
- Neobuthus factorio Kovařík & Lowe, 2018
- Neobuthus ferrugineus Kraepelin, 1898
- Neobuthus gubanensis Kovařík & Lowe, 2018
- Neobuthus haeckeli Kovařík, 2019
- Neobuthus kloppersi Kovařík & Lowe, 2018
- Neobuthus kutcheri Lowe & Kovařík, 2016
- Neobuthus maidensis Kovařík & Lowe, 2018
- Neobuthus montanus Kovařík & Lowe, 2018
- Neobuthus solegladi Kovařík, 2019
- Neobuthus sudanensis Lourenço, 2005
