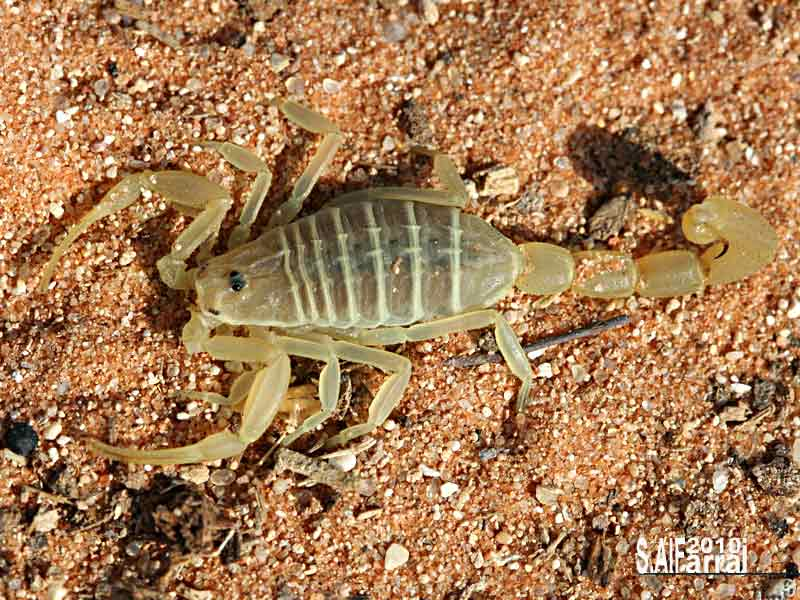
- Buthacus arabicus

Scientific classification
- Kingdom: Animalia
- Phylum: Arthropoda
- Subphylum: Chelicerata
- Class: Arachnida
- Order: Scorpiones
- Family: Buthidae
- Genus: Buthacus; Birula, 1908

Type species
- Androctonus (Leiurus) leptochelys Ehrenberg, 1829

Diversity
- About 22 species

= Buthacus =

Genus of scorpions

Buthacus is a genus of scorpions in the family Buthidae. Species of the genus are distributed across northern and western Africa, Israel, Palestine, Jordan, Syria, the Arabian Peninsula, Iraq, Iran, Afghanistan, and Pakistan.

== Taxonomy ==
The genus was erected in 1908 by A.A. Birula, originally as a subgenus of the genus Buthus. It was elevated to genus rank by M. Vachon in 1949.

=== Diversity ===
Species of the genus Buthacus are very similar to each other and have been considered subspecies in some examples. At least 36 species are known, some of need taxonomic revision:

- Buthacus agarwali Zambre & Lourenço, 2010
- Buthacus ahaggar Lourenço, Kourim & Sadine, 2017
- Buthacus algerianus Lourenço, 2006
- Buthacus amitaii Cain, Gefen & Prendini, 2021
- Buthacus arava Cain, Gefen & Prendini, 2021
- Buthacus arenicola (Simon, 1885)
- Buthacus armasi Lourenço, 2013
- Buthacus bicolor Afifeh, Al-Saraireh, Baker 2022
- Buthacus birulai Lourenço, 2006
- Buthacus clevai Lourenço, 2001
- Buthacus deserticus Sadine, Souilem, Lourenço & Ythier, 2024
- Buthacus elmenia Lourenço & Sadine, 2017
- Buthacus foleyi Vachon, 1949
- Buthacus frontalis Werner, 1936
- Buthacus fuscata Pallary, 1929
- Buthacus golovatchi Lourenço, Duhem & Cloudsley-Thompson, 2012
- Buthacus leptochelys (Ehrenberg, 1829) - Egyptian green scorpion
- Buthacus levyi Cain, Gefen & Prendini, 2021
- Buthacus macrocentrus (Ehrenberg, 1828)
- Buthacus mahraouii Lourenço, 2004
- Buthacus nigerianus Lourenço & Qi, 2006
- Buthacus nigroaculeatus Levy, Amitai & Shulov, 1973
- Buthacus nitzani Levy, Amitai & Shulov, 1973
- Buthacus occidentalis Lourenço, 2000
- Buthacus pakistanensis Lourenço & Qi, 2006
- Buthacus sadinei Ythier, 2022
- Buthacus samiae Lourenço & Sadine, 2015
- Buthacus spatzi (Birula, 1911)
- Buthacus spinatus Lourenço, Bissati & Sadine, 2016
- Buthacus stockmanni Kovařík, Lowe & Šťáhlavský, 2016
- Buthacus striffleri Lourenço, 2004
- Buthacus tadmorensis (Simon, 1892)
- Buthacus villiersi Vachon, 1949
- Buthacus williamsi Lourenço & Leguin, 2009
- Buthacus yotvatensis Levy, Amitai & Shulov, 1973
- Buthacus ziegleri Lourenço, 2000

== General characteristics ==
Small to moderately sized scorpions (40–75 mm). Most species are yellow, some are brownish, yellow-grayish or yellow-greenish colored. They show a rather slim habitus with long walking legs and a slender metasoma; pedipalp chelae very gracile and elongate. Cephalothorax smooth or with very weak carinae.

=== Toxicity ===
As in other buthids the venom in at least some species of Buthacus is relatively potent and can be of medical importance to humans.

Relative toxicity in species of Buthacus
Species	Median lethal dose (LD_{50} [mg/kg]_{mice})
B. arenicola	0.99 - 3.50
B. leptochelys	0.77 - 5.62

=== Habitat ===
Most species live in arid, rocky and sandy desert habitats, some in semi-arid steppe environments. As most other scorpions they shelter from daylight in rock crevices or burrows.
