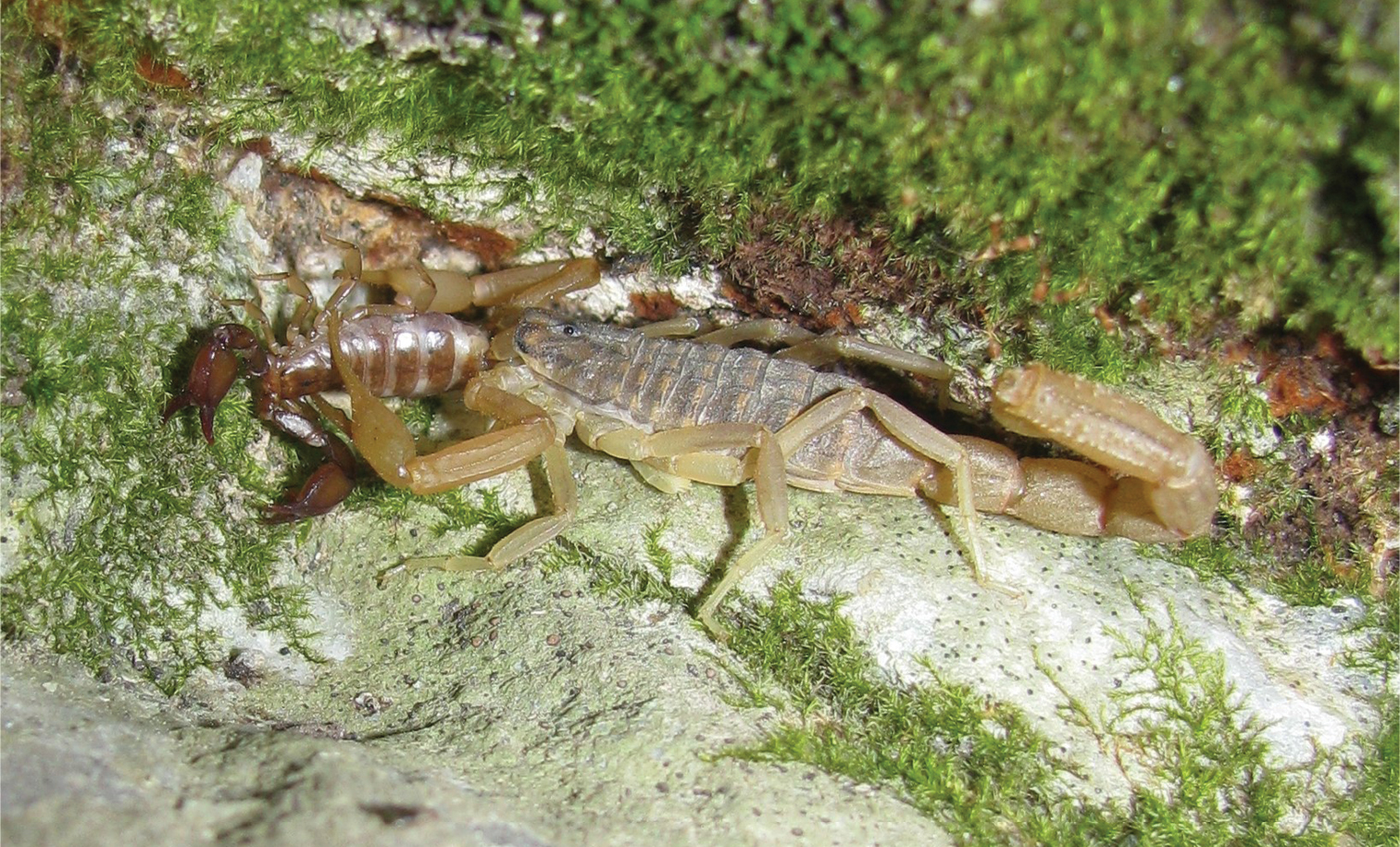
- Aegaeobuthus gibbosus feeding on Euscorpius avcii

Scientific classification
- Kingdom: Animalia
- Phylum: Arthropoda
- Subphylum: Chelicerata
- Class: Arachnida
- Order: Scorpiones
- Family: Buthidae
- Genus: Aegaeobuthus; Kovarik, 2019

Species
- Aegaeobuthus cyprius (Gantenbein & Kropf, 2000); Aegaeobuthus gallianoi (Ythier, 2018); Aegaeobuthus gibbosus (Brulle, 1832); Aegaeobuthus nigrocinctus (Ehrenberg, 1828)

= Aegaeobuthus =

Genus of scorpion

Aegaeobuthus is a genus of scorpion in the family Buthidae.

== Taxonomy ==
The genus was described by Kovařík (2019) to accommodate an eastern Mediterranean lineage previously included in Mesobuthus. It was established in order to restore monophyly after morphological analysis showed clear differences from Mesobuthus sensu stricto. Its type species is Buthus gibbosus Brullé, 1832.

=== Species ===
Currently there are four extant species in the genus:

- Aegaeobuthus cyprius (Gantenbein & Kropf, 2000)
- Aegaeobuthus gallianoi (Ythier, 2018)
- Aegaeobuthus gibbosus (Brulle, 1832)
- Aegaeobuthus nigrocinctus (Ehrenberg, 1828)
  - Subspecies Aegaeobuthus nigrocinctus bishri (Lourenco, 2020)
