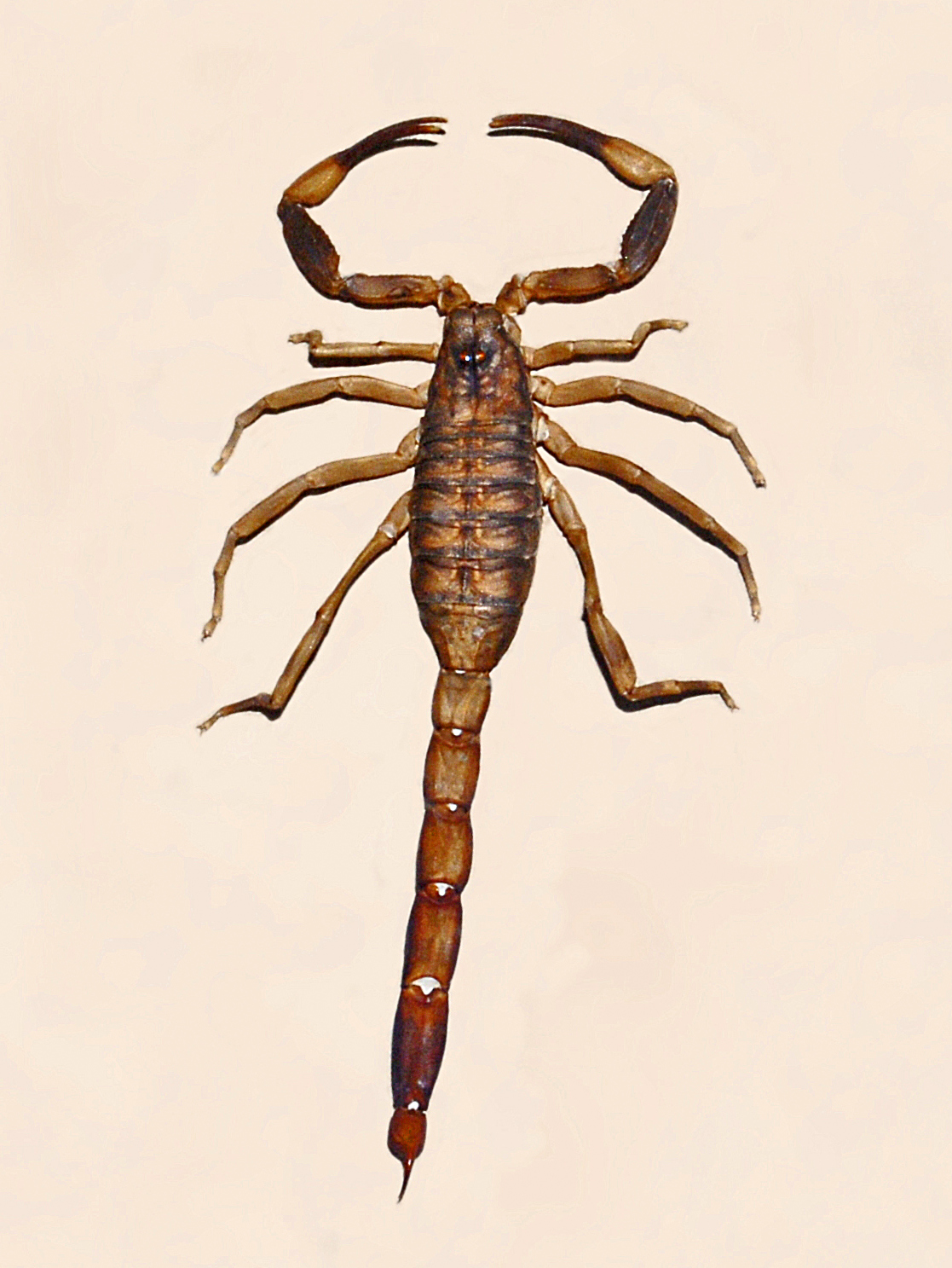
- Babycurus buettneri

Scientific classification
- Domain: Eukaryota
- Kingdom: Animalia
- Phylum: Arthropoda
- Subphylum: Chelicerata
- Class: Arachnida
- Order: Scorpiones
- Family: Buthidae
- Genus: Babycurus; Karsch, 1886

= Babycurus =

Genus of scorpions

Babycurus is a genus of scorpions of the family Buthidae.

== Species ==
- Babycurus ansorgei Hirst, 1911
- Babycurus buettneri Karsch, 1886
- Babycurus crassicaudatus Roewer, 1952
- Babycurus crassimanus Caporiacco, 1936
- Babycurus exquisitus Lowe, 2000
- Babycurus gigas Kraepelin, 1896
- Babycurus jacksoni (Pocock, 1890)
- Babycurus johnstonii Pocock, 1896
- Babycurus melanicus Kovařík, 2000
- Babycurus multisubaculeatus Kovařík, 2000
- Babycurus neglectus Kraepelin, 1897
- Babycurus ornatus Werner, 1936
- Babycurus patrizii Borelli, 1925
- Babycurus solegladi Lourenço, 2005
- Babycurus somalicus Hirst, 1907
- Babycurus subpunctatus Borelli, 1925
- Babycurus taramassoi Borelli, 1919
- Babycurus ugartei Kovařík, 2000
- Babycurus wituensis Kraepelin, 1913
- Babycurus zambonellii Borelli, 1902
