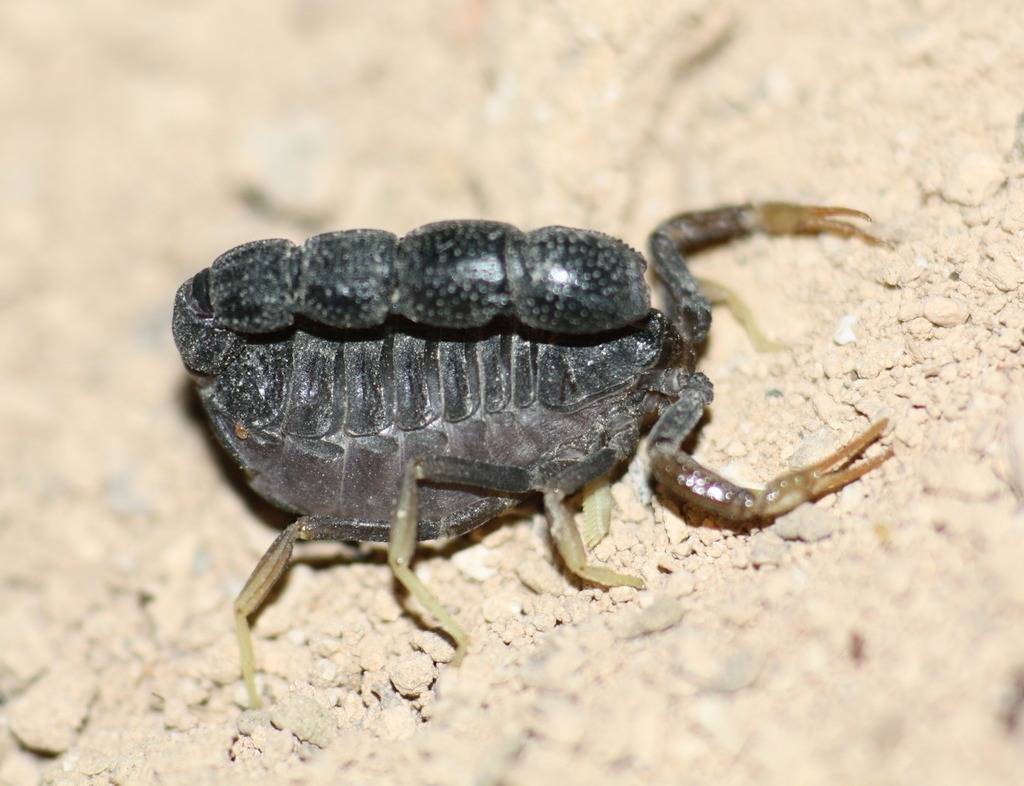
- Orthochirus negebensis

Scientific classification
- Kingdom: Animalia
- Phylum: Arthropoda
- Subphylum: Chelicerata
- Class: Arachnida
- Order: Scorpiones
- Family: Buthidae
- Genus: Orthochirus; Karsch, 1891

= Orthochirus =

Genus of scorpions

Orthochirus is a genus of scorpion in the family Buthidae, first described by Ferdinand Karsch in 1891.

== Species ==
Orthochirus contains the following fifty-seven species.

- Orthochirus afar Kovarik, Lowe & Stahlavsky, 2016
- Orthochirus afghanus Kovarik, 2004
- Orthochirus arenicola Lourenço & Ythier, 2021
- Orthochirus atarensis Lourenço & Leguin, 2011
- Orthochirus bastawadei Zambre, Mirza, Sanap, Upadhye & Javed, 2011
- Orthochirus bicolor (Pocock, 1897)
- Orthochirus birulai Kovarik, Fet & Yagmur, 2020
- Orthochirus carinatus Navidpour, Kovarik, Soleglad & Fet, 2019
- Orthochirus cloudsleythompsoni Lourenço & Leguin, 2011
- Orthochirus danielleae (Lourenço & Vachon, 1997)
- Orthochirus farzanpayi (Vachon & Farzanpay, 1987)
- Orthochirus feti Kovarik, 2004
- Orthochirus flavescens (Pocock, 1897)
- Orthochirus fomichevi Kovarik, Yagmur, Fet & Hussen, 2019
- Orthochirus formozovi Kovarik, Fet & Yagmur, 2020
- Orthochirus fuscipes (Pocock, 1900)
- Orthochirus gantenbeini Kovarik, Yagmur, Fet & Hussen, 2019
- Orthochirus glabrifrons (Kraepelin, 1903)
- Orthochirus gromovi Kovarik, 2004
- Orthochirus grosseri Kovarik, Fet & Yagmur, 2020
- Orthochirus gruberi Kovarik & Fet, 2006
- Orthochirus hormozganensis Kovarik & Navidpour, 2020
- Orthochirus heratensis Kovarik, 2004
- Orthochirus innesi Simon, 1910
- Orthochirus iranus Kovarik, 2004
- Orthochirus iraqus Kovarik, 2004
- Orthochirus jalalabadensis Kovarik, 2004
- Orthochirus kaspareki (Lourenço & Huber, 2000)
- Orthochirus kermanensis Kovarik & Navidpour, 2020
- Orthochirus kinzelbachi (Lourenço & Huber, 2000)
- Orthochirus kovariki Yagmur & Khalili, 2022
- Orthochirus krishnai Tikader & Bastawade, 1983
- Orthochirus kryzhanovskyi Kovarik, Fet & Yagmur, 2020
- Orthochirus kucerai Kovarik & Navidpour, 2020
- Orthochirus masihipouri Kovarik & Navidpour, 2020
- Orthochirus maroccanus Lourenço & Leguin, 2011
- Orthochirus melanurus (Kessler, 1874)
- Orthochirus mesopotamicus Birula, 1918
- Orthochirus milloti Lourenço, 2021
- Orthochirus minor Lourenço, Duhem & Cloudsley-Thompson, 2012
- Orthochirus monodi (Lourenço & Vachon, 1997)
- Orthochirus navidpouri Kovarik, Yagmur, Fet & Hussen, 2019
- Orthochirus negebensis Shulov & Amitai, 1960
- Orthochirus nordmanni Kovarik, Fet & Yagmur, 2020
- Orthochirus olivaceus (Karsch, 1881)
- Orthochirus pallidus (Pocock, 1897)
- Orthochirus persa (Birula, 1900)
- Orthochirus samrchelsis Kovarik, 2004
- Orthochirus scrobiculosus (Grube, 1873)
- Orthochirus sejnai Kovarik, Fet & Yagmur, 2020
- Orthochirus semnanensis Kovarik & Navidpour, 2020
- Orthochirus soufiensis Lourenco & Sadine, 2021
- Orthochirus stockwelli (Lourenço & Vachon, 1995)
- Orthochirus tassili Lourenço & Leguin, 2011
- Orthochirus tibesti Lourenço, Duhem & Cloudsley-Thompson, 2012
- Orthochirus varius Kovarik, 2004
- Orthochirus vignolii Kovarik & Navidpour, 2020
- Orthochirus zagrosensis Kovarik, 2004
