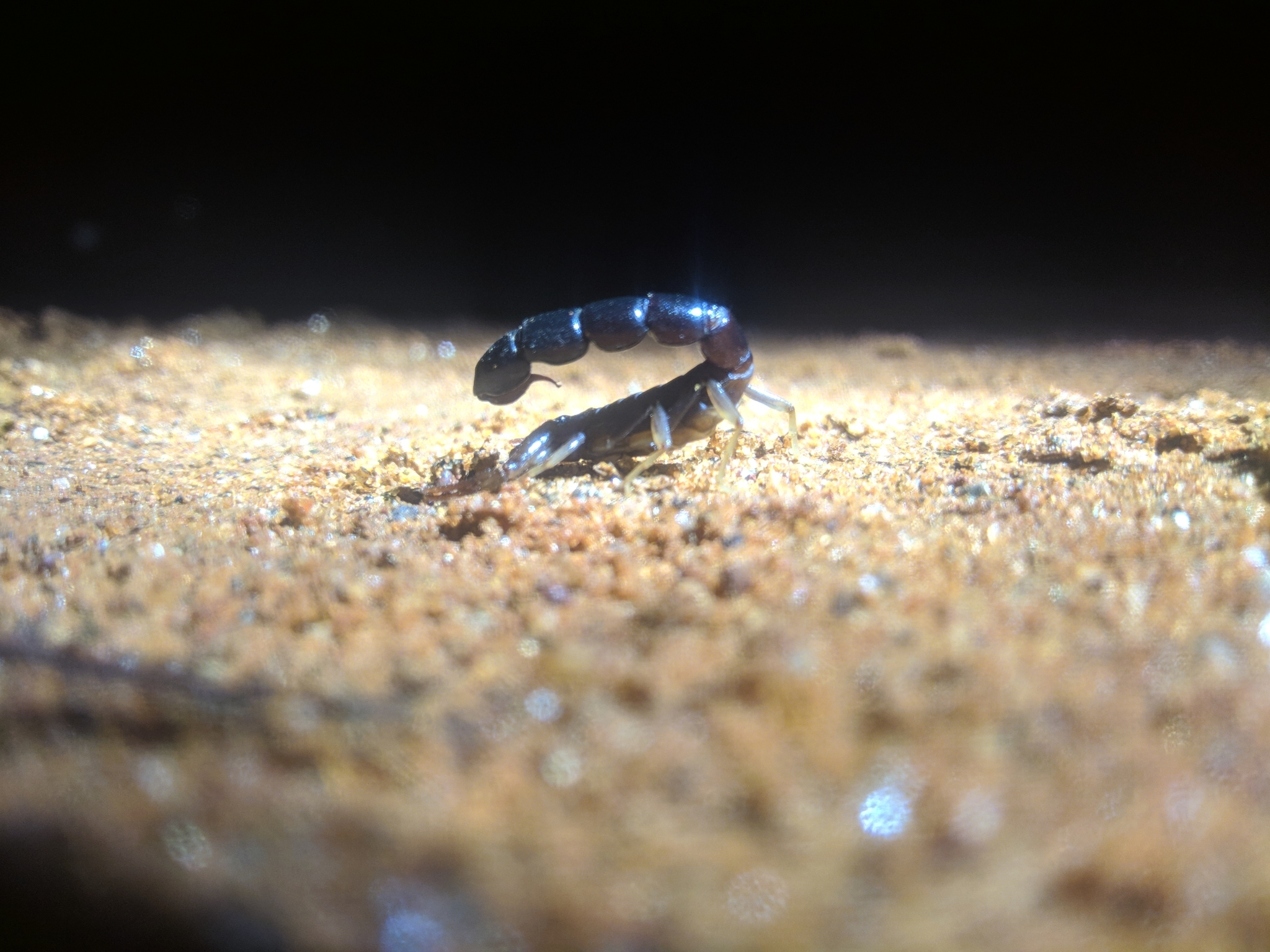
- Buthoscorpio politus

Scientific classification
- Kingdom: Animalia
- Phylum: Arthropoda
- Subphylum: Chelicerata
- Class: Arachnida
- Order: Scorpiones
- Family: Buthidae
- Genus: Buthoscorpio

Type species
- Buthoscorpio sarasinorum (Karsch, 1891)

Species
- See text

Synonyms
- Stenochirus Karsch, 1891 (nec. Stenochirus Oppel, 1861)

= Buthoscorpio =

Genus of scorpions

Buthoscorpio is a genus of scorpions in the family Buthidae.

== Taxonomy ==
- Buthoscorpio chinnarensis Aswathi, Sureshan & Lourenço, 2015
- Buthoscorpio indicus Lourenço, 2012
- Buthoscorpio jinnahii (Amir, Kamaluddin & Jabbar, 2005)
- Buthoscorpio politus (Pocock, 1899)
- Buthoscorpio rahmatii (Amir, Kamaluddin & Jabbar, 2005)
- Buthoscorpio rayalensis Javed, Rao, Mirza, Sanap & Tampal, 2010
- Buthoscorpio sarasinorum (Karsch, 1891)

== Distribution ==
Species of this genus are found in India and Sri Lanka.

== Description ==
The length of the scorpion ranges from 30 to 52 mm.
