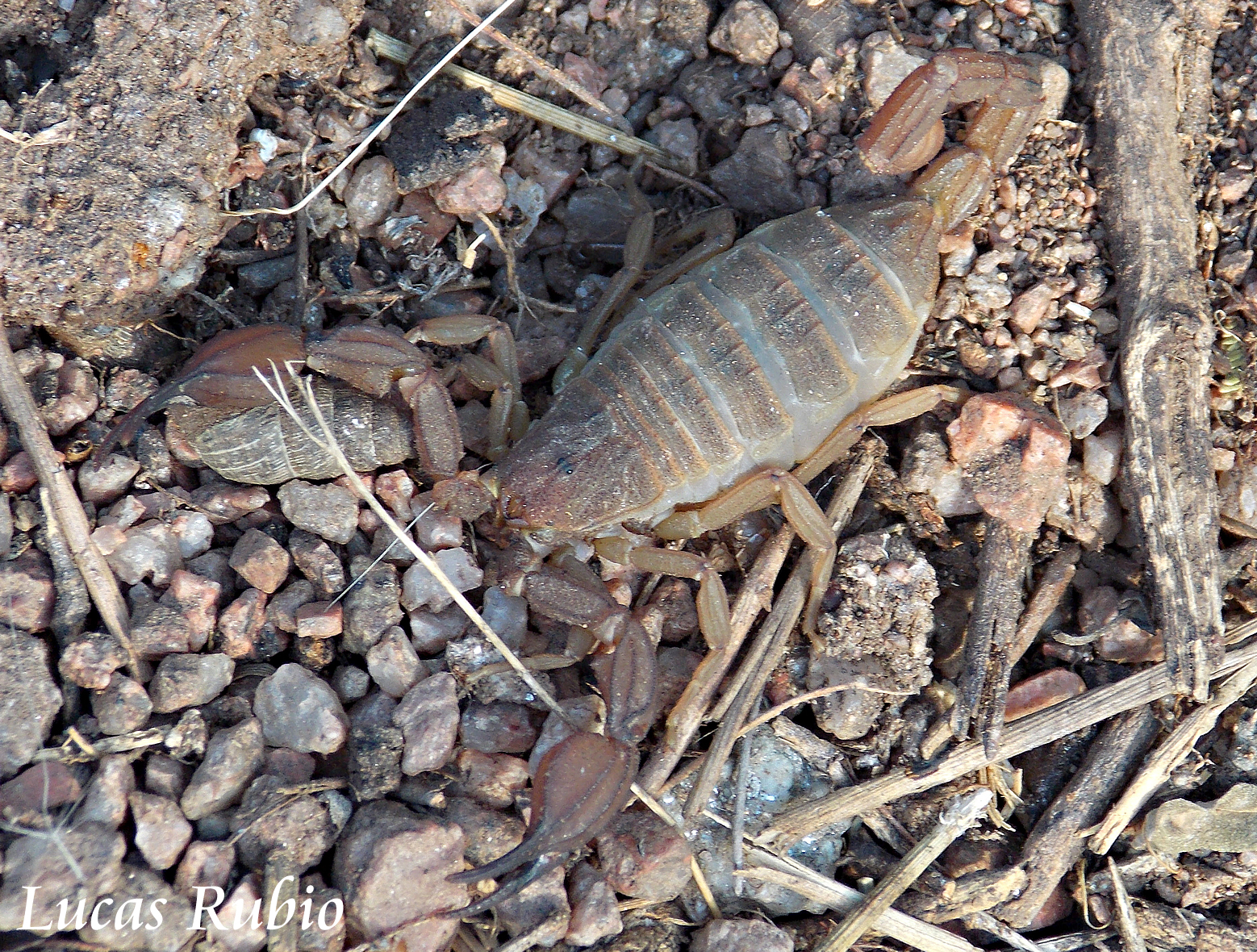

Scientific classification
- Domain: Eukaryota
- Kingdom: Animalia
- Phylum: Arthropoda
- Subphylum: Chelicerata
- Class: Arachnida
- Order: Scorpiones
- Family: Buthidae
- Genus: Zabius; Thorell, 1876

= Zabius =

Genus of scorpions

Zabius is a genus of scorpions in the family Buthidae. There are three species described in this genus.

== Species ==
- Zabius birabeni Mello-Leitão, 1938
- Zabius fuscus Thorell, 1876
- Zabius gaucho Acosta, Candido, Buckup and Brescovit, 2007
