= Somalibuthus =

Scientific classification
- Domain: Eukaryota
- Kingdom: Animalia
- Phylum: Arthropoda
- Subphylum: Chelicerata
- Class: Arachnida
- Order: Scorpiones
- Family: Buthidae
- Genus: Somalibuthus; Kovarik, 1998

Type species
- Somalibuthus demisi Kovarik, 1998

Genus of scorpions

Somalibuthus is a genus in the family Buthidae containing the following species:

- Somalibuthus demisi
- Somalibuthus sabae
