= Heteroctenus =

Scientific classification
- Kingdom: Animalia
- Phylum: Arthropoda
- Subphylum: Chelicerata
- Class: Arachnida
- Order: Scorpiones
- Family: Buthidae
- Genus: Heteroctenus; Pocock, 1893

Genus of scorpions

Heteroctenus is a genus of scorpions. The following species are assigned to this genus:

- Heteroctenus abudi (Armas & Marcano Fondeur, 1987)
- Heteroctenus aridicola (Teruel & Armas, 2012)
- Heteroctenus bonettii (Armas, 1999)
- Heteroctenus garridoi (Armas, 1974)
- Heteroctenus gibarae (Teruel, 2006)
- Heteroctenus granulimanus (Teruel, 2006)
- Heteroctenus junceus (Herbst, 1800)
- Heteroctenus melloleitaoi (Teruel & Armas, 2006)
- Heteroctenus princeps (Karsch, 1879)
