= Hemibuthus =

Scientific classification
- Kingdom: Animalia
- Phylum: Arthropoda
- Subphylum: Chelicerata
- Class: Arachnida
- Order: Scorpiones
- Family: Buthidae
- Genus: Hemibuthus

Genus of scorpions

Hemibuthus is a genus of buthid scorpions. The genus was described as Hemibuthus Pocock, 1900

== Species ==
Hemibuthus contains two species:

- Hemibuthus crassimanus Pocock, 1900
- Hemibuthus umarii Amir, Kamaluddin & Khan, 2004
