= Australobuthus =

Scientific classification
- Kingdom: Animalia
- Phylum: Arthropoda
- Subphylum: Chelicerata
- Class: Arachnida
- Order: Scorpiones
- Family: Buthidae
- Genus: Australobuthus; Locket, 1990
- Species: A. xerolimniorum

Binomial name
- Australobuthus xerolimniorum Locket, 1990

Genus of scorpion

Australobuthus is a monotypic genus of scorpions in the Buthidae family. Its sole species is Australobuthus xerolimniorum, also known as the salt lake scorpion. It is endemic to Australia and was first described by Nicholas Locket in 1990.

== Etymology ==
The generic name Australobuthus means ‘southern buthid’, with reference to the family. The epithet xerolimniorum ‘dry water body’ refers to the species’ habitat.

== Description ==
The scorpions are small, growing to a maximum length of about 45 mm. They are very pale in colour, largely lacking pigmentation.

== Distribution and habitat ==
The species is known only from the vicinity of salt lakes in inland South Australia.

== Behaviour ==
The scorpions are nocturnal surface foragers on the crusts and along the shorelines of salt lakes, preying on small invertebrates.
