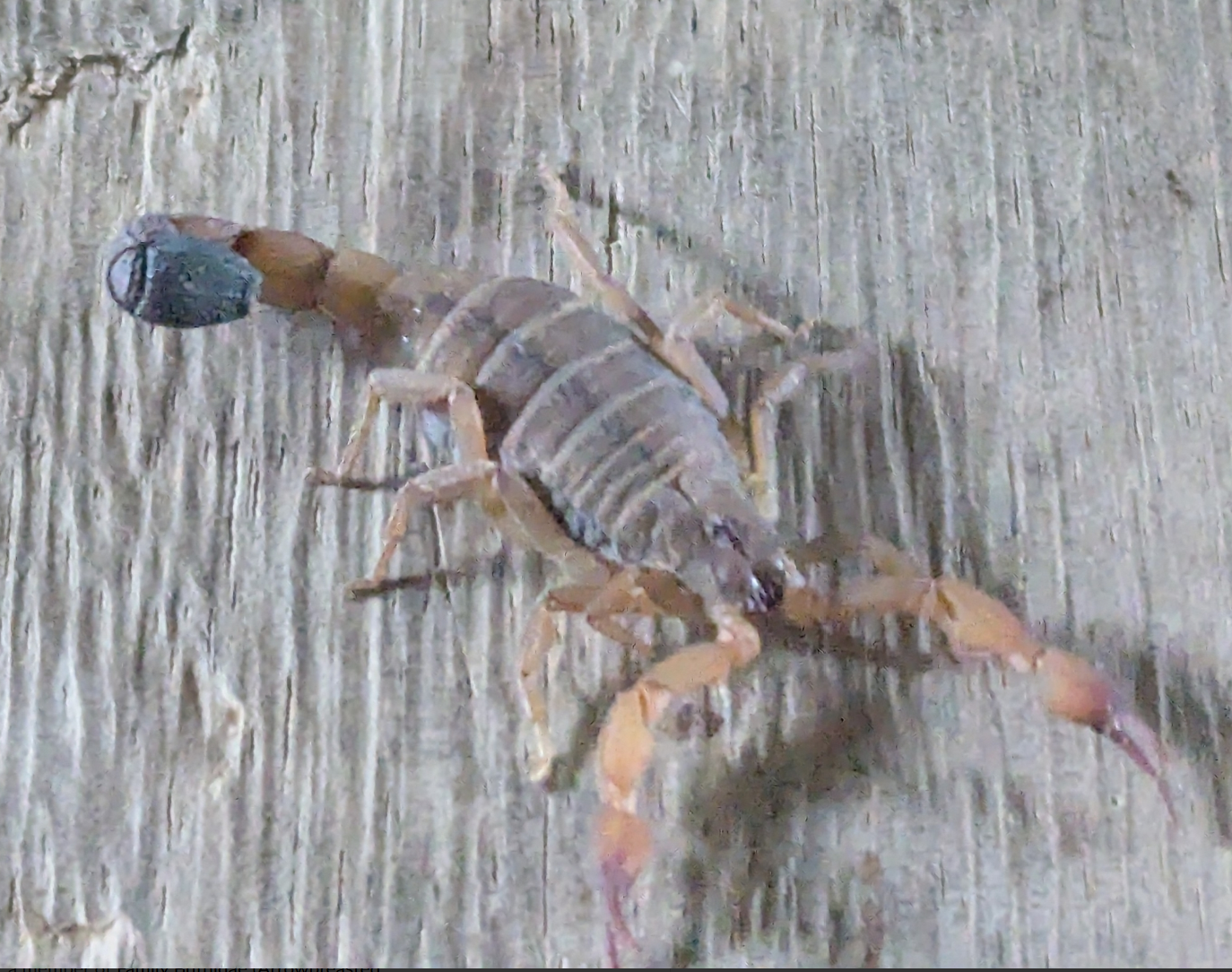
- Rhopalurus laticauda

Scientific classification
- Kingdom: Animalia
- Phylum: Arthropoda
- Subphylum: Chelicerata
- Class: Arachnida
- Order: Scorpiones
- Family: Buthidae
- Genus: Rhopalurus

= Rhopalurus =

Genus of scorpions

Rhopalurus is a genus of scorpions belonging to the Buthidae family. This genus was described in 1876 by Tord Thorell.

== Distribution ==
Rhopalurus is primarily distributed in the Cerrados and Caatingas formations of central and northeastern Brazil. One species is also known from a savannah formation inside oriental Amazonia. Three species are known from the savannahs of the Guayana Region, Venezuela. One species is also found in the Llanos de Orinoco, Venezuela, and one in the Llanos Orientales, Colombia

== Species ==
The following species are assigned to this genus:

- Rhopalurus acromelas Lutz & Mello, 1922
- Rhopalurus amazonicus Lourenço, 1986
- Rhopalurus bonetti Armas, 1999
- Rhopalurus borellii Pocock, 1902
- Rhopalurus brejo Lourenço, 2014
- Rhopalurus caribensis Teruel & Roncallo, 2008
- Rhopalurus crassicauda Di Caporiacco, 1947
- Rhopalurus danieli Prado & Rios-Patino, 1940
- Rhopalurus dorsomaculatus Prado, 1938
- Rhopalurus goiasensis Prado, 1940
- Rhopalurus iglesiasi Werner, 1927
- Rhopalurus lambdophorus Mello-Leitão, 1932
- Rhopalurus laticauda Thorell, 1876
- Rhopalurus melleipalpus Lutz & Mello, 1922
- Rhopalurus ochoai Esposito, Yamaguti, Souza, Pinto da Rocha & Prendini, 2017
- Rhopalurus piceus Lourenço & Pinto-da-Rocha, 1997
- Rhopalurus renelauerae Lourenço, 2016
- Rhopalurus rochai Borelli, 1910
- Rhopalurus virkkii Santiago-Blay, 2009

=== Former species ===
- Rhopalurus junceus - moved to Heteroctenus junceus
