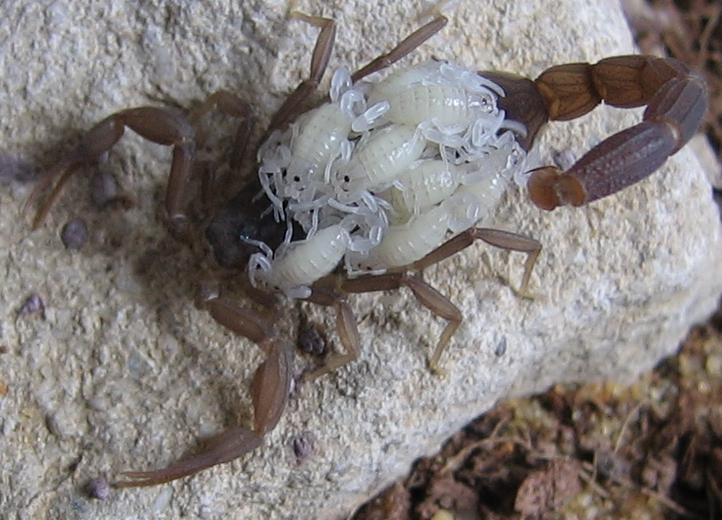
- Compsobuthus werneri female with young

Scientific classification
- Kingdom: Animalia
- Phylum: Arthropoda
- Subphylum: Chelicerata
- Class: Arachnida
- Order: Scorpiones
- Family: Buthidae
- Genus: Compsobuthus; Vachon, 1949

= Compsobuthus =

Genus of scorpions

Compsobuthus is a genus of buthid scorpions.

== Species ==
Compsobuthus contains many species, including:

- Compsobuthus abyssinicus (Birula, 1903)
- Compsobuthus acutecarinatus (Simon, 1882)
- Compsobuthus afghanus Kovarik & Ahmed, 2007
- Compsobuthus andresi Lourenço, 2004
- Compsobuthus arabicus Levy, Amitai & Shulov, 1973
- Compsobuthus becvari Kovarik, 2003
- Compsobuthus berlandi Vachon, 1950
- Compsobuthus birulai Lourenço, Leguin & Duhem, 2010
- Compsobuthus brevimanus (Werner, 1936)
- Compsobuthus carmelitis Levy, Amitai & Shulov, 1973
- Compsobuthus egyptiensis Lourenço, Sun & Zhu, 2009
- Compsobuthus fuscatus Hendrixson, 2006
- Compsobuthus garyi Lourenço & Vachon, 2001
- Compsobuthus humaae Amir, Kamaluddin & Kahn, 2005
- Compsobuthus jakesi Kovarik, 2003
- Compsobuthus jordanensis Levy, Amitai & Shulov, 1973
- Compsobuthus kabateki Kovarik, 2003
- Compsobuthus kafkai Kovarik, 2003
- Compsobuthus kaftani Kovarik, 2003
- Compsobuthus klaptoczi (Birula, 1909)
- Compsobuthus khaybari Abu Afifeh, Aloufi & Al-Saraireh, 2021
- Compsobuthus levyi Kovarik, 2012
- Compsobuthus longipalpis Levy, Amitai & Shulov, 1973
- Compsobuthus maindroni (Kraepelin, 1900)
- Compsobuthus manzonii (Borelli, 1915)
- Compsobuthus matthiesseni (Birula, 1905)
- Compsobuthus nematodactylus Lowe, 2009
- Compsobuthus pallidus Hendrixson, 2006
- Compsobuthus persicus Navidpour, Soleglad, Fet & Kovarik, 2008
- Compsobuthus petriolii Vignoli, 2005
- Compsobuthus polisi Lowe, 2001
- Compsobuthus plutenkoi Kovarik, 2003
- Compsobuthus rugosulus (Pocock, 1900)
- Compsobuthus schmiedeknechti Vachon, 1949
- Compsobuthus seicherti Kovarik, 2003
- Compsobuthus setosus Hendrixson, 2006
- Compsobuthus simoni Lourenço, 1999
- Compsobuthus sindicus Kovarik & Ahmed, 2011
- Compsobuthus sobotniki Kovarik, 2004
- Compsobuthus tassili Lourenço, 2010
- Compsobuthus tofti Lourenço 2001
- Compsobuthus tombouctou Lourenço, 2009
- Compsobuthus vachoni Sisson, 1994
- Compsobuthus werneri (Birula, 1908)
- Compsobuthus williamsi Lourenço, 1999
