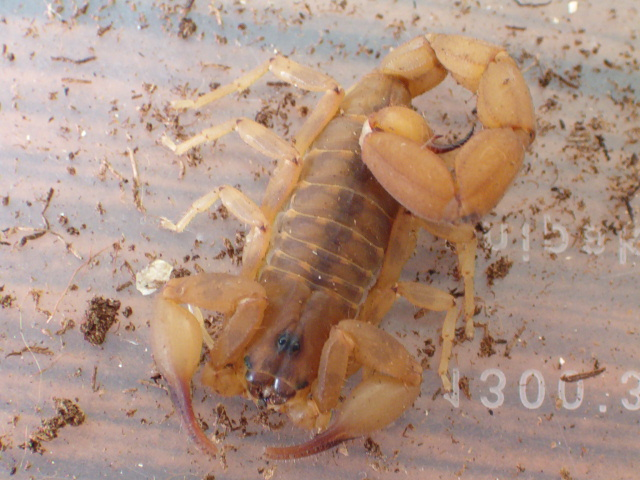

Scientific classification
- Domain: Eukaryota
- Kingdom: Animalia
- Phylum: Arthropoda
- Subphylum: Chelicerata
- Class: Arachnida
- Order: Scorpiones
- Family: Buthidae
- Genus: Odonturus
- Species: O. dentatus

Binomial name
- Odonturus dentatus (Karsch, 1879)

= Odonturus dentatus =

Species of scorpion

Odonturus dentatus, known as the Kenyan deathstalker or giant orange deathstalker, is a small (roughly 5 centimetres or 2 inches) scorpion native to Kenya, Somalia and Tanzania in East Africa. It is mainly found in warm but not too dry savannahs, where it lives under rocks, logs and other ground items. This species has the typical slender claws found in most members of the family Buthidae.
