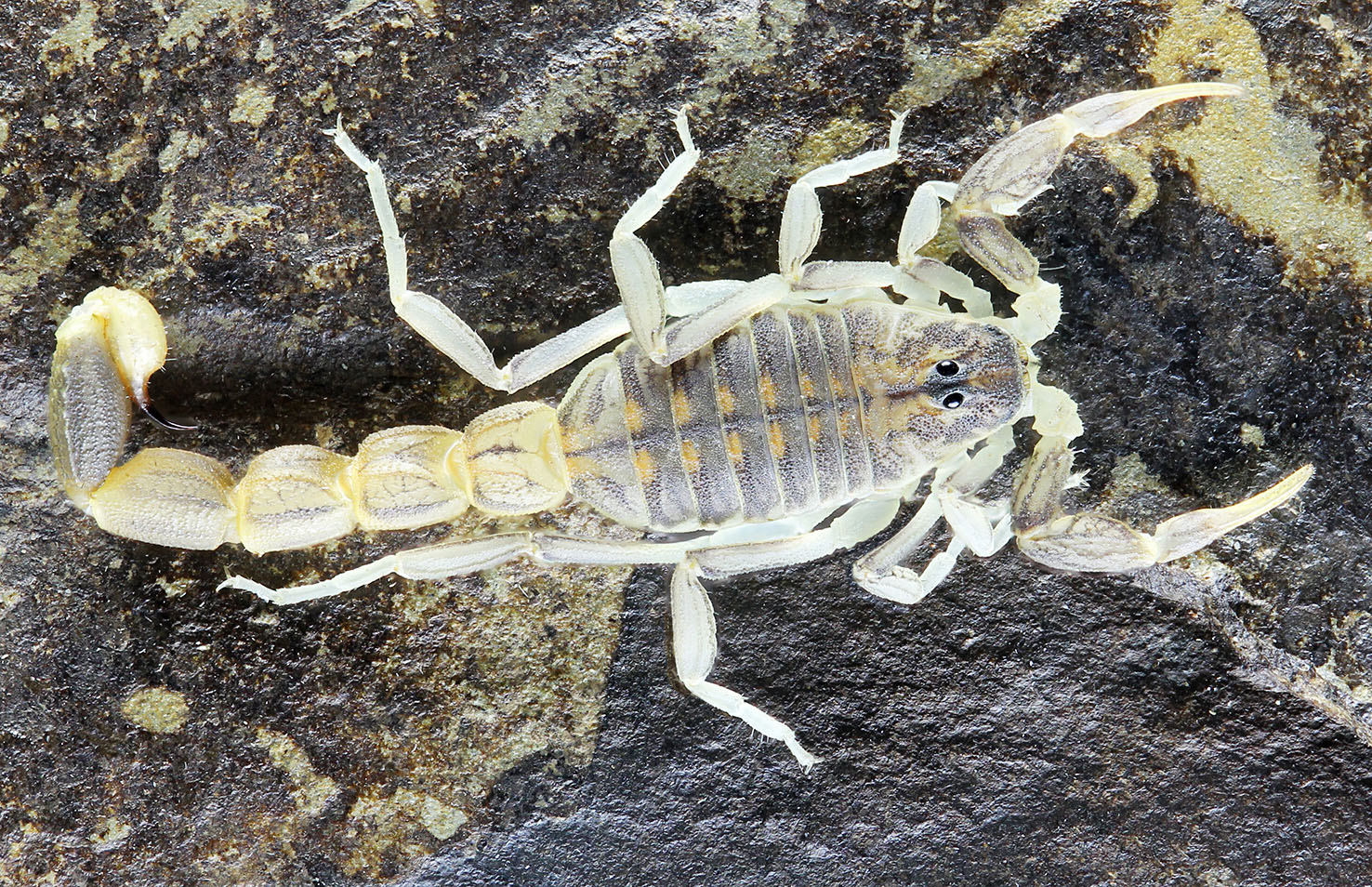
- Male specimen of Neobuthus factorio

Scientific classification
- Kingdom: Animalia
- Phylum: Arthropoda
- Subphylum: Chelicerata
- Class: Arachnida
- Order: Scorpiones
- Family: Buthidae
- Genus: Neobuthus
- Species: N. factorio

Binomial name
- Neobuthus factorio Kovařík, Lowe, Awale, Elmi, & Hurre, 2018

= Neobuthus factorio =

Species of scorpion

Neobuthus factorio is a species of scorpion from the family Buthidae found in Somalia.

== Taxonomy ==
Specimens of N. factorio may have been collected and temporarily categorized as Neobuthus ferrugineus since 2012. They were defined as a separate species once a larger number of samples could be collected between 2016–2018. The species was named after Factorio, a video game created by Michal Kovařík, the son of František Kovařík, one of the researchers who described the species.

== Description ==
The males are much smaller in size, being an average of 17–19 mm in length, while females are 24–27 mm. The pedipalps are relatively slender, with a matte, finely granulated texture in males, and smooth and glossy on females. The body's base colour is of a pale yellow, with dark patterns in the metasoma, pedipalps and legs.

== Distribution ==
N. factorio can be found in Somalia, on rocky areas of semi-desert, occasionally near river beds. The localities of Neobuthus factorio are near to the localities of Neobuthus berberensis.
