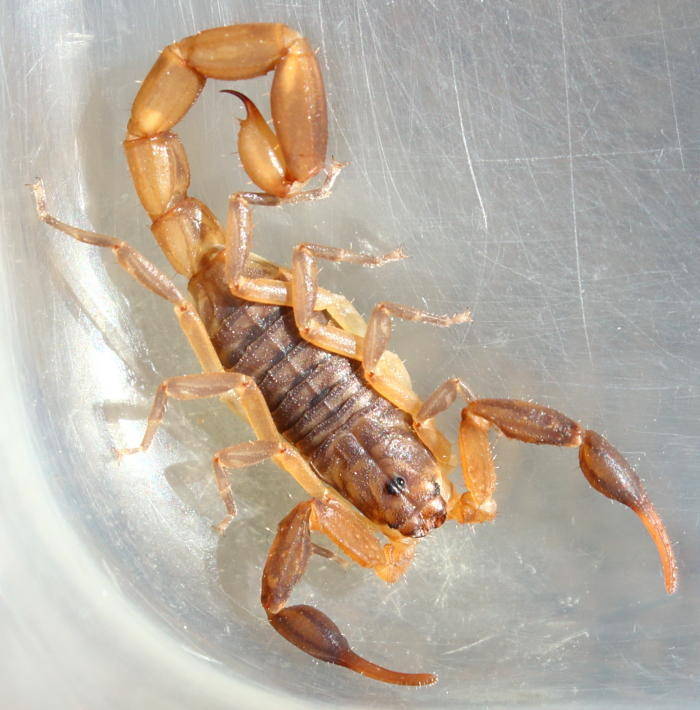
- Plain pygmy-thicktail scorpion (Pseudolychas ochraceus)

Scientific classification
- Domain: Eukaryota
- Kingdom: Animalia
- Phylum: Arthropoda
- Subphylum: Chelicerata
- Class: Arachnida
- Order: Scorpiones
- Family: Buthidae
- Genus: Pseudolychas; Kraepelin, 1911

= Pseudolychas =

Genus of scorpion endemic to Southern Africa

Pseudolychas is a genus of scorpion in the family Buthidae. Species of the genus are known as the pygmy-thicktail scorpions and are found in South Africa, Eswatini and Mozambique. Their venom is mild and not medically important.

Pseudolychas ochraceus reproduces by parthenogenesis.

== Range ==
Their range is restricted to the humid habitats of coastal and Afromontane forests; but are also found in the suburban setting of the South African highveld.

== Species ==
There are three species recognised:

- Plain pygmy-thicktail scorpion (Pseudolychas ochraceus) (Hirst, 1911)
- Eastern pygmy-thicktail scorpion (Pseudolychas pegleri) (Purcell, 1901)
- Transvaal pygmy-thicktail scorpion (Pseudolychas transvaalicus) Lawrence, 1961

== Gallery ==
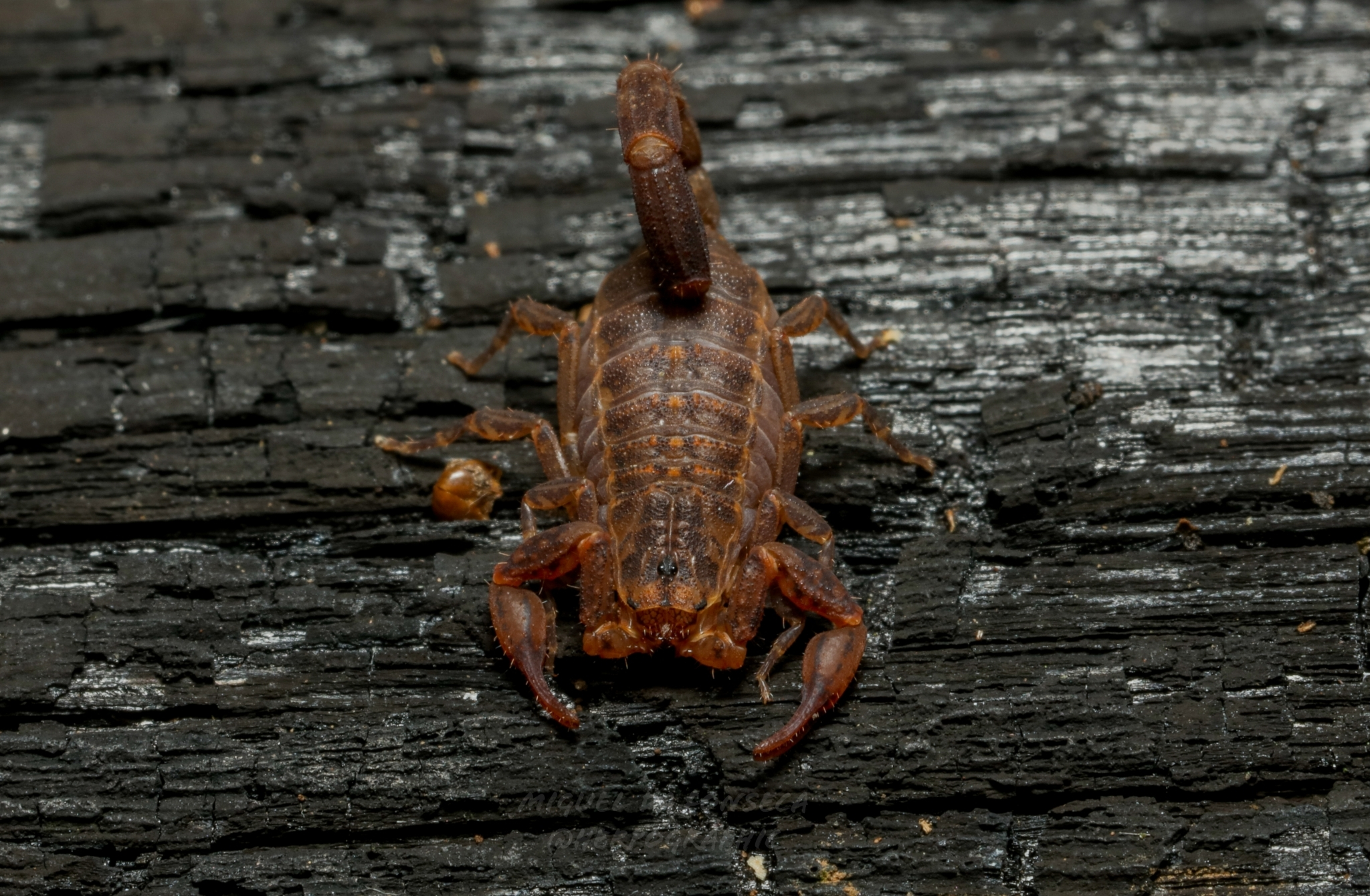
Eastern pygmy-thicktail scorpion (Pseudolychas pegleri)

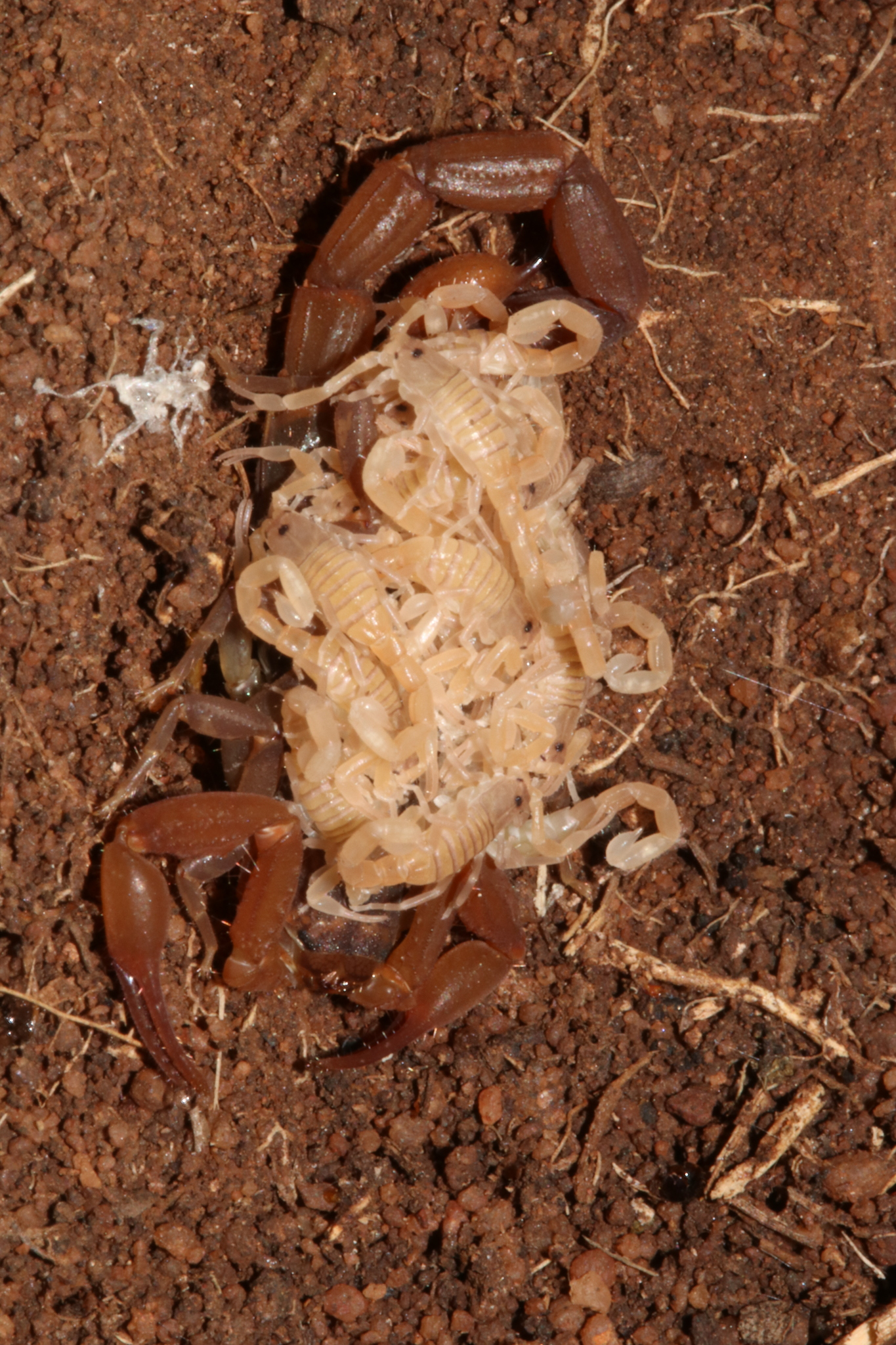
Plain pygmy-thicktail scorpion (Pseudolychas ochraceus) with young
