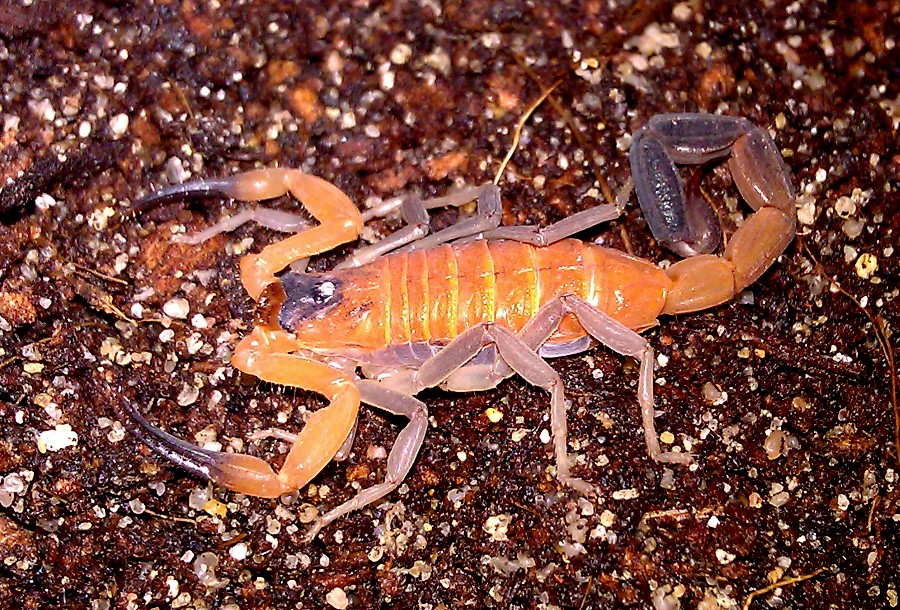
- Rhopalurus junceus

Scientific classification
- Kingdom: Animalia
- Phylum: Arthropoda
- Subphylum: Chelicerata
- Class: Arachnida
- Order: Scorpiones
- Family: Buthidae
- Genus: Heteroctenus
- Species: H. junceus

Binomial name
- Heteroctenus junceus (Herbst, 1800)

Synonyms
- Scorpio junceus Herbst; Scorpio hemprichii Gervais; Rhopalurus ravidus Franganillo; Rhopalurus cadenasi Moreno; Rhopalurus junceus (Herbst, 1800)

= Heteroctenus junceus =

Species of arachnid

Heteroctenus junceus, the red scorpion or blue scorpion, is an endemic species, one of 36 different types of scorpion found in Cuba and the Dominican Republic, as well as parts of Central America. It is called "blue scorpion" due to the peculiar blue tone on its tail and stinger; it is also known as "red scorpion" because it has a reddish dark body.

== Habitat ==
Heteroctenus junceus can inhabit ecosystems ranging from savanna forests to semi-desert areas. They are commonly found under rocks or fallen trees and throughout the epiphytic vegetation within the Bromeliads.

== Description ==
Full-grown adults reach 55–100 millimetres (2.2–3.9 in) in length. The body is yellowish brown, pink, orange, with a red or purple tail, a single stinger and the eight limbs darker, burgundy, purple or blackish, with a black triangle intercular. H. junceus has a life expectancy of three to five years, although lack of food results in only 15% reaching adulthood. Every year, hundreds of persons are stung by this scorpion in Cuba, but these stings are not dangerous because the venom has an LD_{50} of 8.0 mg/kg, which is far more venom than is carried in the stinger.

== Escoazul ==
Escoazul or escozul (from escorpión azul - in Spanish: blue scorpion - the name by which it is known in Cuba) refers to a mixture used in Cuban traditional medicine as an anti-inflammatory. The composition may vary, but always contains a diluted dose of Heteroctenus junceus venom.
