= Arthur Stanley Hirst =

English biologist (1883–1930)

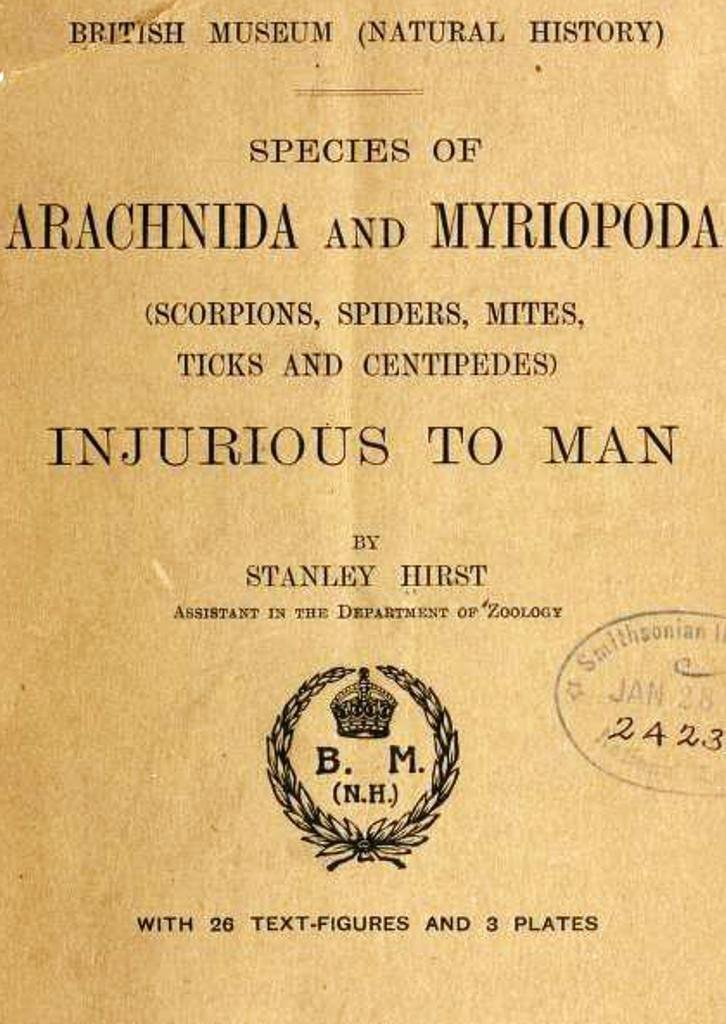
Title page of Hirst's Arachnida and Myriopoda Injurious to Man

Arthur Stanley Hirst (1883 – 4 May 1930) also known as Stanley Hirst, was an English arachnologist and myriapodologist on the staff of the British Museum, and was an authority on Arachnida, especially Acari (ticks and mites) Myriapoda.

Born in Hackney, where his father practiced medicine, Hirst was educated at the Merchant Taylor's School, and studied zoology at the University College London.

In October 1905 he was appointed as an assistant at the British Museum, where he at first worked on the mammal collection and shortly after was put in charge of the Arachnida and Myriapoda collections, succeeding Reginald Innes Pocock. With the abundant material he had at his disposal, he initially described new spiders, harvestmen, scorpions and millipedes, but soon worked mainly on mites and ticks. He also did some work on the spiders of Australia, the islands of the Indian Ocean, India and Africa.

In 1927 ill health forced him to leave the museum and go to Australia and a drier climate, where he continued his Acari studies at the University of Adelaide. He was succeeded as head of the arachnids section by Susan Finnegan, the first woman to be appointed to a post at the Natural History Museum. In April 1930, taking advantage of an improvement in his health, Hirst set off to return to England, but died at sea before arriving in Colombo.

== Publications ==
- Hirst, A. Stanley, 1909a. Arachnida. p. 158. In: "The Fauna of the Cocos-Kneeling Atoll", collected by F. Wood Jones (F. Wood Jones, ed.). Proceedings of the Zoological Society of London, 1909(1): 132–160.
- Hirst, A. Stanley, 1909b. "Ruwenzori Expedition Reports 6 Arachnida". London, Stanley Gardiner. No. xviii. The Araneae, Opiliones and Pseudoscorpiones. Transactions of the Linnean Society of London, Zoology, 19 pt. 1 pp. 57–58.
- Hirst, A. Stanley, 1911a. "On a collection of Arachnida and Chilopoda made by Mr. S. A. Neave in Rhodesia, north of the Zambesi". Manchester Mem. Lit. Phil. Soc. 2: 56. 11 pages.
- Hirst, A. Stanley, 1911b. "On some new Opiliones from Japan and the Loo-Choo Islands". Annals and Magazine of Natural History, London, ser. 8, 8: 625–636.
- Hirst, A. Stanley, 1911c. "Percy Sladen Trust Expedition to the Indian Ocean in 1905 under the leadership of Mr. J. Stanley Gardiner". No. xviii. The Araneae, Opiliones and Pseudoscorpiones. Transactions of the Linnean Society of London, Zoology, series 2, 14: 379–395.
- Hirst, [A.] Stanley, 1912. "Descriptions of new harvest-men of the family Phalangodidae". The Annals and Magazine of Natural History, Including Zoology, Botany, and Geology, London, 8th series, 10(55): 63–84, plate I.
- Hirst, A. Stanley, 1913. "The Percy Sladen Trust Expedition to the Indian Ocean in 1905 under the leadership of Mr. J. Stanley Gardiner". No. II. Second report on the Arachnida – The scorpions, pedipalpi, and supplementary notes on the opiliones and pseudoscorpions. Transactions of the Linnean Society of London, Zoology, series 2, 16: 31–37.
- Hirst, A. Stanley, 1914. "Report on the Arachnida and Myriapoda collected by the British Ornithologists' Union Expedition and the Wollaston Expedition in Dutch New Guinea". Transactions of the Linnean Society of London, Zoology, 20: 325–334.
- Hirst, A. Stanley, 1919. "Studies on Acari No. 1." The Genus Demodex, Owen. Trustees of the British museum, London.
- Hirst, A. Stanley, 1920. "Species of Arachnida and Myriopoda (scorpions, spiders, mites, ticks and centipedes) injurious to man". Trustees of the British museum, London.
- Hirst, A. Stanley, 1923. "On some arachnid remains from the Old Red sandstone (Rhyne chert bed, Aberdeenshire)". Annals and Magazine of Natural History, ser. 9, 12: 455–474.
- Hirst, A. Stanley, 1926. "On some new genera and species of Arachnida". Proceedings of the Zoological Society of London, 1925(84): 1271–1280.
