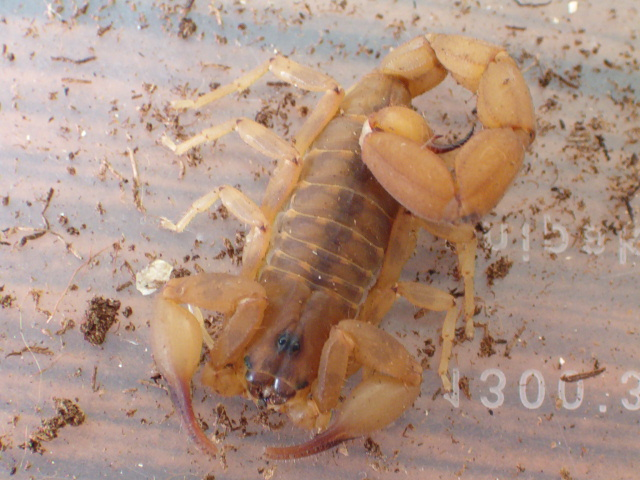
- Odonturus dentatus

Scientific classification
- Kingdom: Animalia
- Phylum: Arthropoda
- Subphylum: Chelicerata
- Class: Arachnida
- Order: Scorpiones
- Superfamily: Buthoidea
- Family: Buthidae; C. L. Koch, 1837

Subfamilies
- Buthinae; Centrurinae; Isometrinae; Tityinae

Synonyms
- List: Akentrobuthinae Lamoral, 1976; Androctonides C.L.Koch, 1837; Babycurini Pocock, 1896; Buthides C.L.Koch, 1837; "Centruroidinae" Roewer, 1943; Charminae Birula, 1917; Isometrini Kraepelin, 1891; Orthochirinae Birula, 1917; Microcharmidae Lourenco, 1996; Rhopalurinae Bücherl, 1971 (non Stunkard 1937); Rhopalurusinae Bücherl, 1969; Tityinae Kraepelin, 1905; Uroplectaria Pavlovsky, 1924

= Buthidae =

Buthidae Temporal range: Cenomanian to recent

Family of scorpions

The Buthidae are the largest family of scorpions, containing about 100 genera and 1300 species as of 2025. A few very large genera (Ananteris, Centruroides, Compsobuthus, or Tityus) are known, but a high number of species-poor or monotypic ones also exist. New taxa are being described at a rate of several new species per year. They have a cosmopolitan distribution throughout tropical and subtropical environments worldwide. Together with four other families, the Buthidae make up the superfamily Buthoidea. The family was established by Carl Ludwig Koch in 1837.

Around 20 species of medically important (meaning potentially lethal to humans) scorpions are known, and all but one of these (Hemiscorpius lepturus) are members of the Buthidae. In dead specimens, the spine beneath the stinger, characteristic for this family, can be observed.

== List of genera and number of species ==
The following genera are recognised in the family Buthidae:

- Aegaeobuthus Kovarik, 2019 (4 sp)
- Afroisometrus Kovarik, 1997 (1 sp)
- Afrolychas Kovarik, 2019 (2 sp)
- Akentrobuthus Lamoral, 1976 (2 sp)
- Alayotityus Armas, 1973 (8 sp)
- Androctonus Ehrenberg, 1828 (53 sp)
- Anomalobuthus Kraepelin, 1900 (6 sp)
- Apistobuthus Finnegan, 1932 (2 sp)
- †Archaeoananteroides Lourenço & Velten, 2016 (Cretaceous, Burmese amber)
- Australobuthus Locket, 1990 (1 sp)
- Babycurus Karsch, 1886 (14 sp)
- Baloorthochirus Kovarik, 1996 (1 sp)
- Barbaracurus Kovarik, Lowe & Stahlavsky, 2018 (13 sp)
- Birulatus Vachon, 1974 (4 sp)
- Buthacus Birula, 1908 (36 sp)
- Butheoloides Hirst, 1925 (19 sp)
- Butheolus Simon, 1882 (6 sp)
- Buthiscus Birula, 1905 (2 sp)
- Buthoscorpio Werner, 1936 (5 sp)
- Buthus Leach, 1815 (71 sp)
- Centruroides Marx, 1890 (104 sp)
- Charmus Karsch, 1879 (5 sp)
- Chaneke Francke, Teruel & Santibanez-Lopez, 2014 (4 sp)
- Cicileiurus Teruel, 2007 (1 sp)
- Cicileus Vachon, 1948 (5 sp)
- Compsobuthus Vachon, 1949 (57 sp)
- Congobuthus Lourenço, 1999 (1 sp)
- Darchenia Vachon, 1977 (1 sp)
- Egyptobuthus Lourenço, 1999 (1 sp)
- Femtobuthus Lowe, 2010 (1 sp)
- Fetilinia Lowe & Kovarik, 2021 (1 sp)
- Gint Kovarik, Lowe, Pliskova & Stahlavsky, 2013 (14 sp)
- Grosphus Simon, 1880 (14 sp)
- Hemibuthus Pocock, 1900 (2 sp)
- Hemilychas Hirst, 1911 (1 sp)
- Heteroctenus Pocock, 1893 (10 sp)
- Hottentotta Birula, 1908 (62 sp)
- Iranobuthus Kovarik, 1997 (1 sp)
- Ischnotelson Esposito, Yamaguti, Souza, Pinto da Rocha & Prendini (2 sp)
- Isometroides Keyserling, 1885 (1 sp)
- Isometrus Ehrenberg, 1828 (18 sp)
- Jaguajir Esposito, Yamaguti, Souza, Pinto da Rocha & Prendini, 2017 (3 sp)
- Janalychas Kovarik, 2019 (9 sp)
- Karasbergia Hewitt, 1913 (1 sp)
- Kraepelinia Vachon, 1974 (1 sp)
- Langxie Tang, Jia & Liu, 2023 (1 sp)
- Lanzatus Kovarik, 2001 (4 sp)
- Leiurus Ehrenberg, 1828 (26 sp)
- Liobuthus Birula, 1898 (1 sp)
- Lissothus Vachon, 1948 (3 sp)
- Lychas C.L. Koch, 1845 (33 sp)
- Mauritanobuthus Qi & Lourenço (1 sp)
- Mesobuthus Vachon, 1950 (31 sp)
- Mesotityus Gonzalez-Sponga, 1981 (1 sp)
- Microbuthus Kraepelin, 1898 (8 sp)
- Microcharmus Lourenço, 1995 (17 sp)
- Microtityus Kjellesvig-Waering, 1966 (41 sp)
- Neobuthus Hirst, 1911 (21 sp)
- Neogrosphus Lourenço, 1995 (3 sp)
- Neoprotobuthus Lourenço, 2000 (1 sp)
- Odontobuthus Vachon, 1950 (12 sp)
- Odonturus Karsch, 1879 (1 sp)
- Olivierus Farzanpay, 1987 (18 sp)
- Orthochiroides Kovarik, 1998 (4 sp)
- Orthochirus Karsch, 1891 (58 sp)
- Pantobuthus Lourenço & Duhem, 2009 (1 sp)
- Parabuthus Pocock, 1890 (44 sp)
- Pectinibuthus Fet in Orlov & Vasilyev, 1984 (1 sp)
- Physoctonus Mello-Leitao, 1934 (3 sp)
- Picobuthus Lowe, 2010 (2 sp)
- Plesiobuthus Pocock, 1900 (1 sp)
- Polisius Fet, Capes & Sissom, 2001 (1 sp)
- Pseudolissothus Lourenço, 2001 (1 sp)
- Pseudolychas Kraepelin, 1911 (3 sp)
- Pseudouroplectes Lourenço, 1995 (6 sp)
- Razianus Farzanpay, 1987 (4 sp)
- Reddyanus Vachon, 1972 (38 sp)
- Rhopalurus Thorell, 1876 (3 sp)
- Saharobuthus Lourenço & Duhem, 2009 (1 sp)
- Sahil Kovarik, 2024 (1 sp)
- Sanaag Kovarik, 2024 (1 sp)
- Sassanidotus Farzanpay, 1987 (2 sp)
- Somalibuthus Kovarik, 1998 (2 sp)
- Somalicharmus Kovarik, 1998 (1 sp)
- Spelaeolychas Kovarik, 2019 (1 sp)
- Teruelius Lowe & Kovarik, 2019 (22 sp)
- Thaicharmus Kovarik, 1995 (4 sp)
- Tityopsis Armas, 1974 (7 sp)
- Tityus C. L. Koch, 1836 (230 sp)
- Troglorhopalurus Lourenço, Baptista & Giupponi, 2004 (3 sp)
- Trypanothacus Lowe, Kovarik, Stockmann & Stahlavsky, 2019 (3 sp)
- †Uintascorpio Perry, 1995 (Eocene, Green River Formation)
- Uroplectes Peters, 1861 (37 sp)
- Vachoniolus Levy, Amitai & Shulov, 1973 (4 sp)
- Vachonus Tikader & Bastawade, 1983 (4 sp)
- Xenobuthus Lowe, 2018 (3 sp)
- Zabius Thorell, 1893 (3 sp)

== Description ==
Few Buthidae scorpions are among the larger scorpions; on average the members of this family are mid-sized tending towards smallish. Microtityus and Microbuthus barely reach 2 cm (0.8 in). The largest members are found among Androctonus (fattail scorpions), Apistobuthus, Centruroides, and Parabuthus; and can reach 12 cm (about 5 in). Most of them have between two and five pairs of eyes. Some resemble the Vaejovidae. The Chaerilidae and Chactidae have one pair of eyes at most, and the former show a yellowish spot between and to the rear of these.

Their vernacular name refers to the thick tails found in many Buthidae, especially in the Old World. The pedipalps, though, tend to be weak, slender, and tweezer-like. The Buthidae are generally rather cryptically colored, quite uniformly ochre to brown, but some are black or (like Centruroides and Uroplectes) more vividly colored. More conspicuous patterns and shapes occur, e.g., in Isometrus or Lychas.

== Toxicity and relationship with humans ==
Scorpions from the genera Androctonus, Centruroides, Hottentotta, (Note: May include some Mesobuthus, like the Indian red scorpion (M. tamulus)) Leiurus, Parabuthus, and Tityus are notorious for their strong venom. Human fatalities have been recorded from fewer than two dozen species; identification of a particular Tityus is likely problematic and detailed data on the venom exists only for a small fraction of the Buthidae (see BmKAEP from the venom of Mesobuthus martensii, for example). The venom of Rhopalurus junceus is used in Cuban traditional medicine and has been tested as a medication for cancer.

== Mechanism of toxicity ==
Studied Buthidae toxins have been found to hyperpolarize nerves and slow inactivation, causing painful nerve firing that can last for hours. Many toxins trigger Na+ channels to open prematurely, causing excess sodium ion leakage that triggers nerve signal transduction. Other toxins have been found to bind K+ leak channels to prevent the flow of potassium ions, disallowing the hyperpolarized nerve membrane from depolarizing and returning to its resting state.

The Na+ channel toxins of both Old World and New World Buthids (from Africa/Asia and the Americas, respectively) have a similar protein homology and mechanism of action. It is speculated that toxins from these two groups are derived from the evolutionary ancestor before divergence 150 million years ago.

== Gallery ==
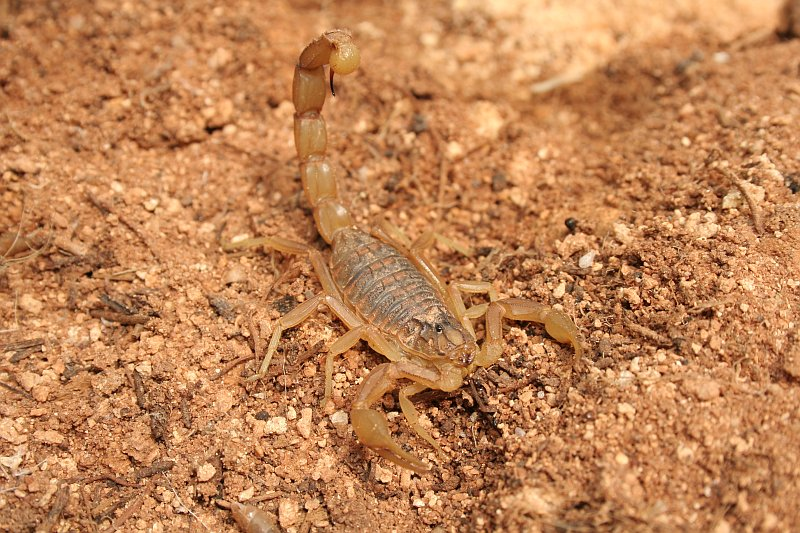
Buthus occitanus

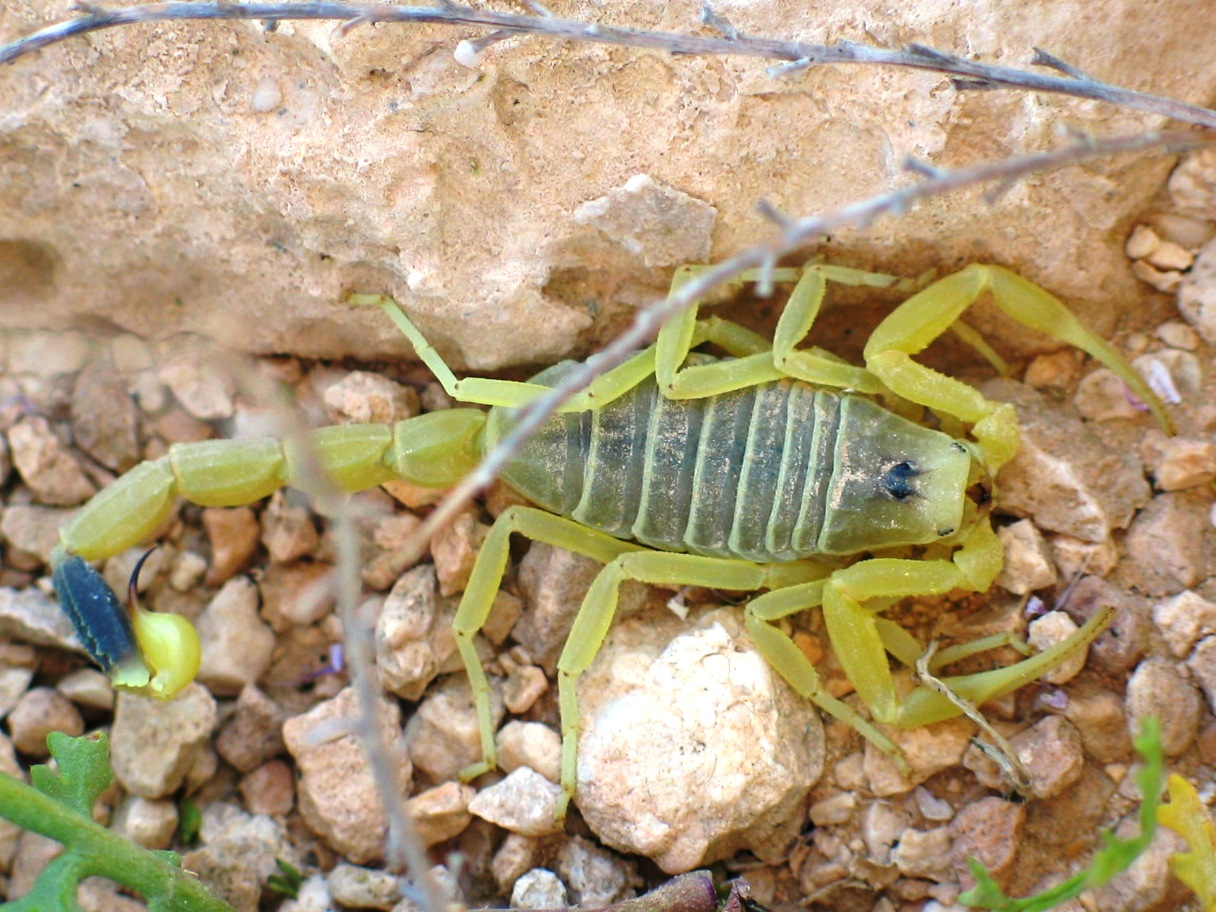
Leiurus quinquestriatus
