= Hefutoxin =

Hefutoxin family
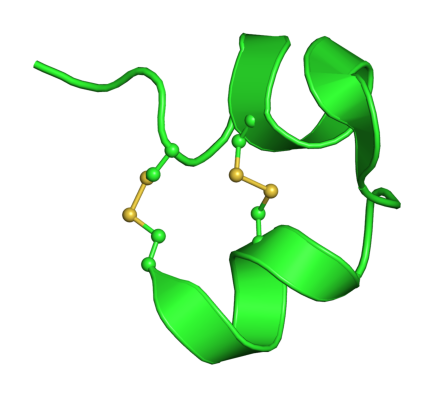
- kappa-hefutoxin 1 PDB entry 1hp9

Identifiers
- Symbol: Toxin_25
- Pfam: PF08095
- InterPro: IPR012630
Available protein structures:
- PDB: IPR012630 PF08095 (ECOD; PDBsum)
- AlphaFold: IPR012630; PF08095

Kappa- Hefutoxin 1 and 2 are toxins from the venom of the Asian forest black scorpion Heterometrus fulvipes with a unique structure. It blocks the potassium channels Kv1.2 and Kv1.3 and slows the activation of Kv1.3.

== Source ==
The kappa- Hefutoxin 1 and 2 (κ- hefutoxin1/2) are toxic components in the venom of Heterometrus fulvipes that belongs to the family scorpionidae. It is also known as the Asian Forest Black Scorpion and is distributed in South India, Indonesia and Malaysia.

== Chemistry ==
The structure of the toxin is unique because it is made up of two anti-parallel helices linked by two disulfide bridges without β- sheets. The κ- hefutoxin1 consists of 22 residues and with an amidated C terminus and is the shortest scorpion toxin reported so far. The κ- hefutoxin2 is built up of 23 residues with free C-terminus.

== Target and mode of action ==
The toxin blocks the voltage-gated potassium channel Kv1.2 and not only blocks the Kv1.3 channels but also slows down their activation kinetics. The blocking effect is most effective when the K^{+} ions flow inward thus at a negative potential.
