= Heteroscorpine =

Venom component

Heteroscopine (HS-1) is the main component of the venom of Heterometrus laoticus. It belongs to the Scorpine toxin family. It is a polypeptide consisting of a defensin-like component on its N-terminal end and a putative potassium channel blocking component on its C-terminal end. It has antimicrobial effect on some bacteria, but not on fungi.

== Sources ==
Heteroscorpine (HS-1) is a component of the venom of the Thai giant scorpion Heterometrus laoticus. This species is a member of the scorpion family commonly known as giant forest scorpions, indigenous to large parts of South and South-East Asia.

== Chemistry ==
The gene coding for HS-1 consists of one intron flanked by two exons. HS-1 is a polypeptide consisting of 95 amino acids. The HS-1 protein has a large resemblance to other toxins of the Scorpine family (which is a subgroup of the Beta-KTx toxin family). The polypeptides of the Scorpine family possess two structural and functional domains: a N-terminal α-helix (which has a cytolytic and/or antimicrobial activity similar to that of insect defensins), and a C-terminal region with a CSαβ motif, which causes potassium channel-blocking activity. HS-1 is highly homologous in particular to the Scorpine toxin Panscorpine (from Emperor scorpion) and Opiscorpine (from Opistophthalmus carinatus), with an 80% similarity in amino acid sequence. Opiscorpine and HS-1 are both classified as scorpine-like peptides. Based on its sequence homology with other scorpine-like peptides, HS-1 is likely to be a voltage-gated potassium channel blocker. HS-1 also has antimicrobial effects on some bacterial species, i.e. Bacillus subtilis, Klebsiella pneumoniae and Pseudomonas aeruginosa; it has no inhibitory effects on fungi. The inhibitory effect on bacteria has no gram specificity. Scanning electron microscopy shows that HS-1 causes roughening and blebbing of bacterial cell surfaces. HS-1 contains three disulfide bridges followed by a typical Cys pattern, similar to that of invertebrate defensins. Thus, HS-1 is likely to act accordingly.

== Toxicity ==
Symptoms from envenomation in humans from the Heterometrus genera are reported to be of mild severity. Sting can cause redness, swelling, inflammation and pain for hours up to a few days. Injection of the purified toxin in crickets causes paralysis.
