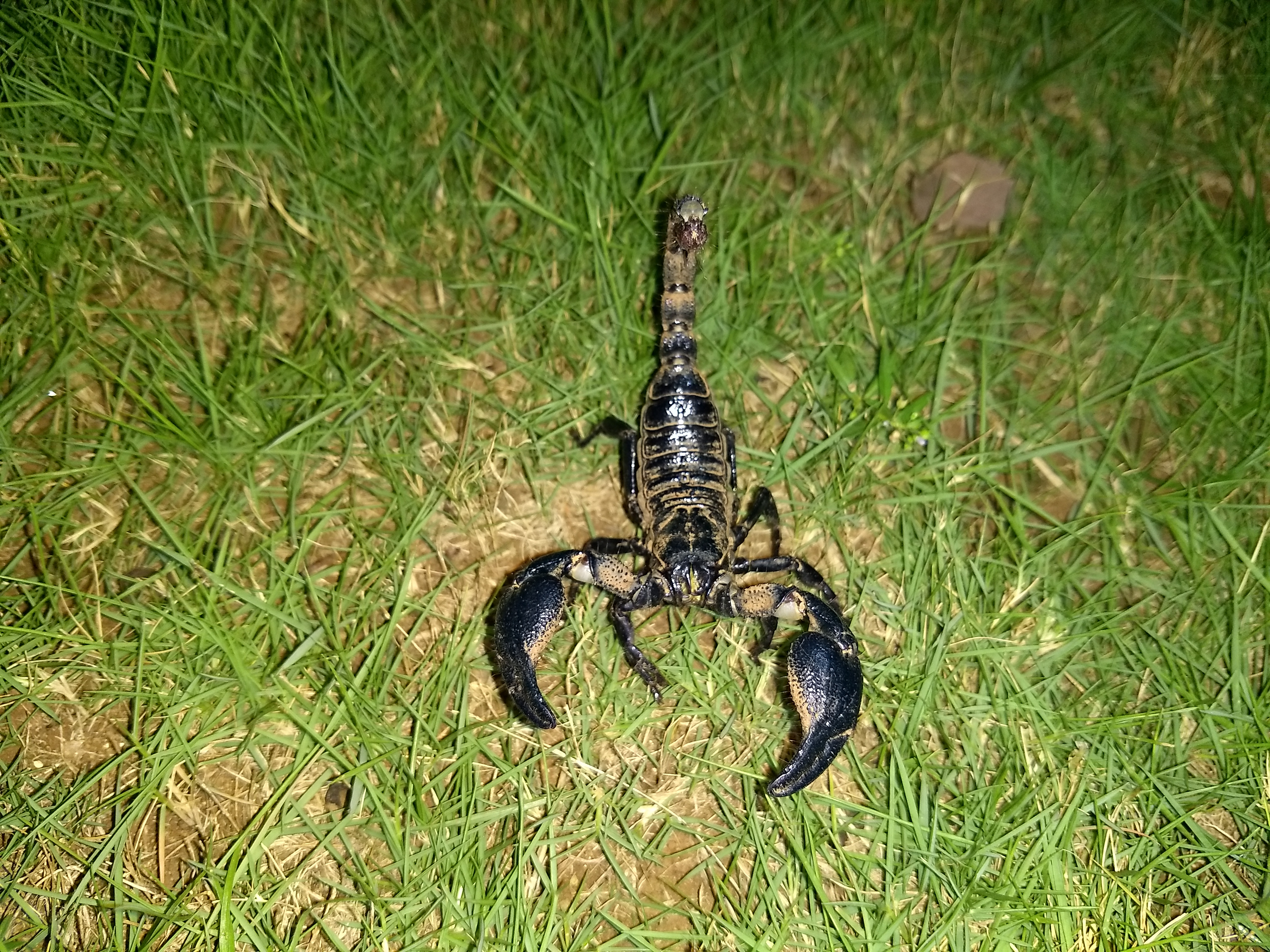

Scientific classification
- Kingdom: Animalia
- Phylum: Arthropoda
- Subphylum: Chelicerata
- Class: Arachnida
- Order: Scorpiones
- Family: Scorpionidae
- Genus: Deccanometrus
- Species: D. bengalensis

Binomial name
- Deccanometrus bengalensis (C. L. Koch, 1841)

Synonyms
- Heterometrus bengalensis (C. L. Koch, 1841)

= Deccanometrus bengalensis =

Species of scoprion

Deccanometrus bengalensis, the Indian black scorpion, is a species of scorpions belonging to the family Scorpionidae. It was discovered by Carl Ludwig Koch in 1841.

== Description ==
Adult specimens grow to a length of 95 to 115 millimeters and a dark reddish-brown to light-brown body color. The combs of the pecten organ have 14 to 17 teeth in both sexes. The chela, femora, and patella of the pedipalps are narrower and longer in the males than in the females. The surfaces of the chelae are uneven, but without pronounced granules and keels. The telson is hairy and spherical, with a poison bladder that is longer than the stinger.

== Distribution and habitat ==
Deccanometrus bengalensis originates from the Indian states of West Bengal and Odisha. This species lives in dry areas, preferably on the edges of ditches, on which thicker vegetation with shrubs provides ideal shade and cover. Older distribution data, including Uttar Pradesh, Madhya Pradesh, Assam, Meghalaya and Maharashtra, may be based on confusion with other species of the genus Deccanometrus.

== Venom ==
The venom of this species has been subject to cancer study, specifically on leukemia. The protein bengalin, isolated from this species, is a large protein of 72 kDa.5 It induces apoptosis in human leukemic cells in vitro. Bengalin also shows efficacy in a rat model of osteoporosis but also displays subacute cardiotoxicity.
