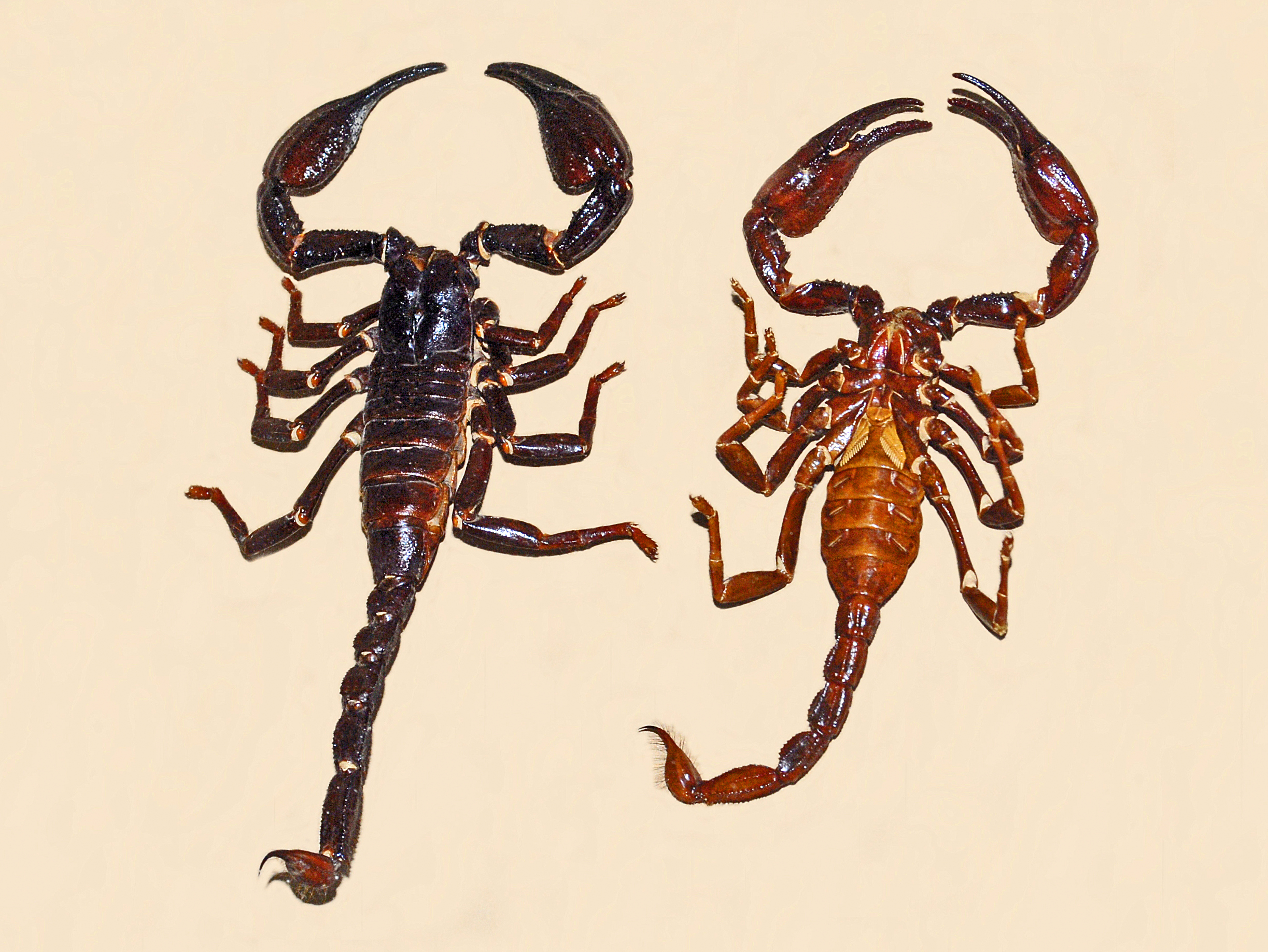
- Heterometrus longimanus from Borneo, Dorsal and ventral views

Scientific classification
- Domain: Eukaryota
- Kingdom: Animalia
- Phylum: Arthropoda
- Subphylum: Chelicerata
- Class: Arachnida
- Order: Scorpiones
- Family: Scorpionidae
- Genus: Heterometrus
- Species: H. longimanus

Binomial name
- Heterometrus longimanus (Herbst, 1800)

Synonyms
- Buthus costimanus C. L. Koch, 1837; Centrurus galbineus C. L. Koch, 1838; Palamnaeus angustimanus Thorell, 1876; Pandinus humilis Simon, 1877; Scorpio longimanus Herbst, 1800

= Heterometrus longimanus =

Species of scorpion

Heterometrus longimanus, the Asian forest scorpion, is a species of scorpions belonging to the family Scorpionidae.

== Description ==
Heterometrus longimanus can reach a length of 10–12 centimetres (3.9–4.7 in). Body color is uniformly black. These scorpions are viviparous.

== Distribution and habitat ==
This species is native to Southeast Asia (Malaysia, Indonesia, the Philippines, and Singapore), where it inhabits the humid tropical rainforests.
