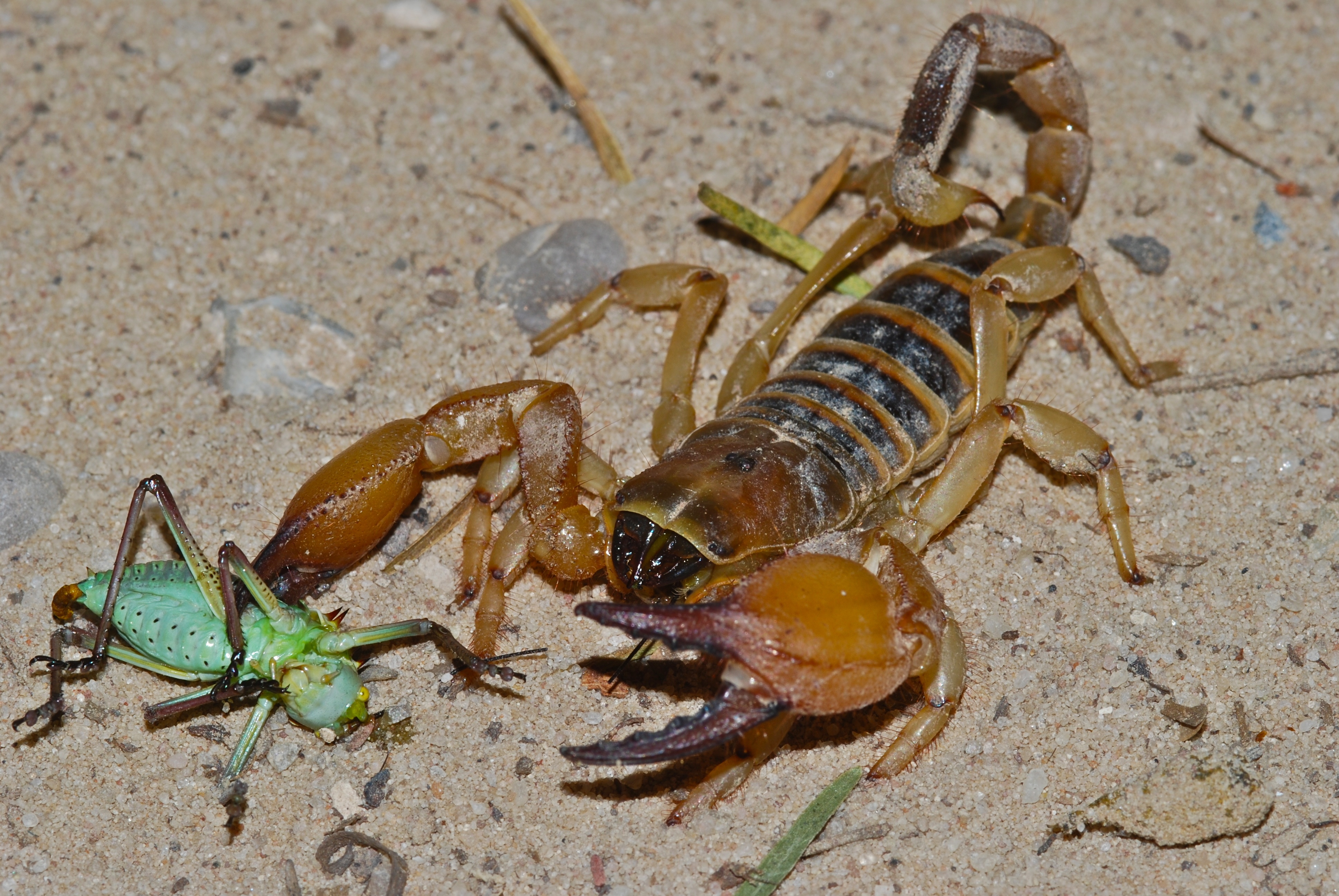

Scientific classification
- Domain: Eukaryota
- Kingdom: Animalia
- Phylum: Arthropoda
- Subphylum: Chelicerata
- Class: Arachnida
- Order: Scorpiones
- Family: Scorpionidae
- Genus: Opistophthalmus
- Species: O. wahlbergii

Binomial name
- Opistophthalmus wahlbergii (Thorell, 1876)

Synonyms
- Miaephonus wahlbergii Thorell, 1876; Opisthophthalmus gariepensis Purcell, 1901; Opisthophthalmus lundensis Monard, 1937; Opisthophthalmus nigrovesicalis Purcell, 1901; Opisthophthalmus robustus Newlands, 1969

= Opistophthalmus wahlbergii =

Species of scorpion

Opistophthalmus wahlbergii is a species of scorpion, in the family Scorpionidae, that is found in Botswana, Namibia and South Africa.
