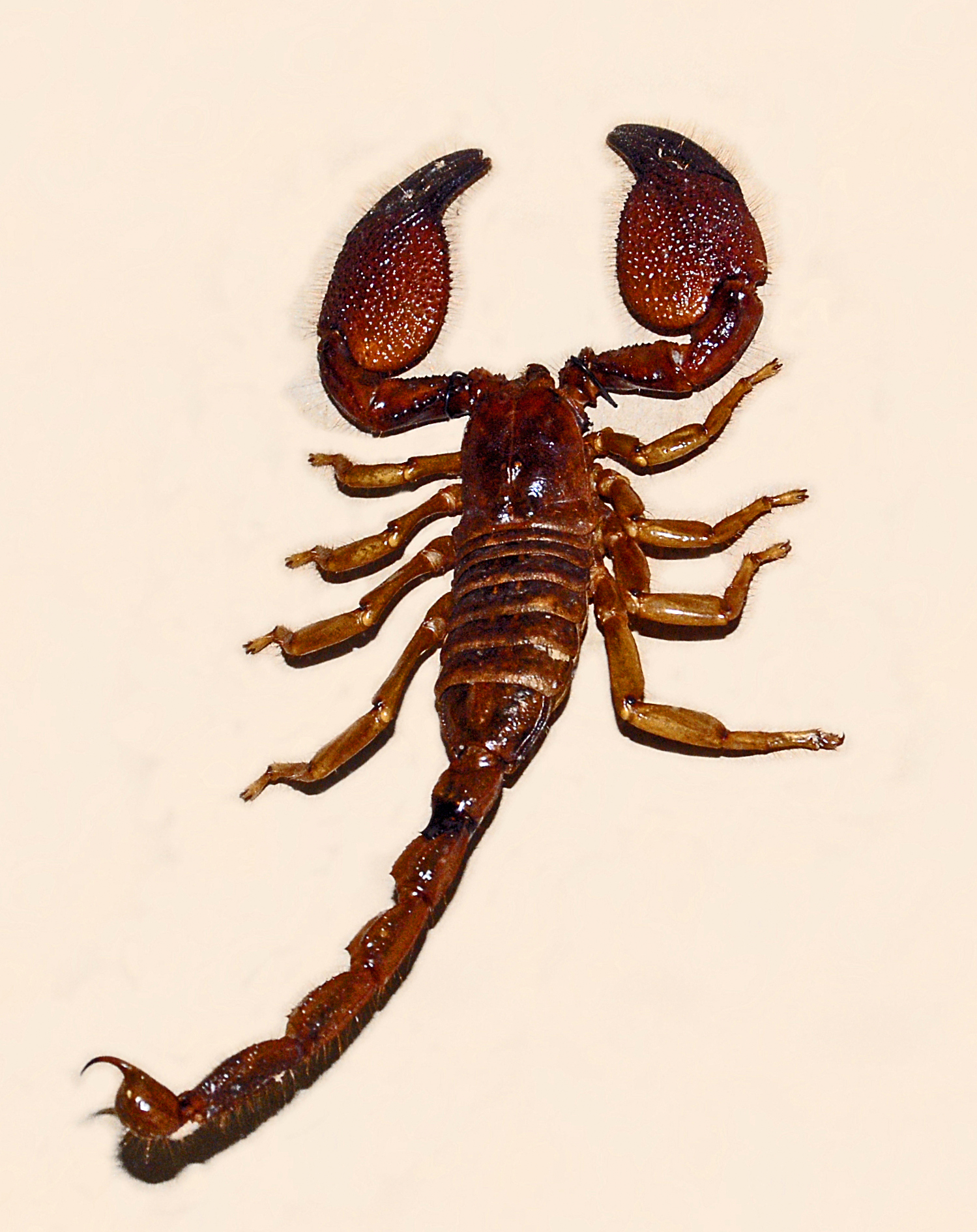
- Museum specimen of Pandinurus pallidus from Somalia

Scientific classification
- Domain: Eukaryota
- Kingdom: Animalia
- Phylum: Arthropoda
- Subphylum: Chelicerata
- Class: Arachnida
- Order: Scorpiones
- Family: Scorpionidae
- Genus: Pandinurus
- Species: P. pallidus

Binomial name
- Pandinurus pallidus (Kraepelin, 1894)

Synonyms
- Pandinurus pallidus

= Pandinurus pallidus =

Species of scorpion

Pandinurus pallidus, is a species of scorpion native to Africa.

== Distribution ==
This species is native to Somalia.
