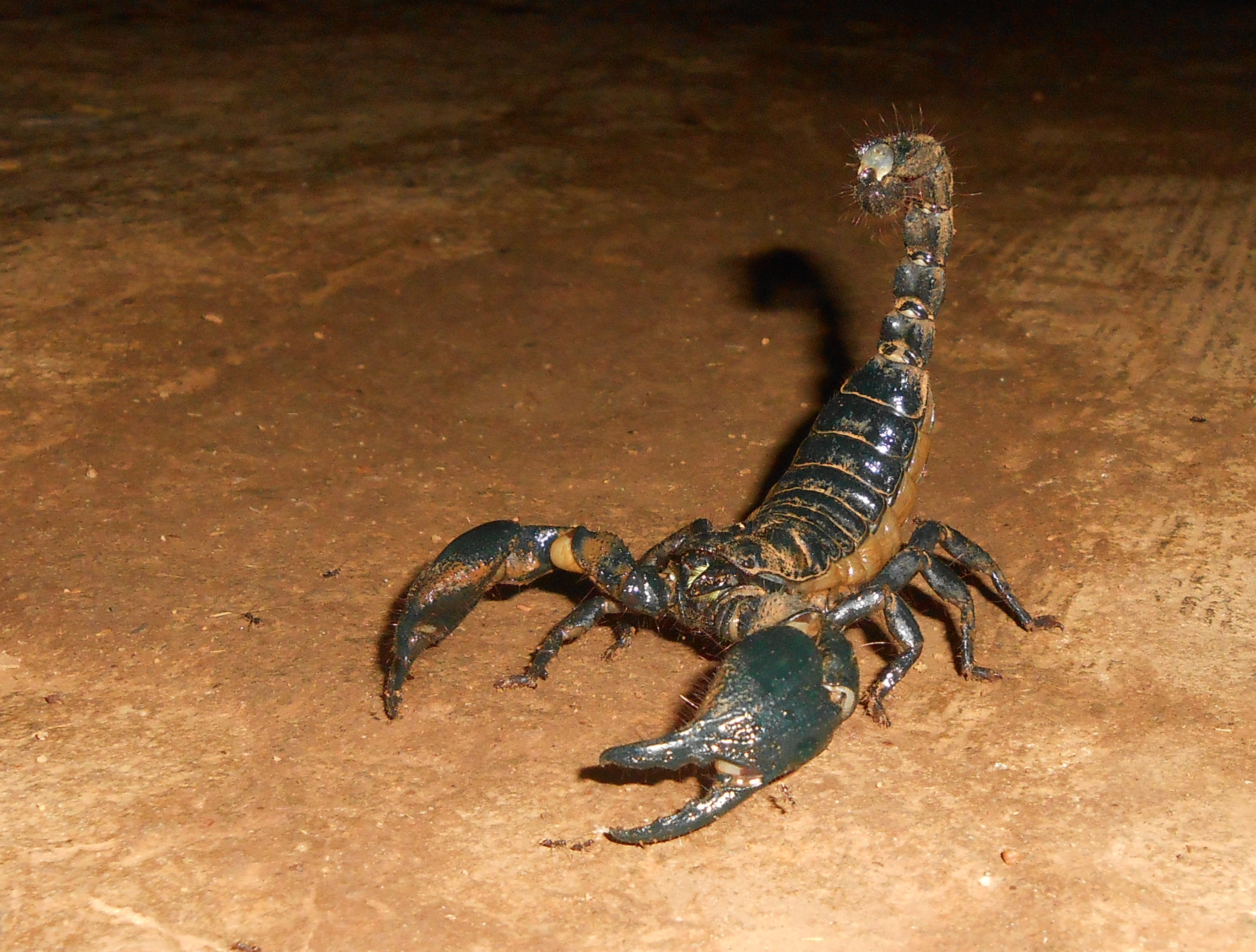
- A giant forest scorpion from the Western Ghats in Karnataka, India

Scientific classification
- Kingdom: Animalia
- Phylum: Arthropoda
- Subphylum: Chelicerata
- Class: Arachnida
- Order: Scorpiones
- Family: Scorpionidae
- Genus: Gigantometrus
- Species: G. swammerdami

Binomial name
- Gigantometrus swammerdami (Simon, 1872)

Synonyms
- Heterometrus swammerdami

= Gigantometrus swammerdami =

Species of arachnid

Gigantometrus swammerdami, commonly called the giant forest scorpion, is a scorpion belonging to the family Scorpionidae. It is native to India and is the world's largest scorpion species at 23 cm (9 inch) in length, and weighs 56 g (2.0 oz).

== Description ==
Their bodies have colors ranging from uniform reddish brown to reddish black. Juveniles are typically reddish with a yellow telson (stinger). They have 16 to 20 pectinal teeth. Its chela (claws or pincers) are strongly lobiform (lobe-shaped), and are completely covered by large rounded granulae (bumps). Its pedipalp patella (the joint that directly connects the pincers to the "arms" of the scorpion) lack a pronounced internal tubercle. Its carapace (outer shell of its back) is made up of smooth discs, while the edges and rear portions are textured. Its telson (which includes the stinger and the venom container) is bulbous, and the vesicle (the venom container of the telson) is longer than the aculeus (the stinger itself).

The neurosecretions of the species are largely identified.

== Ecology ==
Its venom is not usually lethal to humans because it has arguably evolved to kill its prey by crushing it with its pincers and not by venom. This giant forest scorpion has often been seen around tropical rainforests and other types of moderately warm climates.

Specimens are collected from inside degraded or semi-degraded termite mounds, tree holes and abandoned rat or crab holes in the bunds of agricultural fields. Males are usually active during the summer season from April to July. Solitary individuals come out of their dens during that period.
