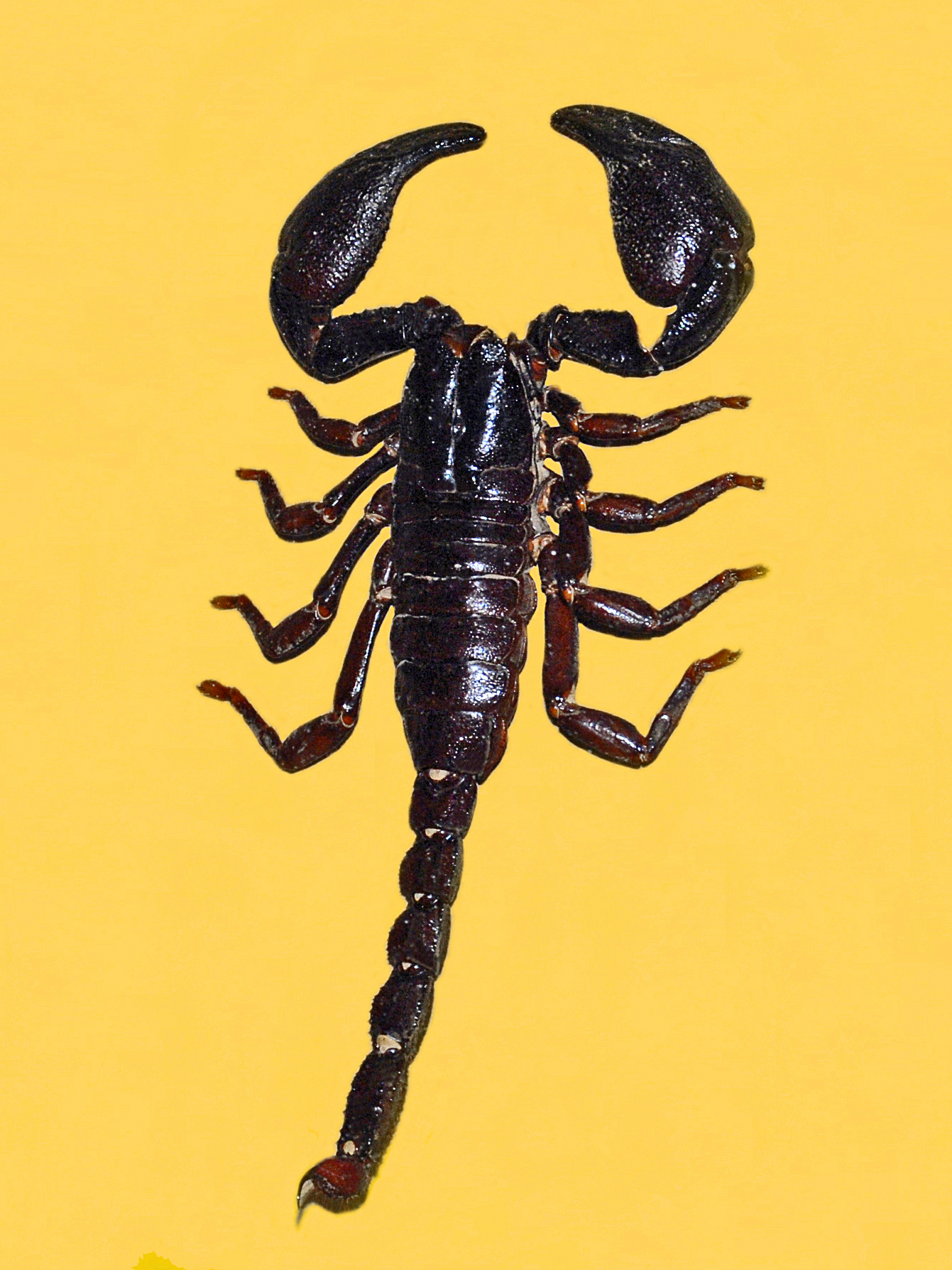
- Javanimetrus cyaneus from Java

Scientific classification
- Domain: Eukaryota
- Kingdom: Animalia
- Phylum: Arthropoda
- Subphylum: Chelicerata
- Class: Arachnida
- Order: Scorpiones
- Family: Scorpionidae
- Genus: Javanimetrus
- Species: J. cyaneus

Binomial name
- Javanimetrus cyaneus (C. L. Koch, 1836)

Synonyms
- Buthus cyaneus C. L. Koch, 1836; Buthus defensor C. L. Koch, 1837; Buthus heros C. L. Koch, 1837; Buthus reticulatus C. L. Koch, 1837; Buthus setosus C. L. Koch, 1841; Heterometrus cyaneus Simon, 1872; Heterometrus luzonenis Couzijn, 1981; Pandinus indicus Karsch, 1884

= Javanimetrus cyaneus =

Species of scorpion

Javanimetrus cyaneus, the Asian blue forest scorpion, is a species of scorpions belonging to the family Scorpionidae.

== Description ==
Javanimetrus cyaneus can reach a length of 12–15 cm (4.7–5.9 in). These scorpions are dark black, with blue reflections. The body is strongly granulated. This species is classified as harmful, as the sting causes moderate to severe pain, but without further consequences.

== Distribution and habitat ==
This species is native to Borneo, the Philippines, and Indonesia. It can be found in tropical rainforests and wetland forests, usually under stones or fallen trees.
