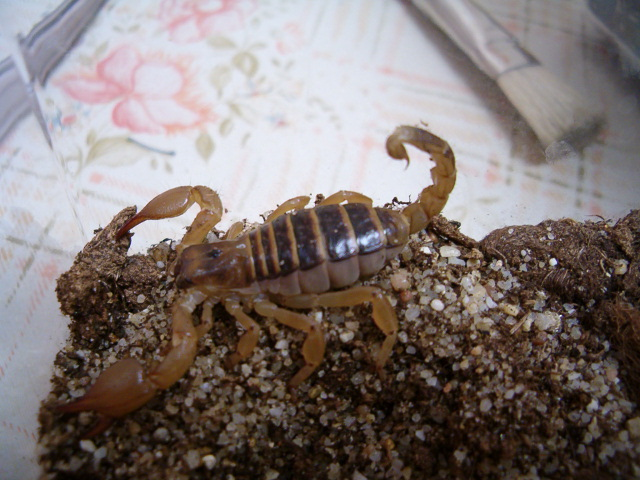

Scientific classification
- Domain: Eukaryota
- Kingdom: Animalia
- Phylum: Arthropoda
- Subphylum: Chelicerata
- Class: Arachnida
- Order: Scorpiones
- Family: Scorpionidae
- Genus: Opistophthalmus
- Species: O. boehmi

Binomial name
- Opistophthalmus boehmi (Kraepelin, 1896)

= Opistophthalmus boehmi =

Species of scorpion

Opistophthalmus boehmi, the yellow forest scorpion, is a small (around 5 cm - 2 in) scorpion native to southern Africa. It is a burrowing scorpion which can create intricate tunnels and spend days buried at the bottom of its lair.

== Behavior ==
This scorpion is quite nervous and can display defensively. It should not be kept communally, as fights and cannibalism are frequent. The toxicity of its venom is usually deemed to be low, though its sting can be quite painful.

== See also ==
- Scorpion
- Arachnids
