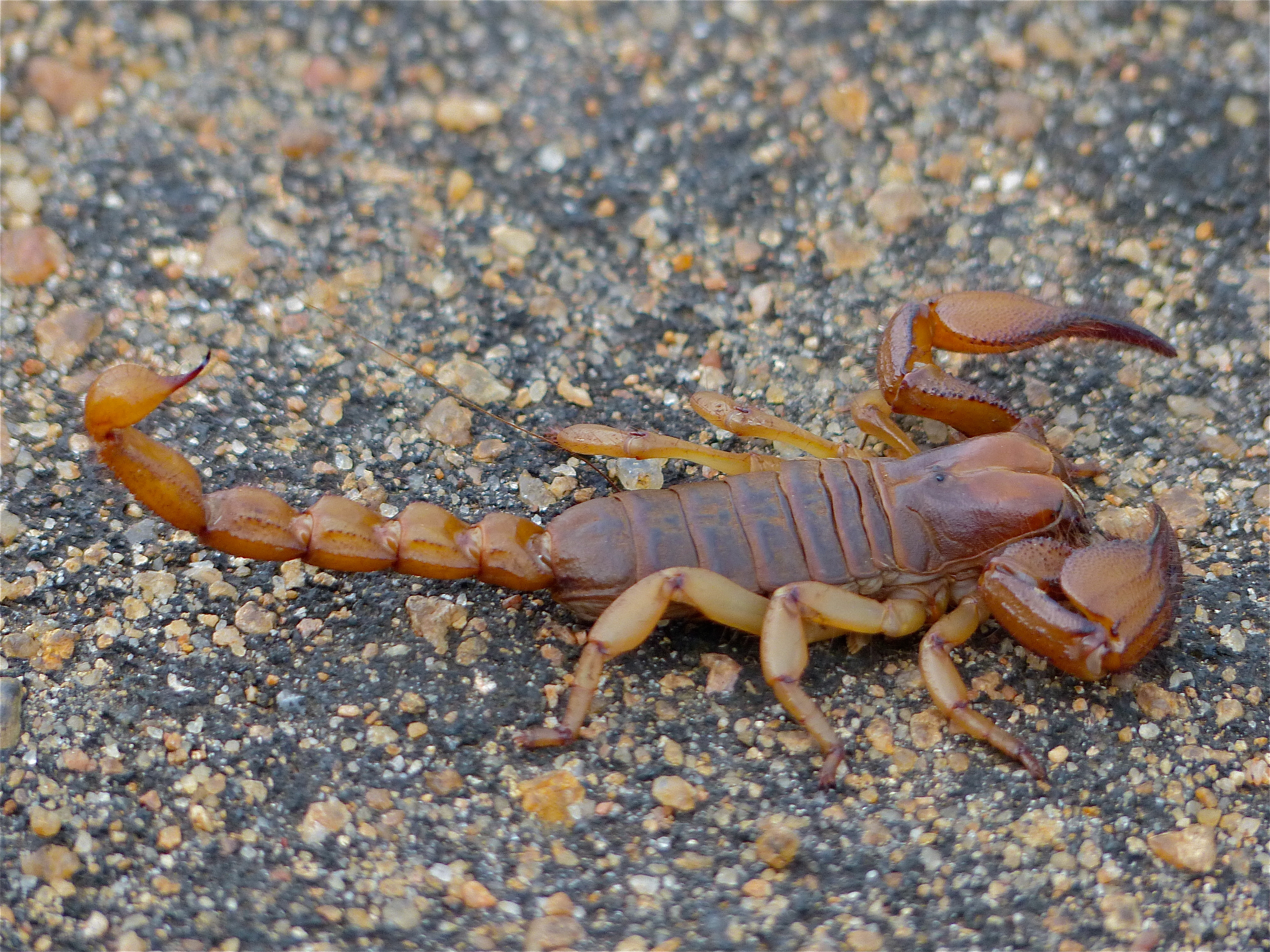

Scientific classification
- Domain: Eukaryota
- Kingdom: Animalia
- Phylum: Arthropoda
- Subphylum: Chelicerata
- Class: Arachnida
- Order: Scorpiones
- Family: Scorpionidae
- Genus: Opistophthalmus
- Species: O. glabrifrons

Binomial name
- Opistophthalmus glabrifrons (Peters, 1861)

= Opistophthalmus glabrifrons =

Species of scorpion

Opistophalmus glabrifrons (commonly known as the shiny burrow scorpion or the yellow-legged burrowing scorpion) is a large (adult size: 11–15 cm) species of burrowing scorpion found in Southern and Eastern Africa.
