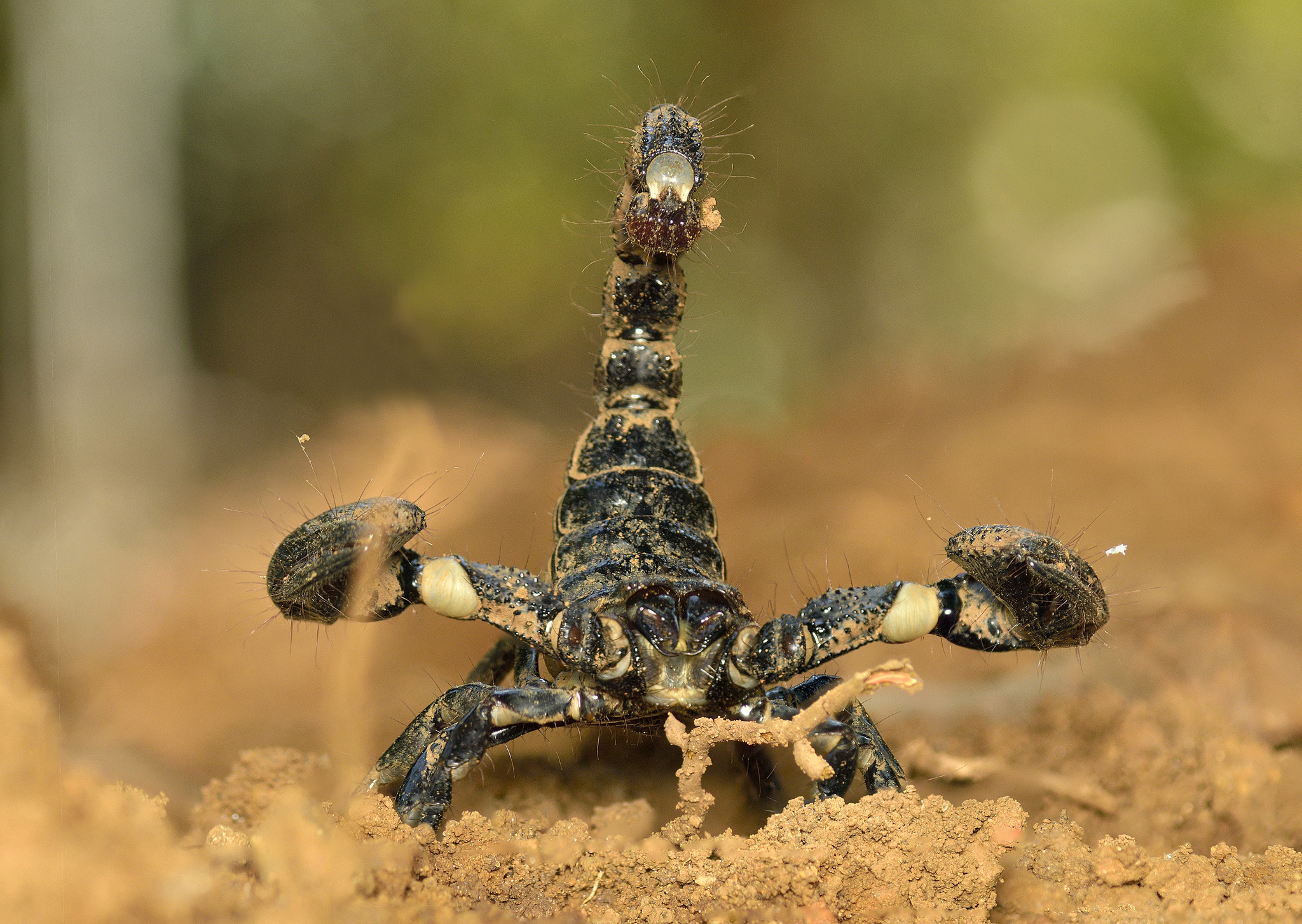
- From Kuttikkad, Kerala, India.

Scientific classification
- Kingdom: Animalia
- Phylum: Arthropoda
- Subphylum: Chelicerata
- Class: Arachnida
- Order: Scorpiones
- Family: Scorpionidae
- Genus: Sahyadrimetrus
- Species: S. scaber

Binomial name
- Sahyadrimetrus scaber (Thorell, 1876)

Synonyms
- Scorpio leioderma Dufour, 1856; Pandinus scaber (Thorell, 1876); Heterometrus scaber (Thorell, 1876); Heterometrus malapuramensis (Tikader & Bastawade, 1983); Heterometrus rolciki (Kovařík, 2004)

= Sahyadrimetrus scaber =

Species of arachnid

Sahyadrimetrus scaber is a species of scorpion endemic to India. Its common name is South Indian scorpion.

== Description ==
Sahyadrimetrus scaber is distinguished by its vaulted carapace with steep lateral surfaces, converging margins posteriorly, granular interocular surface, granular posterolateral surfaces in females, short pedipalps in adult males, absence of dorsomedian patella carina in females, smooth intercarinal surfaces of chela manus in females, and specific setae morphology on leg basitarsi. It also exhibits granular mesosomal tergites and smooth ventral intercarinal surfaces of metasomal segment IV. Dorsolateral carinae of metasomal segment V are distinct and continuous.

== Range ==
Sahyadrimetrus scaber is endemic to southern India. Specifically it has been recorded in Kerala, Karnataka and Goa.

== Threats ==
Sahyadrimetrus scaber along with S.kanarensis are found to be occasionally harvested for exotic pet trade.

== Venom ==
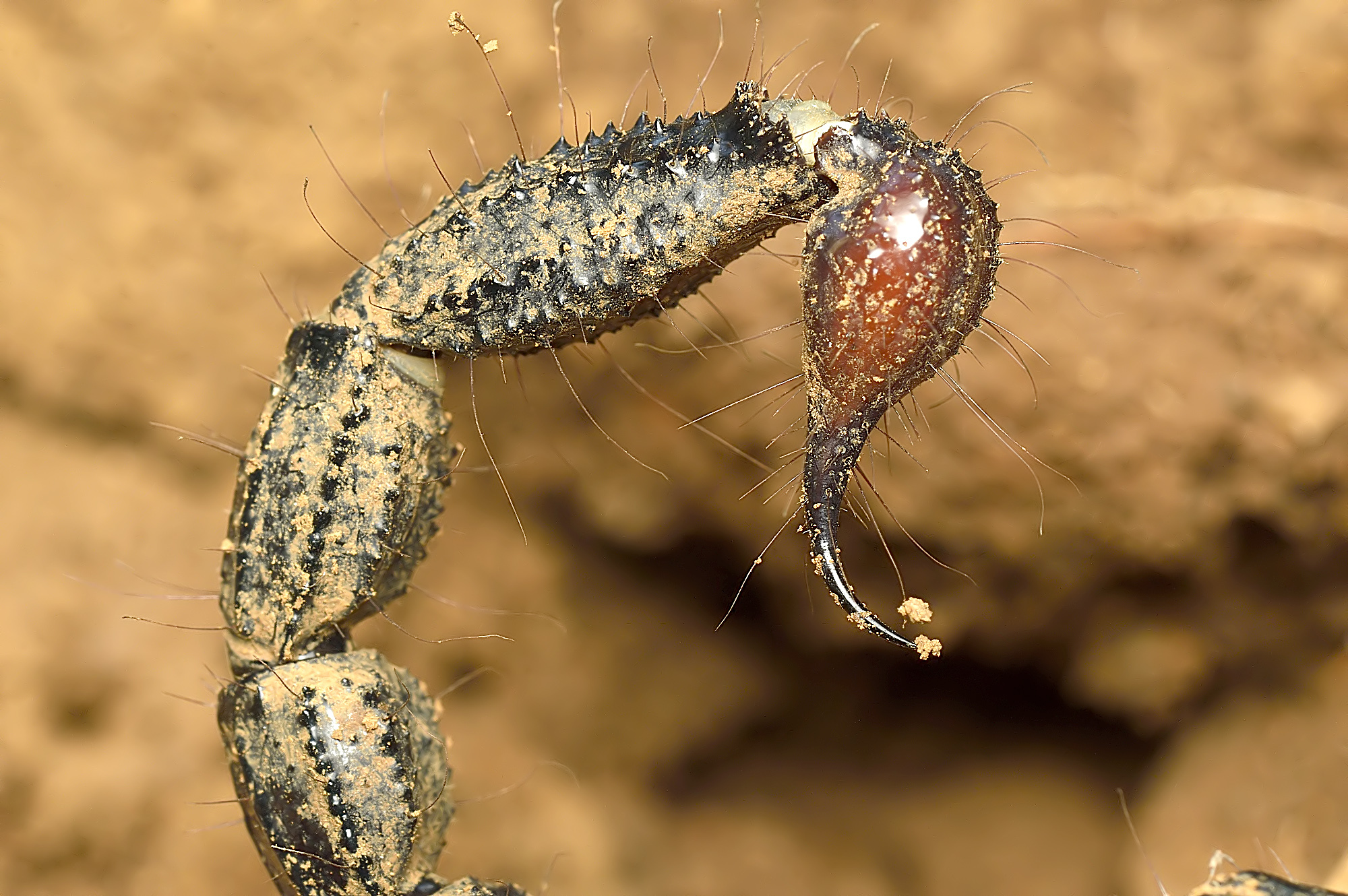
Sting of H.scaber.

Sahyadrimetrus scaber venom exhibits low toxicity compared to other scorpion species. Its venom primarily causes local effects, unlike more potent neurotoxins found in species like Tityus and Centruroides. S. scaber venom contains various enzymes like acid phosphatase and ribonuclease, but lacks proteolytic activity. It also contains indole compounds, including 5-hydroxytryptamine, contributing to intense local pain. When administered, sublethal doses induce hyperglycemia in rabbits possibly due to increased adrenaline production. The toxic protein isolated from S.scaber venom is a glycoprotein with no enzyme activity, causing mortality in rats at a dose of 0.72 mg/kg when intravenously administered. However, it is less toxic compared to the venom of more dangerous scorpion species. There is ongoing research to understand its pharmacological actions. S.scaber is venomous to humans but poses lower risk compared to other venomous scorpions.
