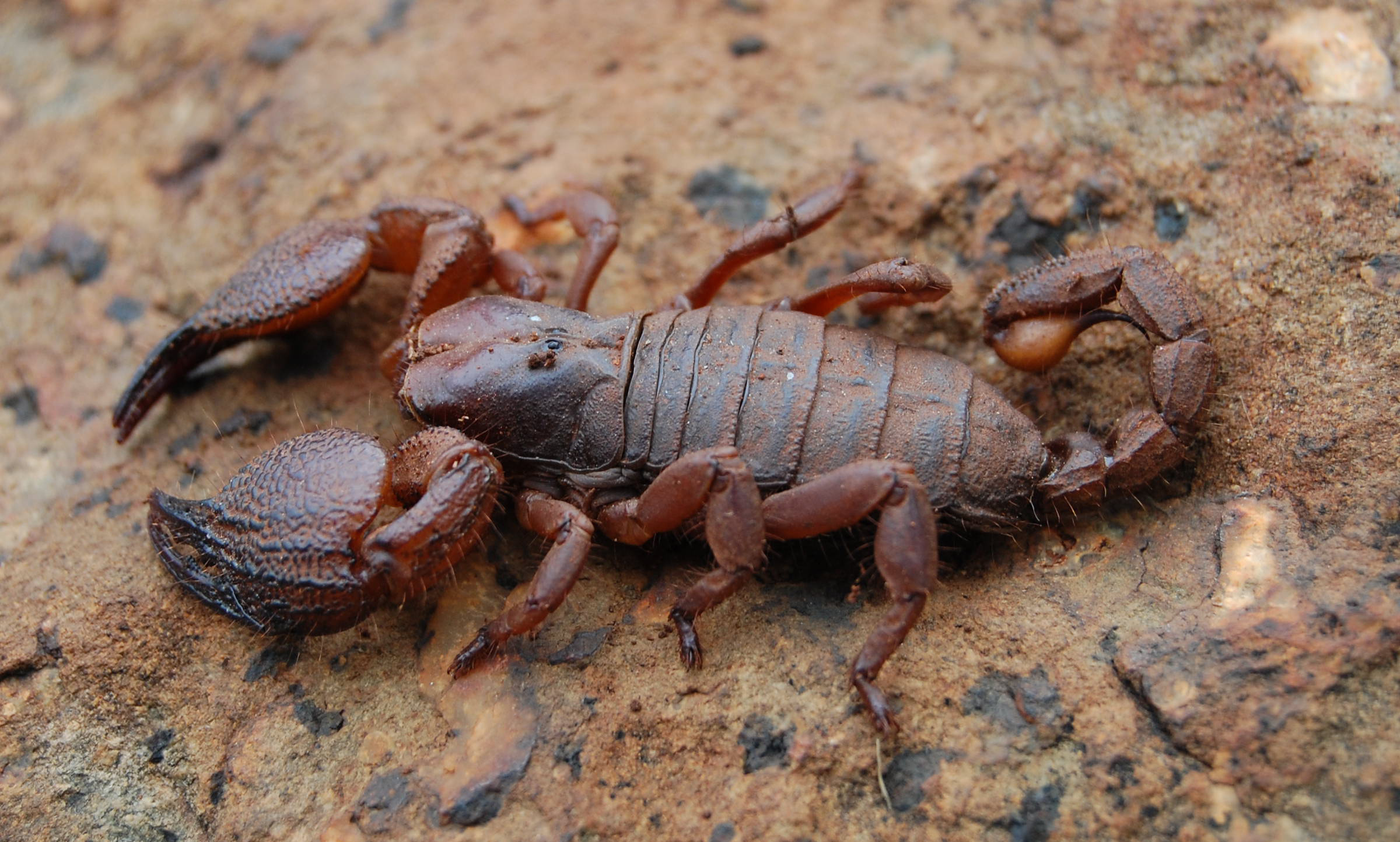

Scientific classification
- Domain: Eukaryota
- Kingdom: Animalia
- Phylum: Arthropoda
- Subphylum: Chelicerata
- Class: Arachnida
- Order: Scorpiones
- Family: Scorpionidae
- Genus: Opistophthalmus
- Species: O. pugnax

Binomial name
- Opistophthalmus pugnax Thorell, 1876

= Opistophthalmus pugnax =

Species of scorpion

The pugnacious burrowing scorpion (Opistophthalmus pugnax) is a species of South African scorpion.

== Description ==
These muddy-looking scorpions are characterized by corrugations on the last sternite, stiff hairs (setae), and highly recurved tarsal claws. Males have corrugations on the last two sternites. They grow up to 70 mm in length.

== Distribution and habitat ==
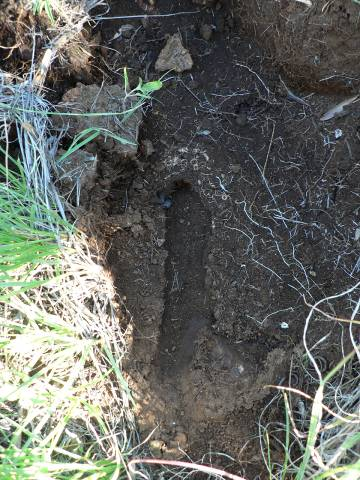
A burrow of O. pugnax

A fan-shaped burrow with an enlarged part for resting or consuming prey is constructed under rocks and other surface debris. It is a very common species on rocky outcrops and ridges in the north-central Free State and Gauteng provinces of South Africa.

== Behaviour ==
Despite its species name, it is not particularly aggressive and very rarely enters houses. The female gives birth to litters of up to 25.
