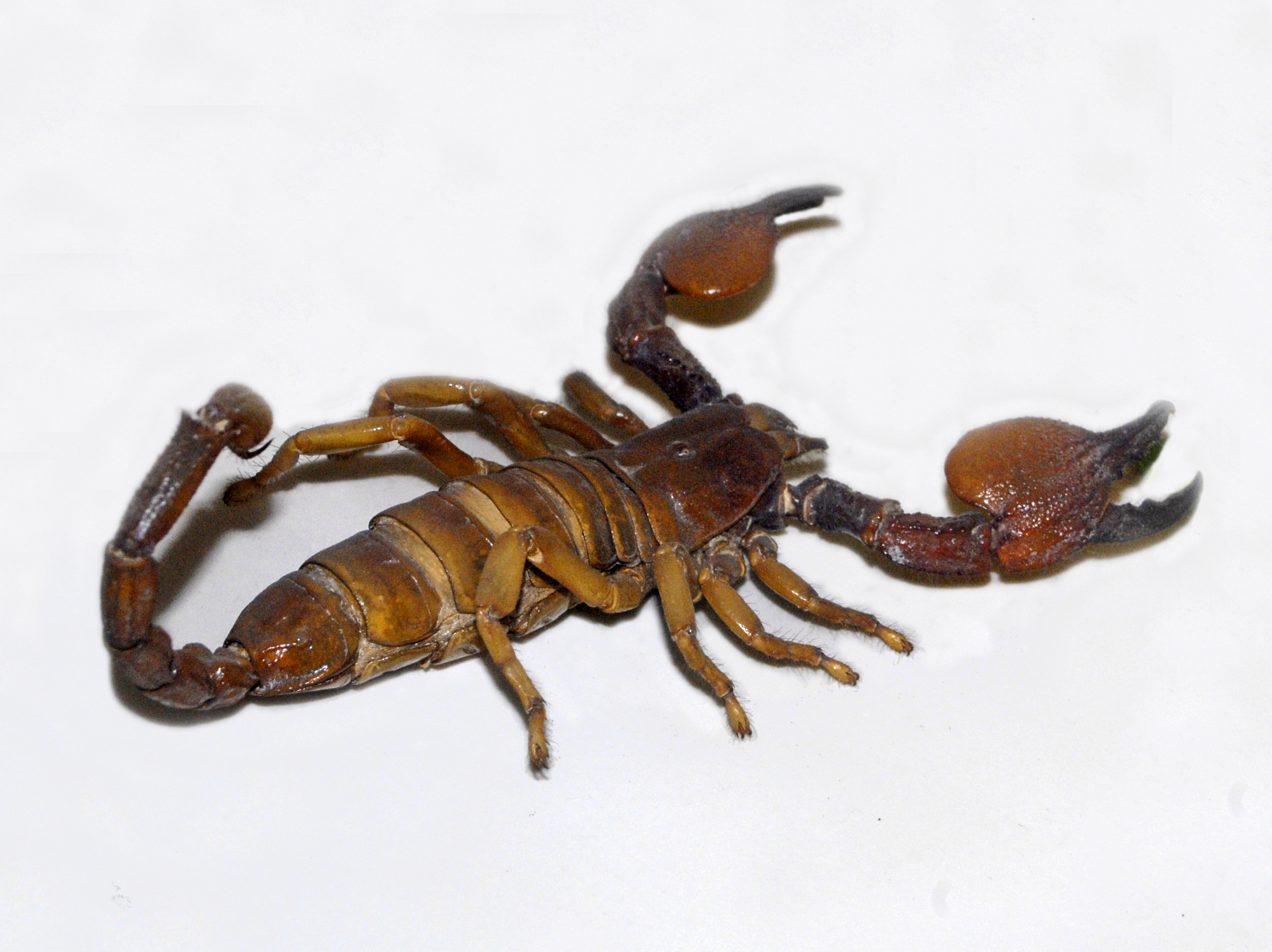
- Museum specimen of Pandiborellius magrettii from Ethiopia

Scientific classification
- Domain: Eukaryota
- Kingdom: Animalia
- Phylum: Arthropoda
- Subphylum: Chelicerata
- Class: Arachnida
- Order: Scorpiones
- Family: Scorpionidae
- Genus: Pandiborellius
- Species: P. magrettii

Binomial name
- Pandiborellius magrettii (Borelli, 1901)

Synonyms
- Pandinus magrettii Borelli, 1901; Brotheas hirsutus L. Koch, 1875; Scorpio africanus subtypicus Kraepelin, 1894

= Pandiborellius magrettii =

Species of scorpion

Pandiborellius magrettii is a species of scorpion native to Africa.

== Description ==
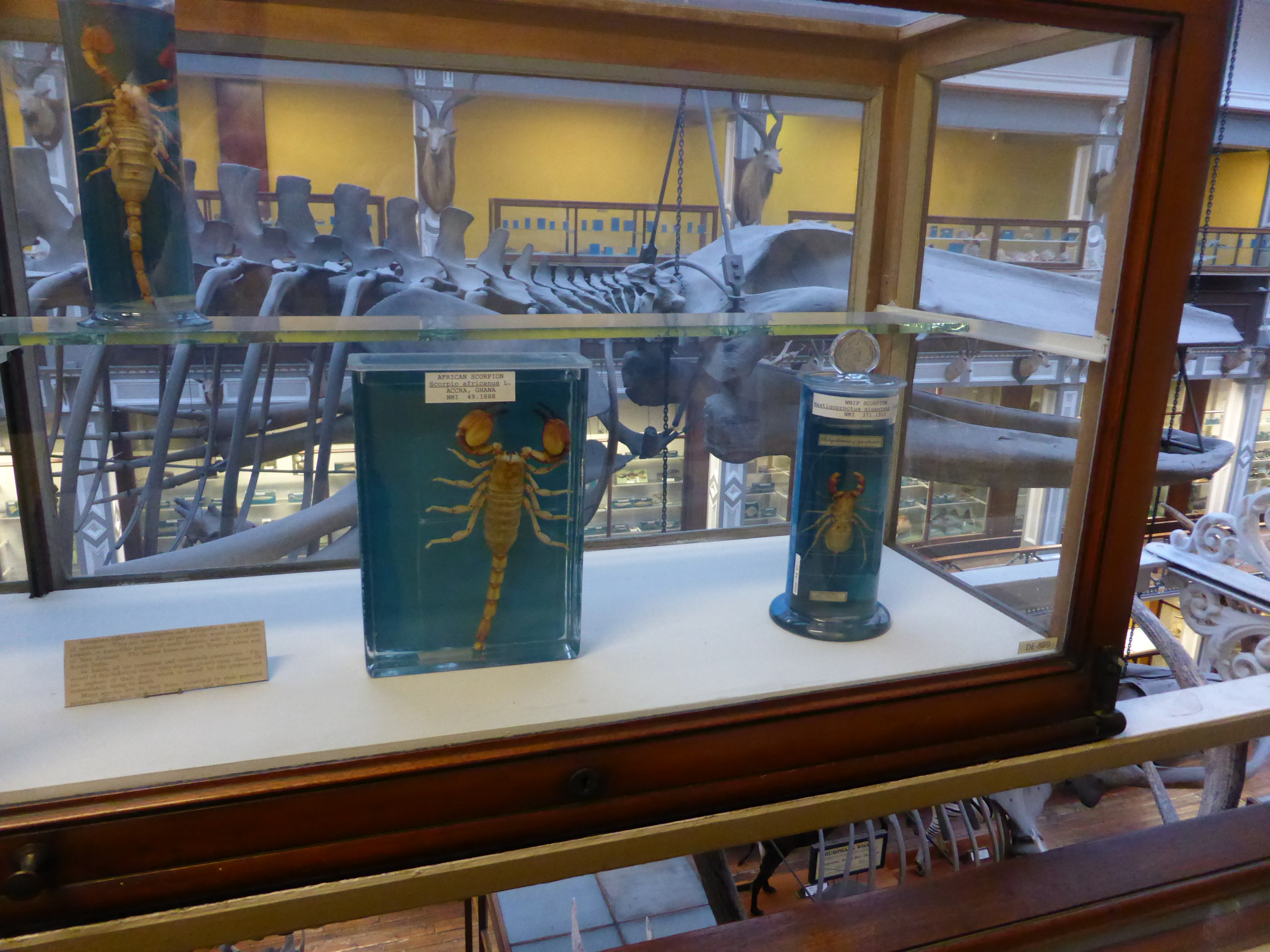
Scorpio africanus, 1888 specimen, in Natural History Museum (Ireland)

Pandiborellius magrettii can reach a total length of 105–113 millimetres (4.1–4.4 in), with a cephalothorax of about 16 millimetres (0.63 in) and a tail of about 58 millimetres (2.3 in). Body and tail are dark brown, with dark olive-brown at the sides of the cephalothorax. The large pincers are dark brown. Legs, known as the metasomaa, are yellowish. Dorsal keels on fourth metasomal segments lack discrete denticles.

== Distribution ==
This species is native to Eritrea, Ethiopia, Somalia and Sudan.
