= Sahyadri (disambiguation) =

Sahyadri is a mountain range along the western side of India in the Western Ghats. It may also refer to:

== Places ==
- Sahyadri Tiger Reserve, wildlife Sanctuary in Maharashtra, India
- Sahyadri Hospitals, hospital chain in Maharashtra, Inda
- Sahyadri Science College

== Species ==
- Sahyadria, genus of fishes
- Sahyadris forest rat, species of rodent
- Sahyadria chalakkudiensis, species of fish
- Sahyadrimetrus kanarensis, species of scorpion
- Denison barb, species of fish

== Others ==
- DD Sahyadri, an Indian television network
- INS Sahyadri (F49), a Shivalik class frigate
- Sahyadri Express, train in India
- Sahyadri Khanda, a division of the ancient Indian text Skanda Purana describing the mountain range
