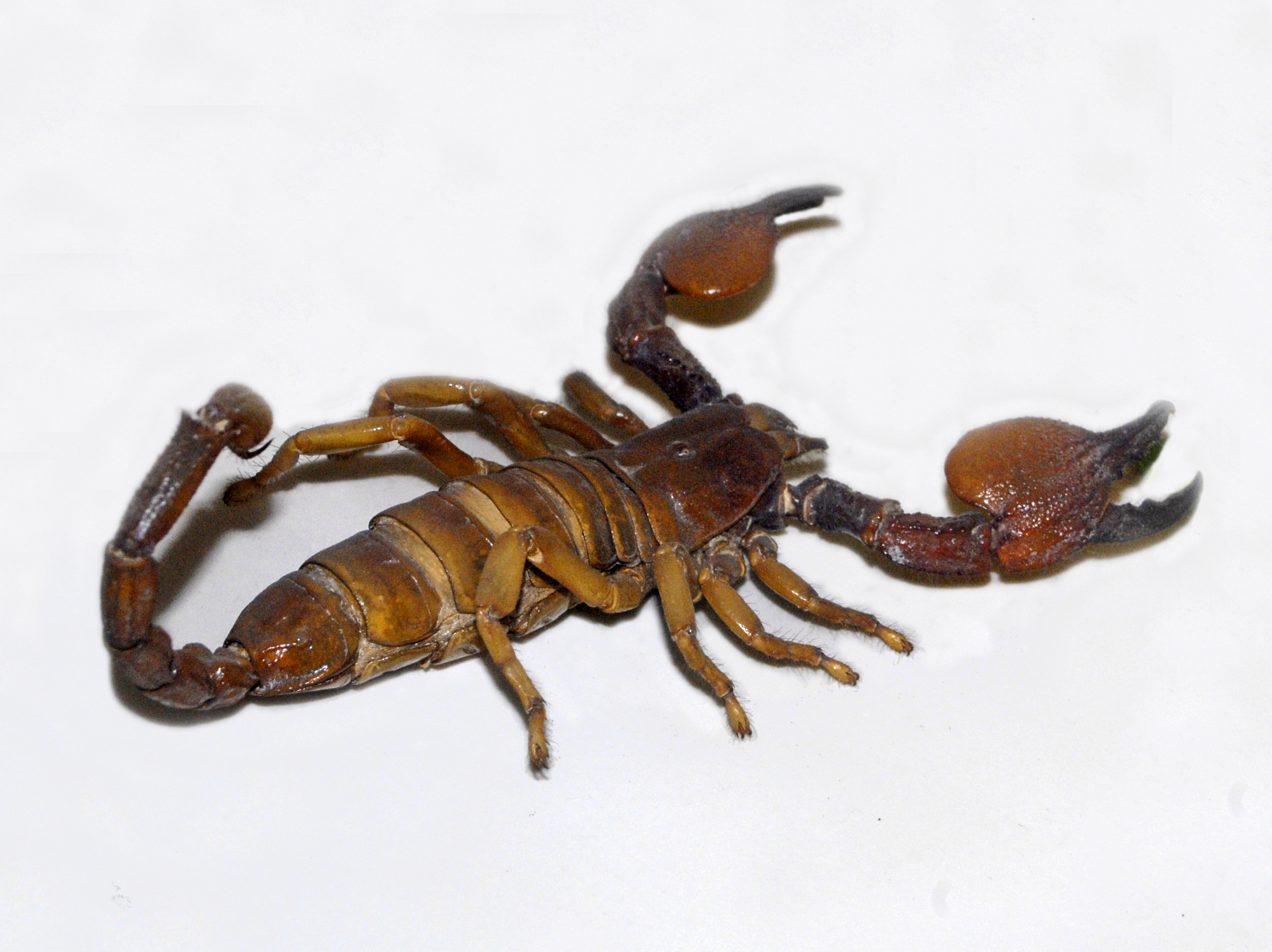
- Pandiborellius magretti

Scientific classification
- Kingdom: Animalia
- Phylum: Arthropoda
- Subphylum: Chelicerata
- Class: Arachnida
- Order: Scorpiones
- Family: Scorpionidae
- Genus: Pandiborellius; Rossi (2015)

= Pandiborellius =

Genus of Scorpionidae

Pandiborellius is a genus of the Scorpionidae family.

== Species ==
- Pandiborellius arabicus
- Pandiborellius awashensis
- Pandiborellius igdu
- Pandiborellius insularis
- Pandiborellius lanzai
- Pandiborellius magrettii
- Pandiborellius meidensis
- Pandiborellius nistriae
- Pandiborellius percivali
- Pandiborellius somalilandus
