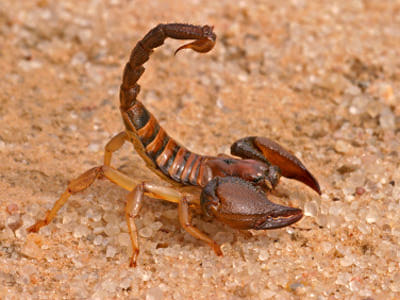

Scientific classification
- Domain: Eukaryota
- Kingdom: Animalia
- Phylum: Arthropoda
- Subphylum: Chelicerata
- Class: Arachnida
- Order: Scorpiones
- Family: Scorpionidae
- Genus: Opistophthalmus
- Species: O. carinatus

Binomial name
- Opistophthalmus carinatus (Peters, 1861)

= Opistophthalmus carinatus =

Robust burrowing scorpion

Species of scorpion

The robust burrowing scorpion (Opistophthalmus carinatus) is a widespread species of scorpion in the drier regions of southern Africa. It is a burrowing scorpion, which often places its burrow beside a large rock. Compared to others of its genus, it has a particularly sturdy body with large pinchers.
