= Sahyadrimetrus =

- Sahyadrimetrus scaber

Scientific classification
- Kingdom: Animalia
- Phylum: Arthropoda
- Subphylum: Chelicerata
- Class: Arachnida
- Order: Scorpiones
- Family: Scorpionidae
- Genus: Sahyadrimetrus; Prendini & Loria, 2020

Genus of scorpions

Sahyadrimetrus is a genus of scorpions commonly known as the Indian forest scorpions in the family Scorpionidae. It contains six species.

== Species ==
Sahyadrimetrus contains the following species:

- Sahyadrimetrus barberi (Pocock, 1900)
- Sahyadrimetrus kanarensis (Pocock, 1900)
- Sahyadrimetrus mathewi Prendini & Loria, 2020
- Sahyadrimetrus rugosus (Couzijn, 1981)
- Sahyadrimetrus scaber (Thorell, 1876)
- Sahyadrimetrus tikaderi Prendini & Loria, 2020
