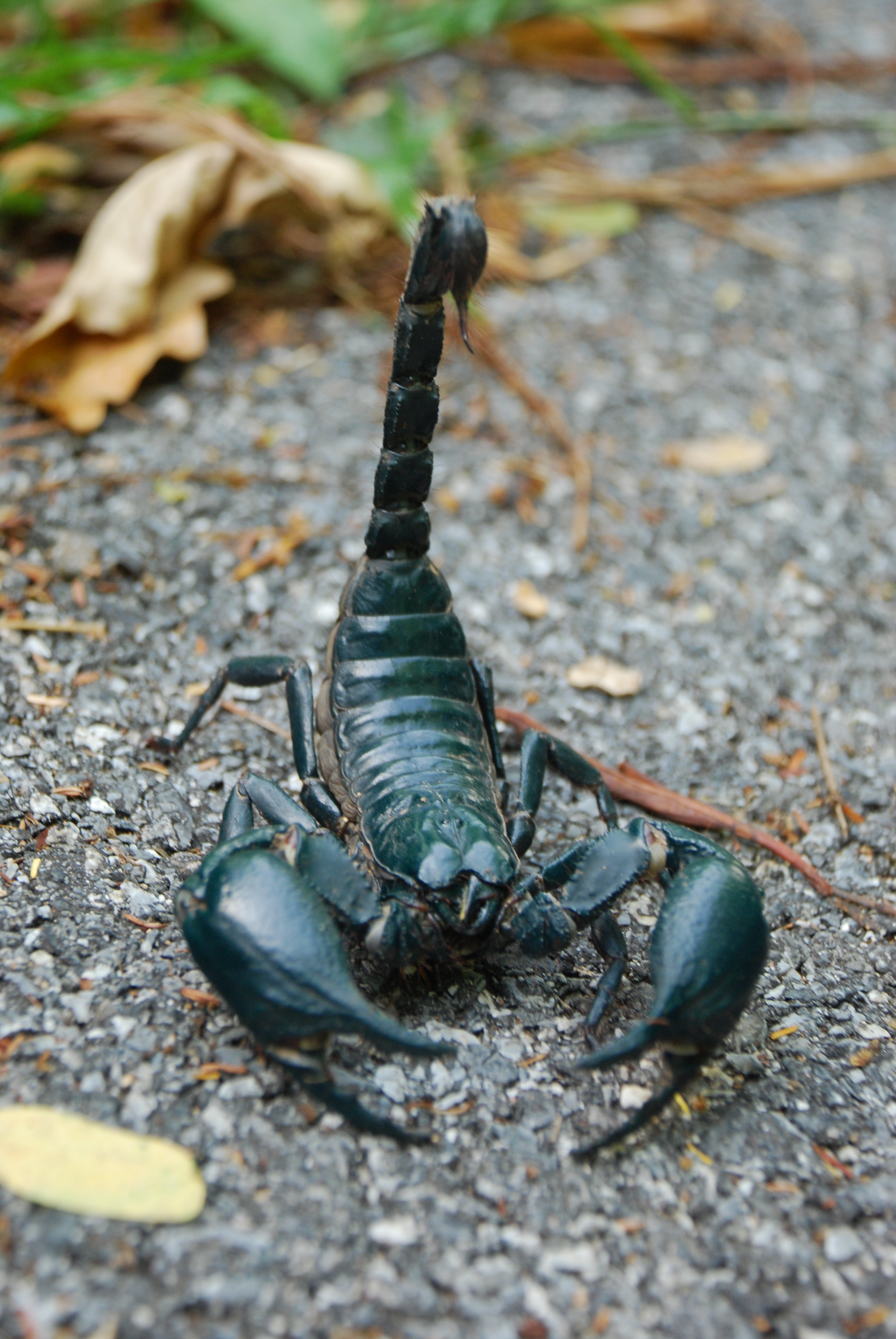

Scientific classification
- Kingdom: Animalia
- Phylum: Arthropoda
- Subphylum: Chelicerata
- Class: Arachnida
- Order: Scorpiones
- Family: Scorpionidae
- Genus: Heterometrus
- Species: H. laoticus

Binomial name
- Heterometrus laoticus Couzijn, 1981

= Heterometrus laoticus =

Species of scorpion

Heterometrus laoticus or Vietnam forest scorpion, is a scorpion species found in peaty areas of Vietnam and Laos. They can reach lengths of 12 cm (4.7 in). They are a communal species, but cannibalism has been known to occur, and if caught, they can be extremely violent even towards their own kind.

== Lethality ==
Rather than being a lethal toxin, the giant scorpion's venom is paralytic. The venom is distilled into medicines against various kinds of microorganisms. It exhibits good results in disc diffusion assay for Bacillus subtilis, Klebsiella pneumoniae, Pseudomonas aeruginosa, and Staphylococcus aureus, among others.

== As food ==
The scorpion is farmed for consumption as a novelty food in Vietnam. They are also used to make snake wine (scorpion wine).
