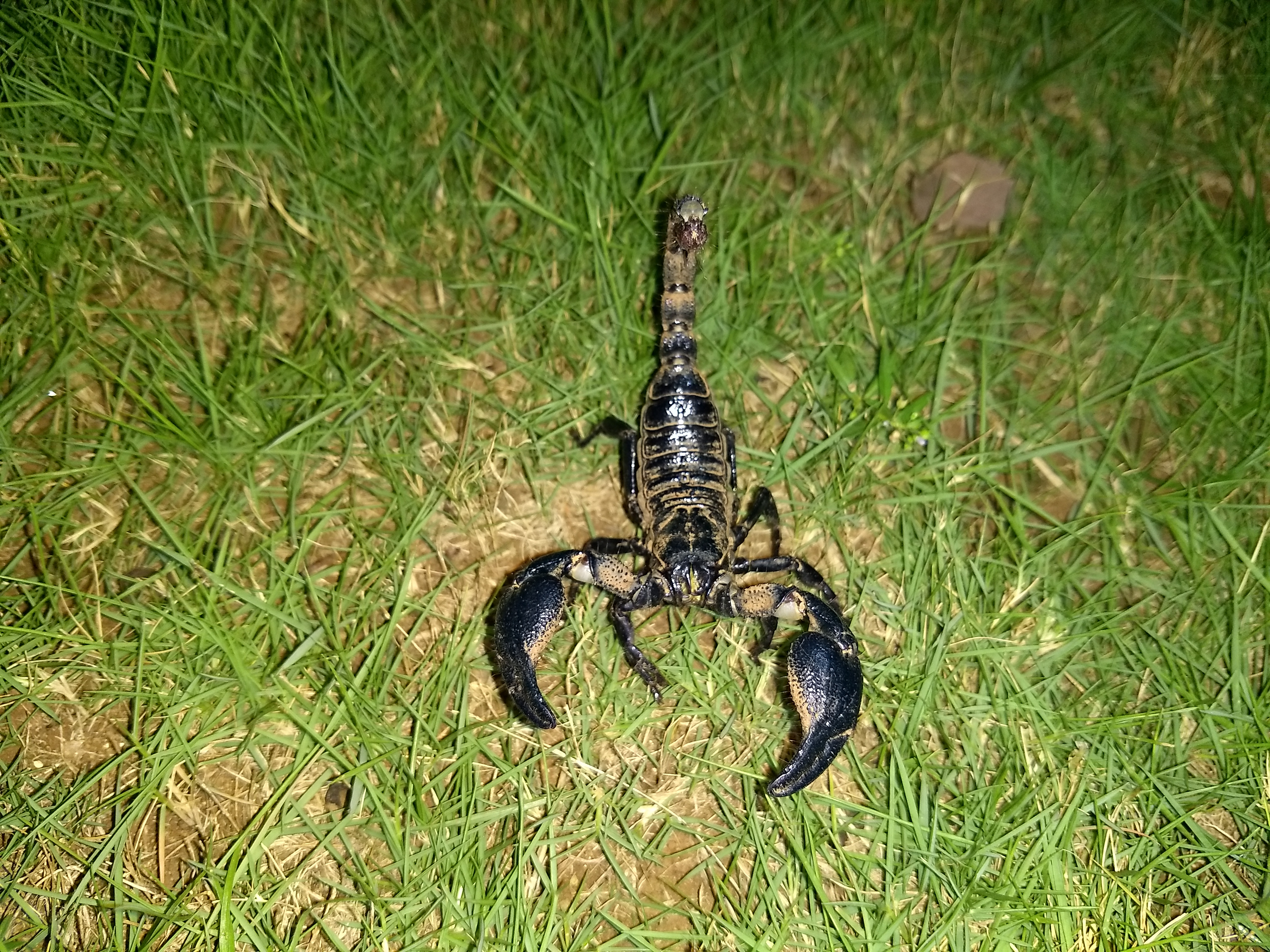
- Deccanometrus bengalensis

Scientific classification
- Domain: Eukaryota
- Kingdom: Animalia
- Phylum: Arthropoda
- Subphylum: Chelicerata
- Class: Arachnida
- Order: Scorpiones
- Family: Scorpionidae
- Genus: Deccanometrus; Prendini & Loria, 2020

Species
- Deccanometrus bengalensis (C. L. Koch, 1841); Deccanometrus latimanus (Pocock, 1894); Deccanometrus liurus (Pocock, 1897); Deccanometrus obscurus (Couzijn, 1981); Deccanometrus phipsoni (Pocock, 1893); Deccanometrus ubicki (Kovarik, 2004); Deccanometrus xanthopus (Pocock, 1897)

= Deccanometrus =

Genus of arachnids

Deccanometrus is a genus of burrowing scorpions or pale-legged scorpions in the family Scorpionidae.
