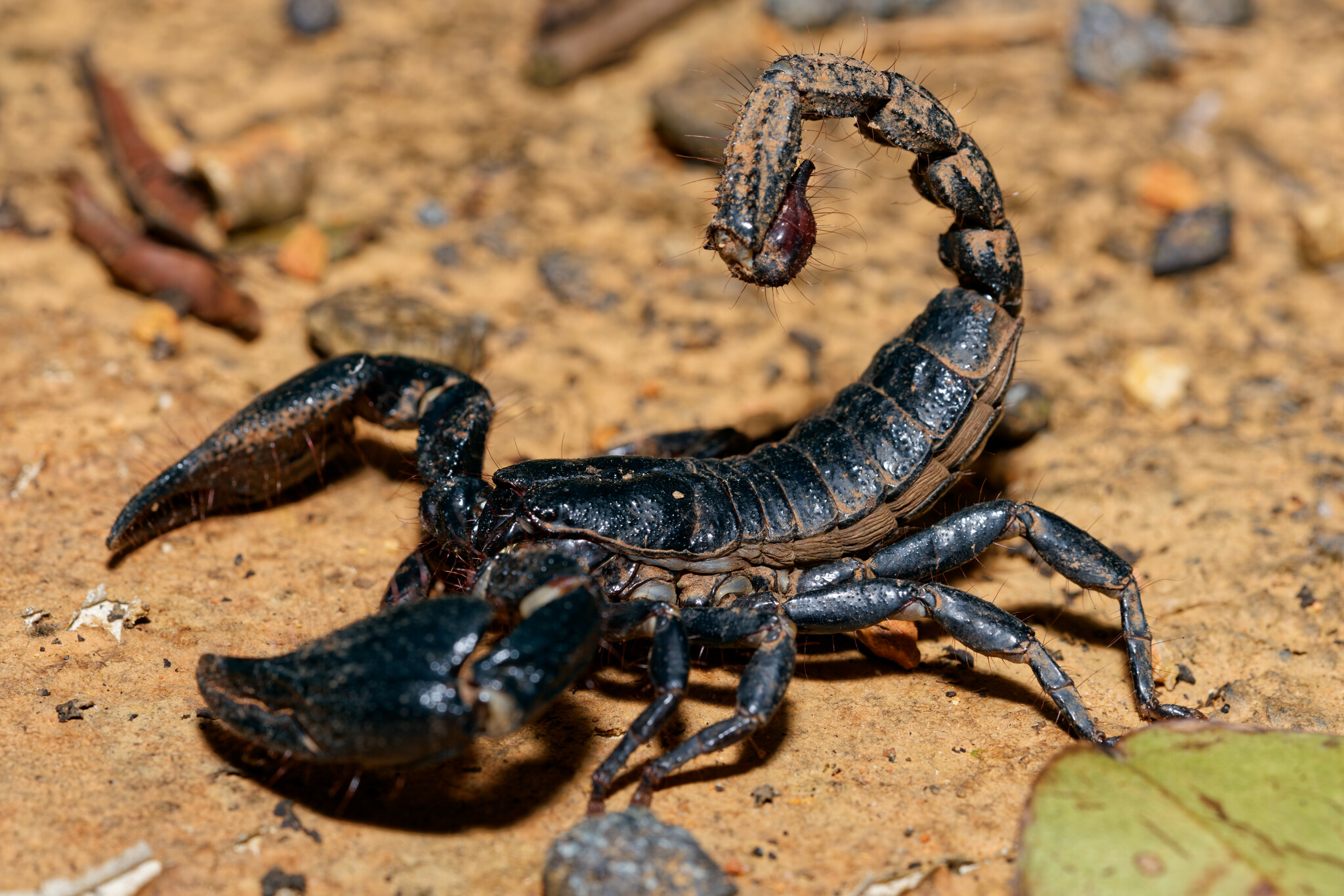

Scientific classification
- Kingdom: Animalia
- Phylum: Arthropoda
- Subphylum: Chelicerata
- Class: Arachnida
- Order: Scorpiones
- Family: Scorpionidae
- Genus: Sahyadrimetrus
- Species: S. kanarensis

Binomial name
- Sahyadrimetrus kanarensis (Pocock, 1900)

= Sahyadrimetrus kanarensis =

Species of scorpion

Sahyadrimetrus kanarensis is a scorpion species found in Karnataka, India. It is mostly found in the Western Ghats, which is a biodiversity hotspot and a World Heritage Site. It is an endangered species with habitat destruction as the reason for its dwindling numbers.
