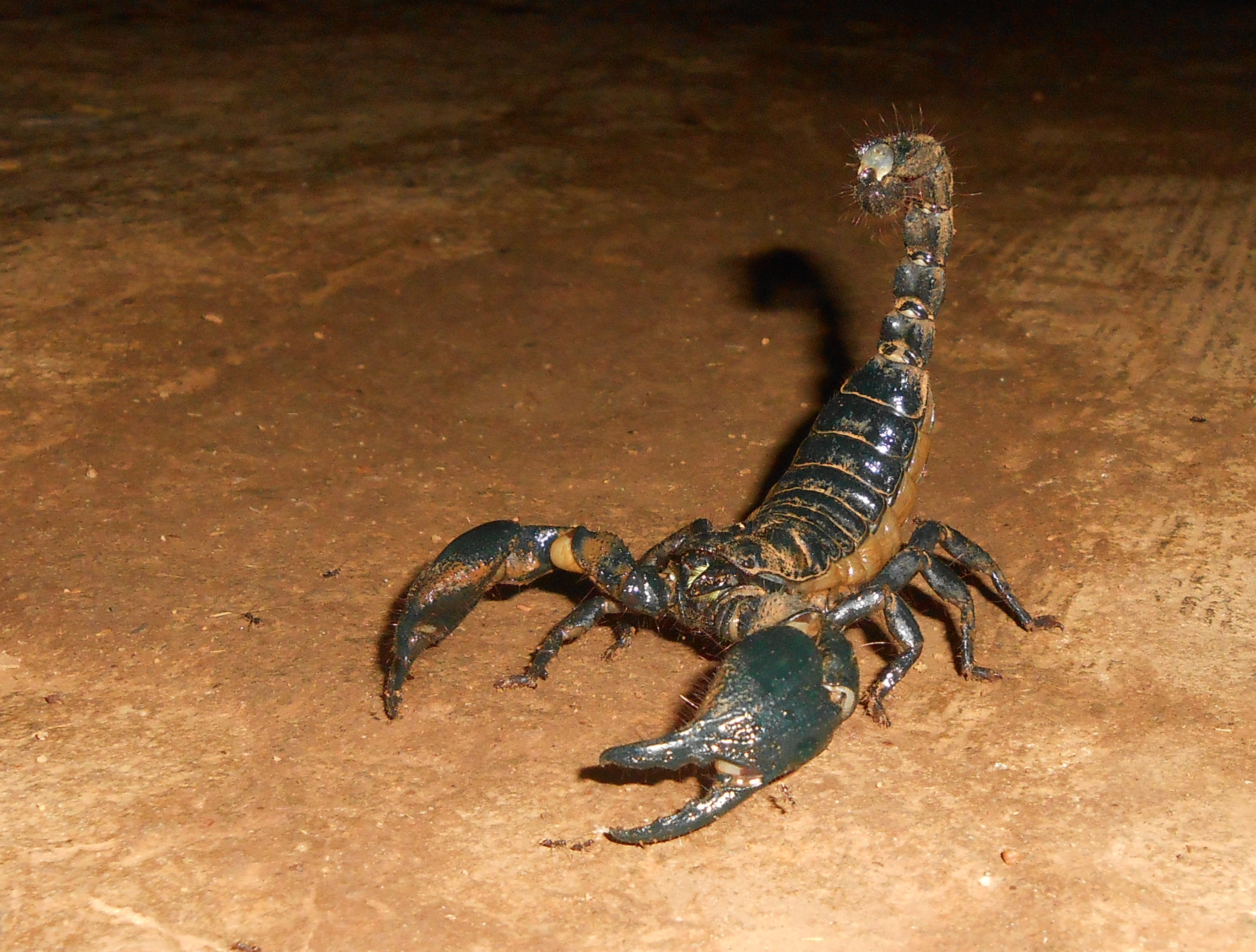
- Gigantometrus swammerdami

Scientific classification
- Kingdom: Animalia
- Phylum: Arthropoda
- Subphylum: Chelicerata
- Class: Arachnida
- Order: Scorpiones
- Family: Scorpionidae
- Genus: Gigantometrus; Couzijn 1978

= Gigantometrus =

Genus of scorpions

Gigantometrus is a genus, whose members are also known by the collective vernacular name giant forest scorpions. There only two species in this genus.

== Species ==
- Gigantometrus swammerdami Simon, 1872
- Gigantometrus titanicus Couzijn, 1981
