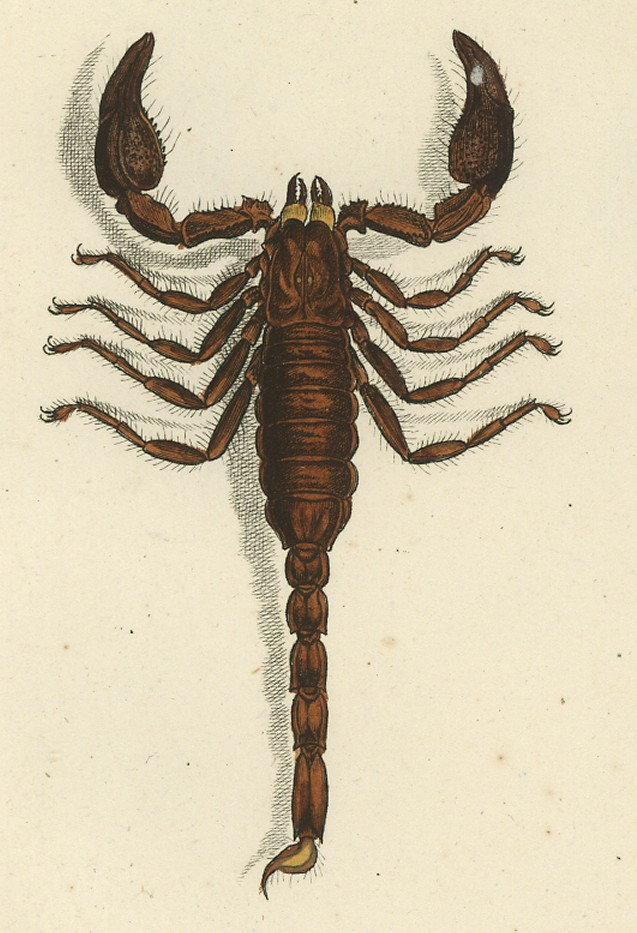

Scientific classification
- Kingdom: Animalia
- Phylum: Arthropoda
- Subphylum: Chelicerata
- Class: Arachnida
- Order: Scorpiones
- Family: Scorpionidae
- Genus: Srilankametrus
- Species: S. indus

Binomial name
- Srilankametrus indus (De Geer, 1778)

Synonyms
- Scorpio indus De Geer, 1778; Heterometrus indus indus Couzijn, 1981; Heterometrus indus Fet, 2000; Scorpio ceylonicus Herbst, 1800; Heterometrus (Heterometrus) spinifer solitarius Couzijn, 1981

= Srilankametrus indus =

Species of scorpion

Srilankametrus indus, commonly known as the giant forest scorpion, is a species of scorpions belonging to the family Scorpionidae. It is native to India and Sri Lanka.

== Description ==
This large scorpion has a total length of 90 to 130 mm. Adults are uniformly reddish black to greenish black in color. Both sexes have 10 to 15 pectinal teeth. The pedipalp chela is hirsute and lobiform. The manus is covered by rounded granules which appear as rows. The pedipalp patella lacks a pronounced internal tubercle. The carapace is smooth and glossy with some marginal granules. Dorsal and dorsolateral carinae of metasomal segments are smooth. The telson vesicle is longer than the aculeus.

A voracious predator, it is known to feed on many larger animals.
