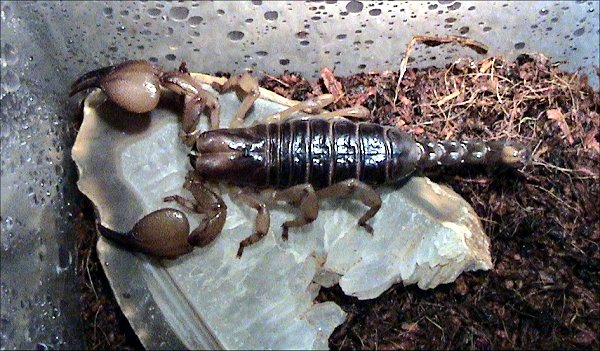
- Tricolored burrowing scorpion (O. glabifrons)

Scientific classification
- Domain: Eukaryota
- Kingdom: Animalia
- Phylum: Arthropoda
- Subphylum: Chelicerata
- Class: Arachnida
- Order: Scorpiones
- Family: Scorpionidae
- Subfamily: Scorpioninae
- Genus: Opistophthalmus; Koch, 1837

Species
- See text

= Opistophthalmus =

Genus of scorpions

Opistophthalmus is a genus of scorpions known commonly as burrowing scorpions, tricolored scorpions, serkets, or hissing scorpions. They are found predominantly in southern Africa. They are known for making deep and elaborate burrows.

== Description ==
Opistophthalmus scorpions are typically heavily built for scorpions, and have broad, powerful claws (chelae). They vary in color from yellow through brown to black, usually with darker or lighter areas. The leg color is typically much lighter than the rest of the body.

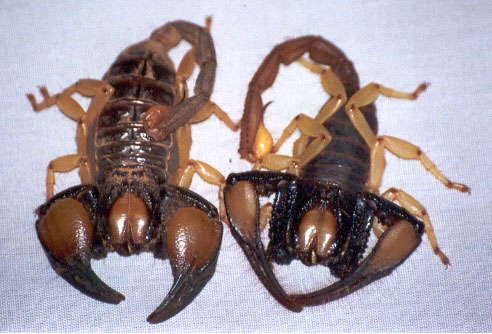
O. pallipes female (left) and male (right)

== Species ==
Sources disagree on how many species are within the genus, but they number around 60:

- Opistophthalmus adustus (Kraepelin,2898)
- Opistophthalmus ammopus (Lamoral, 1980)
- Opistophthalmus ater (Purcell, 1898)
- Opistophthalmus austerus (Karsch, 1879)
- Opistophthalmus boehmi (Kraepelin, 1896)
- Opistophthalmus brevicauda (Lawrence, 1928)
- Opistophthalmus capensis (Herbst, 1800)
- Opistophthalmus carinatus (Peters, 1861)
- Opistophthalmus cavimanus (Lawrence, 1928)
- Opistophthalmus chaperi (Simon, 1880)
- Opistophthalmus chrysites (Lawrence, 1967)
- Opistophthalmus coetzeei (Lamoral, 1979)
- Opistophthalmus concinnus (Newlands, 1972)
- Opistophthalmus crassimanus (Purcell, 1899)
- Opistophthalmus fitzsimonsi (Hewitt, 1935)
- Opistophthalmus flavescens (Purcell, 1898)
- Opistophthalmus fossor (Purcell, 1898)
- Opistophthalmus fuscipes (Purcell, 1899)
- Opistophthalmus gibbericauda (Lamoral, 1979)
- Opistophthalmus gigas (Purcell, 1898)
- Opistophthalmus glabrifrons (Peters, 1861)
- Opistophthalmus granicauda (Purcell, 1898)
- Opistophthalmus granifrons (Pocock, 1896)
- Opistophthalmus haackei (Lawrence, 1966)
- Opistophthalmus holmi (Lawrence, 1969)
- Opistophthalmus intercedens (Kraepelin, 1908)
- Opistophthalmus intermedius (Kraepelin, 1894)
- Opistophthalmus jenseni (Lamoral, 1972)
- Opistophthalmus karrooensis (Purcell, 1898)
- Opistophthalmus keilandsi (Hewitt, 1914)
- Opistophthalmus lamorali (Prendini, 2000)
- Opistophthalmus laticauda (Purcell, 1898)
- Opistophthalmus latimanus (Koch, 1841)
- Opistophthalmus latro (Thorell, 1894)
- Opistophthalmus lawrencei (Newlands, 1969)
- Opistophthalmus leipoldti (Purcell, 1898)
- Opistophthalmus litoralis (Lawrence, 1955)
- Opistophthalmus longicauda (Purcell, 1899)
- Opistophthalmus lornae (Lamoral, 1979)
- Opistophthalmus luciranus (Lawrence, 1959)
- Opistophthalmus lundensis (Monrad, 1937)
- Opistophthalmus macer (Thorell, 1876)
- Opistophthalmus nitidiceps (Pocock, 1896)
- Opistophthalmus opinatus (Simon, 1888)
- Opistophthalmus pallipes (Koch, 1842)
- Opistophthalmus pattisoni (Purcell, 1899)
- Opistophthalmus penrithorum (Lamoral, 1979)
- Opistophthalmus peringueyi (Purcell, 1898)
- Opistophthalmus pictus (Kraepelin, 1894)
- Opistophthalmus pluridens (Hewitt, 1918)
- Opistophthalmus praedo (Thorell, 1876)
- Opistophthalmus pugnax (Thorell, 1876)
- Opistophthalmus pygmaeus (Lamoral, 1979)
- Opistophthalmus scabrifrons (Hewitt, 1913)
- Opistophthalmus schlechteri (Purcell, 1898)
- Opistophthalmus schultzei (Kraepelin, 1908)
- Opistophthalmus setifrons (Lawrence, 1961)
- Opistophthalmus ugabensis (Hewitt, 1934)
- Opistophthalmus wahlbergii (Thorell, 1876)
- Opistophthalmus werneri (Lamoral & Reynders, 1975)

== In captivity ==
O. glabrifrons, O. wahlbergii, and O. boehmi are readily available in the exotic pet trade. They are generally hardy captives, but tend to have a nervous disposition and if set up properly with deep substrate, they are rarely seen, as they burrow and hide most of the time.

== Toxicity ==
In southern Africa, thick-clawed scorpions belonging to the families Scorpionidae, Bothriuridae, and Ischnuridae, are generally assumed to be harmless. However, Opistophthalmus glabrifrons is an exception to the rule. Opistophthalmus species are burrowing scorpions, and probably never leave their burrows except when coming out to mate. This probably accounts for the timing and relative rarity of their stings.
