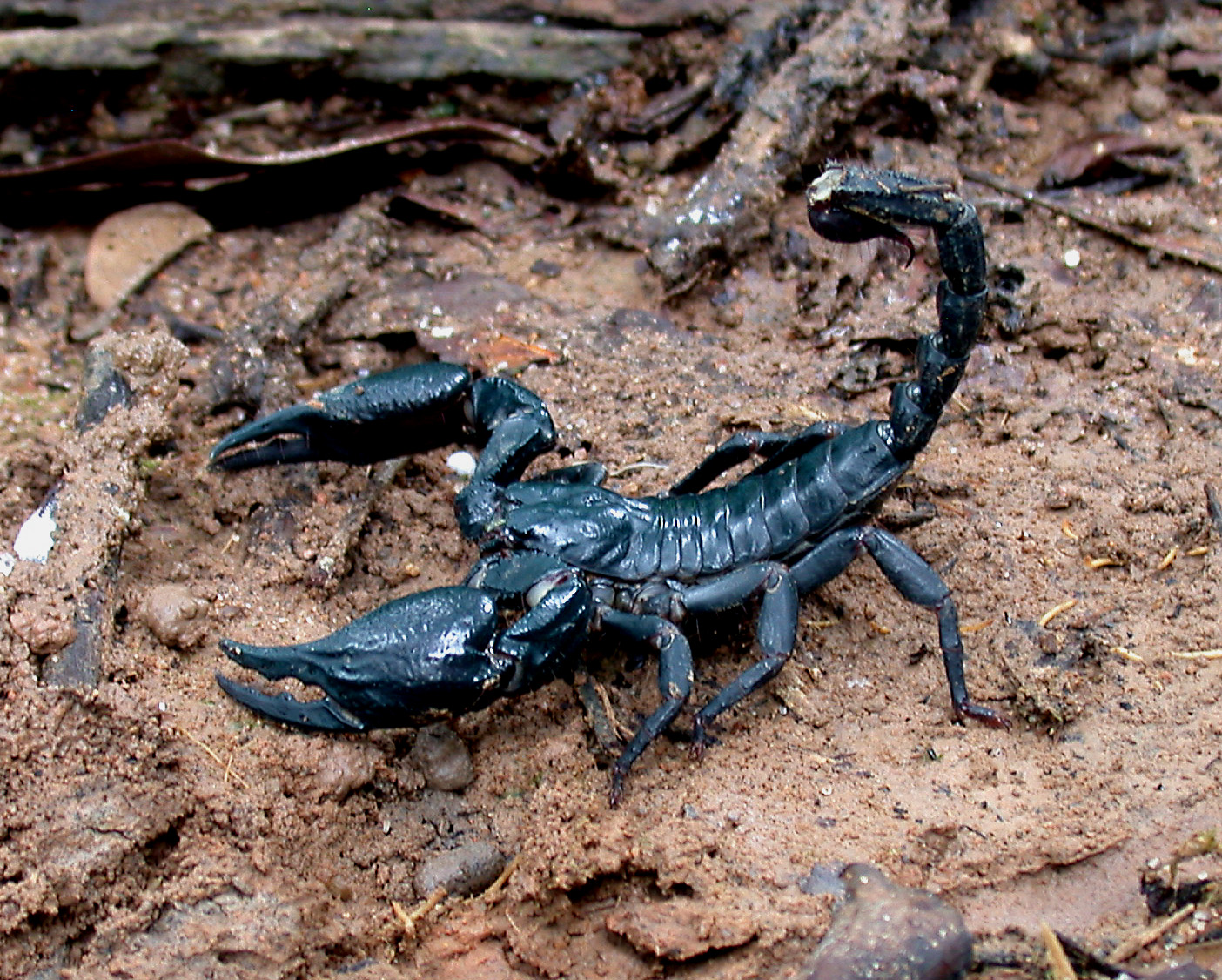
- Heterometrus spinifer

Scientific classification
- Kingdom: Animalia
- Phylum: Arthropoda
- Subphylum: Chelicerata
- Class: Arachnida
- Order: Scorpiones
- Family: Scorpionidae
- Subfamily: Heterometrinae
- Genus: Heterometrus; Ehrenberg, 1828

Type species
- Buthus (Heterometrus) spinifer Ehrenberg, 1828

Diversity
- 9 species

Synonyms
- Palamnaeus Thorell, 1876

= Heterometrus =

Genus of scorpions

Heterometrus, whose members are also known by the collective vernacular name Asian Forest Scorpion, is a genus of scorpions belonging to the family Scorpionidae. It is distributed widely across tropical and subtropical southeastern Asia, including Indonesia, Brunei, Malaysia, Myanmar, Philippines, Singapore, Cambodia, Laos, Thailand, Vietnam, India (Nicobar Islands, Andaman Islands), and China (Hainan). It is notable for containing some of the largest living species of scorpions.

== Taxonomy ==
The genus was introduced by C.G. Ehrenberg (in Hemprich & Ehrenberg, 1828), originally as a subgenus of the genus Buthus. It was elevated to genus rank by F. Karsch in 1879. H.W.C. Couzijn (1978, 1981) subdivided the genus into several subgenera, but F. Kovařík (2004) synonymized these subgenera with the nominal genus. In 2020 the genus was reviewed by L. Prendini & S. F. Loria, three of the former subgenera were revalidated and elevated to genera and one valid subgenus was elevated to genus rank, species were transferred to appropriate genera, resulting in 28 new combinations.

=== Diversity ===
The content of this genus may vary, depending on the authority. Nine species are known as of 2024, many of which are quite similar in appearance:

- Heterometrus cimrmani Kovarik, 2004
- Heterometrus glaucus (Thorell, 1876)
- Heterometrus laevigatus (Thorell, 1876) nomen dubium
- Heterometrus laoticus Couzijn, 1981
- Heterometrus longimanus (Herbst, 1800)
- Heterometrus petersii (Thorell, 1876)
- Heterometrus silenus (Simon, 1884)
- Heterometrus spinifer (Ehrenberg, 1828)
- Heterometrus thorellii (Pocock, 1897)

== General characteristics ==
Members of Heterometrus are generally large-sized scorpions (100–200 mm or about 4-8 in total length). Coloration is dark in most species, often uniformly brown or black, sometimes with a greenish shine, with brighter-colored telson, walking legs, and/or pedipalp pincers in some species. The scorpions are heavily built with especially powerful and globose pedipalp pionkes, broad mesosomal tergites and a proportionally slender and thin metasoma. The telson is proportionally small and the stinger is often shorter than the vesicle. The cephalothorax and mesosoma are largely devoid of carinae and granulation and the median eyes are situated in a small, lenticular depression on the cephalothorax. Some species are parthenogenic.

=== Toxicity ===
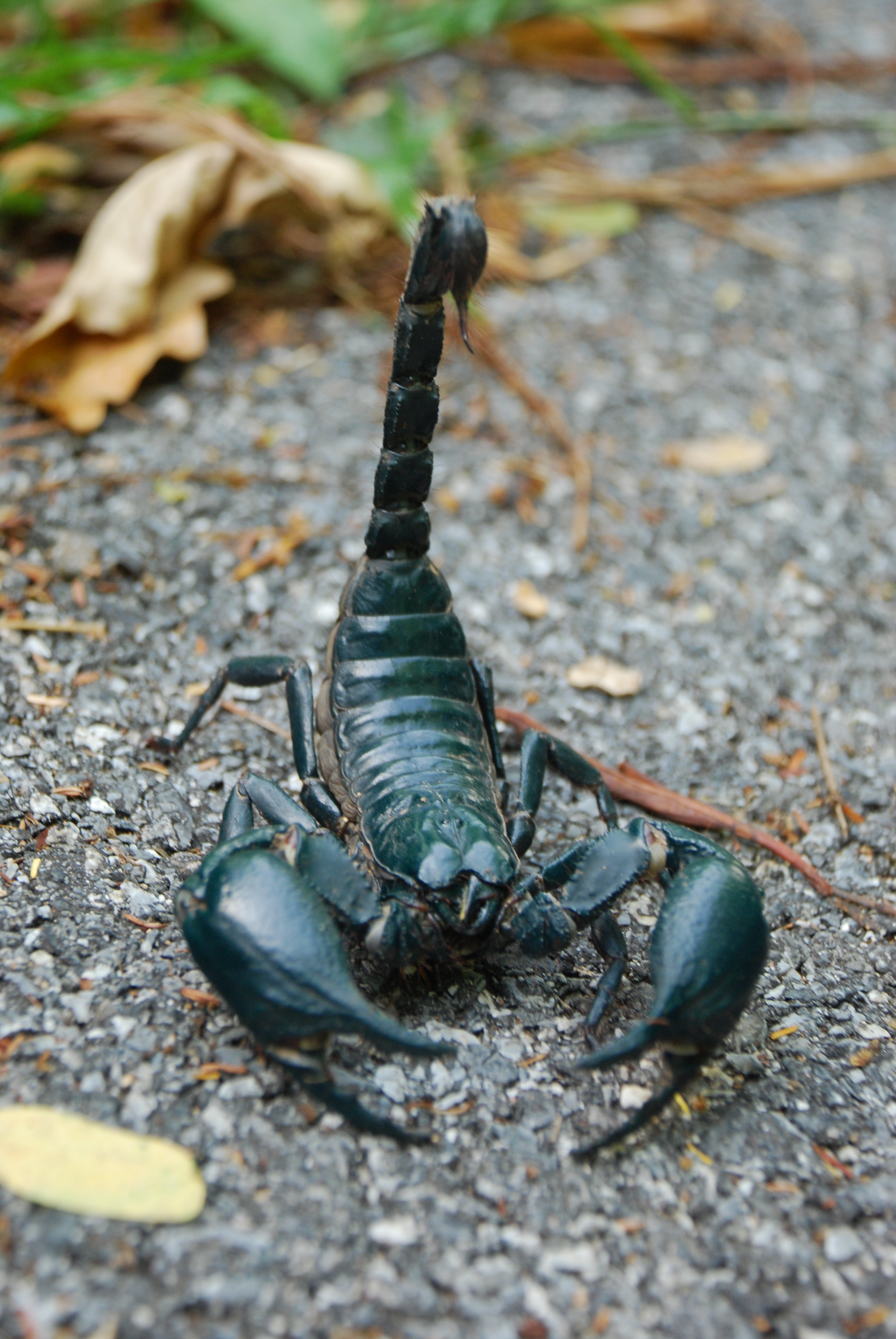
Heterometrus laoticus at Khao Yai National Park, Thailand

As in other genera of the Scorpionidae, the symptoms from Heterometrus envenomations are rather mild and no human fatalities are known. The sting causes local pain, inflammation, oedema, swelling, and redness of the skin, lasting for hours to a few days. Plant extracts known in traditional Thai medicine as natural scorpion venom antidotes are effective as symptomatic treatment of H. laoticus stings. The protein heteroscorpine-1 was found the major component of the venom in H. laoticus.

== Habitat for the scorpion ==
Species of Heterometrus live in vegetated, often forested, humid regions with subtropical to tropical climates. As most scorpions, they are predominantly nocturnal and hide in burrows, below logs, and in leaf litter.

== In captivity ==
Due to their impressive size, low toxicity, and docile behavior, species of Heterometrus are popular pet scorpions. Unlike many other scorpions, they can potentially be kept in pairs or small groups, though it can carry inherent risks and require specific conditions, such as providing a well-structured enclosure with multiple hides, plenty of space, and abundant enrichment to minimize stress and competition.
