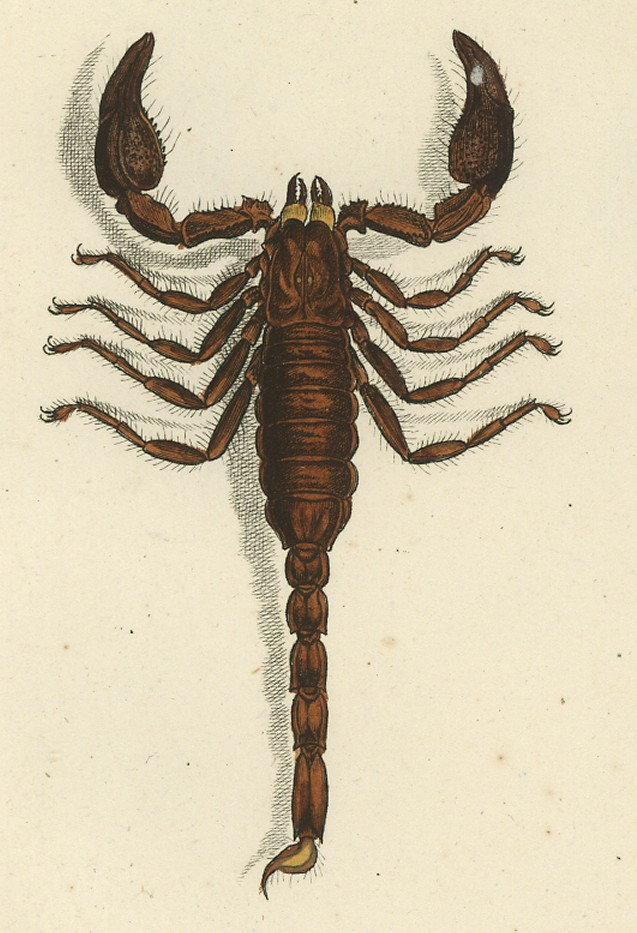
- Srilankametrus indus

Scientific classification
- Kingdom: Animalia
- Phylum: Arthropoda
- Subphylum: Chelicerata
- Class: Arachnida
- Order: Scorpiones
- Superfamily: Scorpionoidea
- Family: Scorpionidae; Latreille, 1802

Subfamilies
- Heterometrinae; Opistophthalminae; Pandininae; Scorpioninae; Urodacinae

= Scorpionidae =

Family of arachnids

Scorpionidae is a family of burrowing scorpions or pale-legged scorpions in the superfamily Scorpionoidea. The family was established by Pierre André Latreille, 1802.

== Genera ==
Scorpionidae contains the following genera:

- Aops Volschenk & Prendini, 2008
- Chersonesometrus Couzijn, 1978
- Deccanometrus Prendini & Loria, 2020
- Gigantometrus Couzijn, 1978
- Heterometrus Ehrenberg, 1828
- Javanimetrus Couzijn, 1978
- Jordanius Afifeh, Yagmur, Al-Saraireh & Amr, 2024
- Opistophthalmus C. L. Koch, 1837
- Pandiborellius Rossi, 2015
- Pandinoides Fet, 1997
- Pandinops Birula, 1913
- Pandinopsis Vachon, 1974
- Pandinurus Fet, 1997
- Pandinus Thorell, 1876
- Pandipalpus Rossi, 2015
- Sahyadrimetrus Prendini & Loria, 2020
- Scorpio Linnaeus, 1758
- Srilankametrus Couzijn, 1981
