= Animal attacks in Latin America =

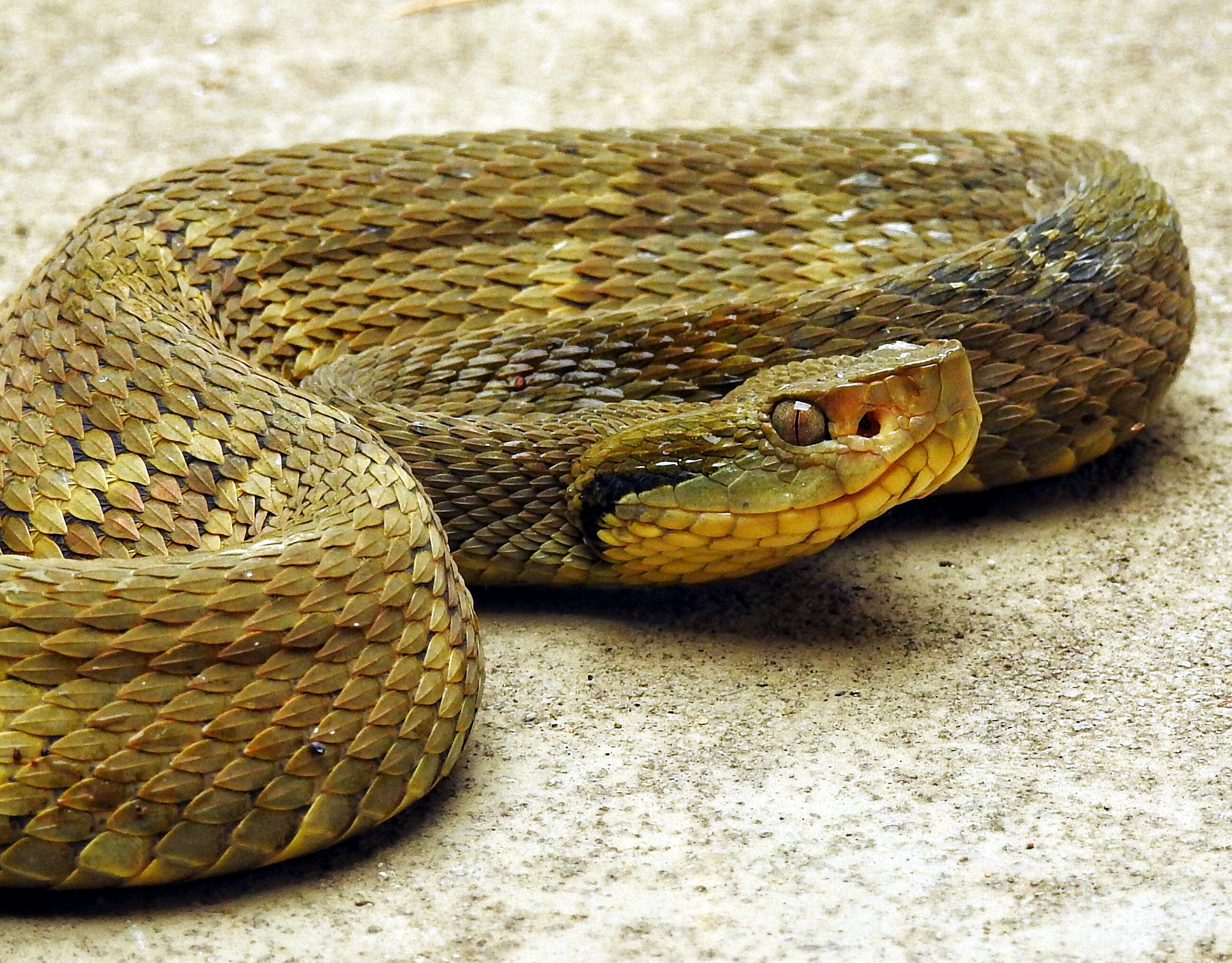
Jararaca Pit viper.

List of reported attacks and species involved in Latin America.

== Reptiles ==
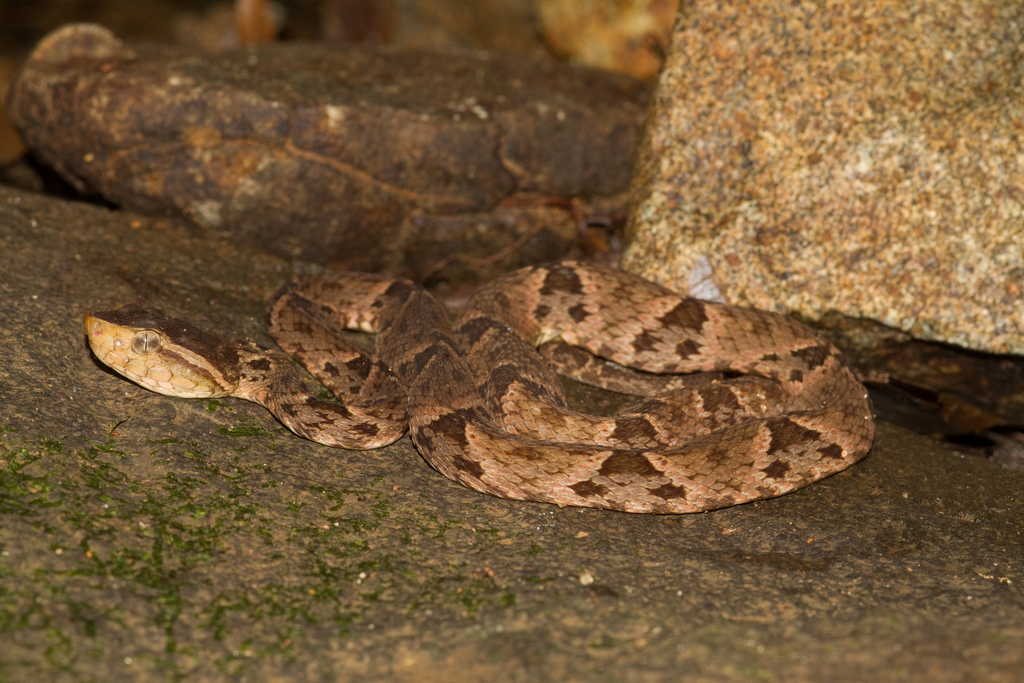
Bothrops asper

Snakes

Snake bites are a major problem in Latin America, with an estimated 70,000 cases every year. Due to underreporting (likely a result of inadequate transportation or limited communications in rural communities), these numbers are estimated to be much higher. The main species involved in accidents are viperids, especially lanceheads (Bothrops) and rattlesnakes (Crotalus). Within Central America, Panama records approximately 2,000 bites every year, while Costa Rica has some of the highest lethality rates, at 0.5% of bites resulting in death. In South America, Brazil reports that around 0.42% of bites result in death, with 70-90% of bites in Brazil being caused by lanceheads. The most notorious species include Bothrops asper (Mexico, south to northern South America), Bothrops atrox (in the Amazon rainforest) and Bothrops jararaca (Brazil, Argentina, Paraguay). Despite their aggressive reputation, and stereotyped as a 'human-chaser', bites by bushmasters (Lachesis) are rare, but the mortality rate is higher. Among elapids, the new-world coral snakes (Leptomicrurus, Micrurus, Micruroides) are responsible for only 1-2% of incidents, while bites by the yellow-bellied sea snake are even more rare. (See Snakebites in Latin America). In Brazil, the South American rattlesnake (Crotalus durissus) is responsible for some of the highest rates of untreated bites leading to death (around 72% of cases); with proper medical treatment and serum, this number is reduced to approx. 11%.

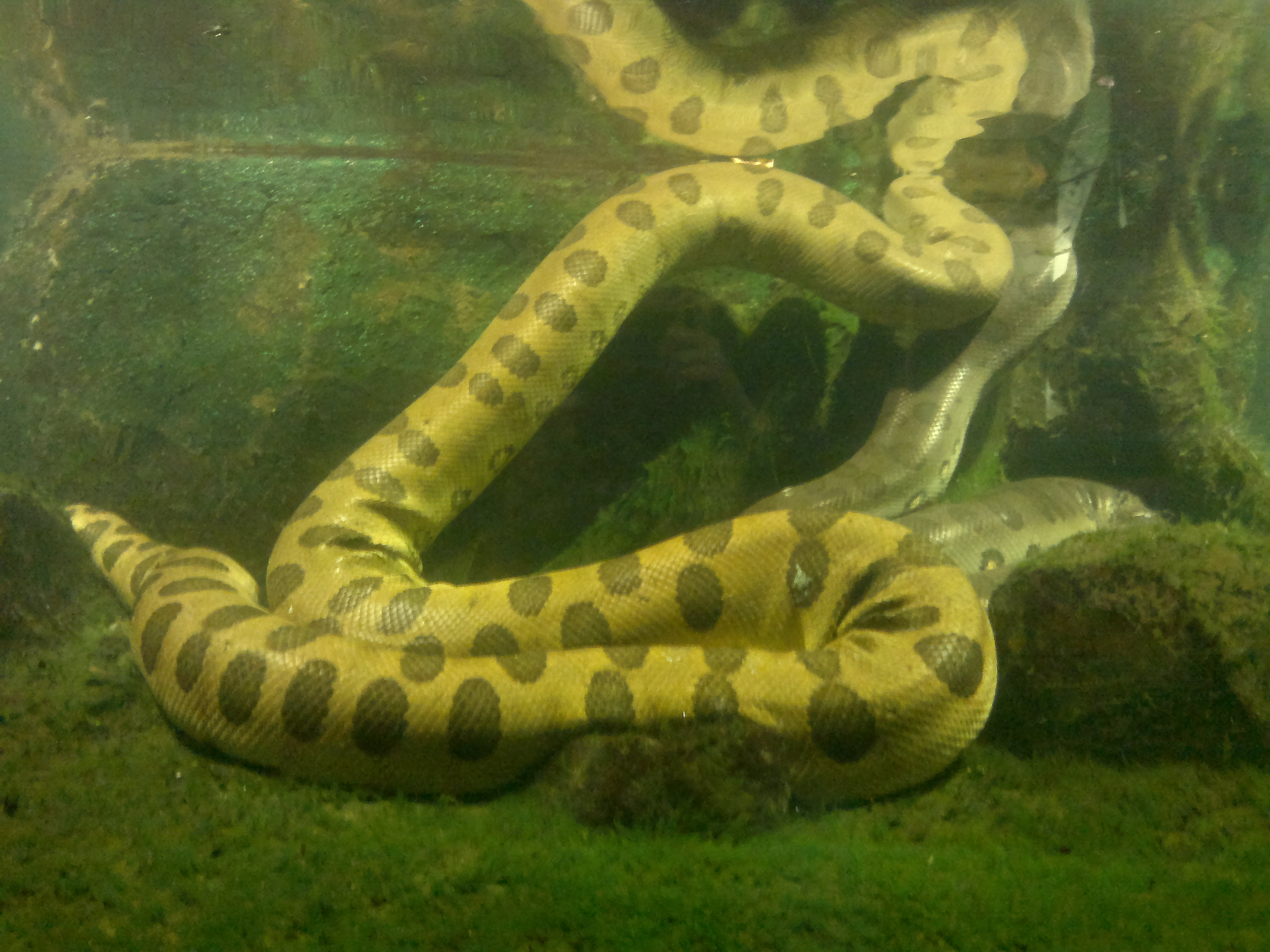
Green anaconda in the water.

Attacks by large snakes, such as the green anaconda (Eunectes murinus), are quite rare due to the snakes generally avoiding noisy human settlements; likewise, the anaconda's preferred habitat is usually dense forest, and virtually inaccessible to people. In 2007, in Brazil, a 5-meter (16 ft) green anaconda attacked an 8-year-old boy; however, he was saved by his 66-year-old grandfather.

Crocodilians

Black caiman (Melanosuchus niger) The black caiman is a large crocodilian—one of the largest in the Americas—measuring up to 6 meters (20 ft) in length, and weighing up to 300 kg. The species occurs in the rivers and lakes of the Amazon Basin, and south to the Pantanal region into northern Argentina. Attacks are uncommon, despite the caiman's grumpy nature, with most incidences affecting fisherman and rural villagers who swim or bathe in caiman-inhabited waterways; in 2010, an 11-year-old boy died from a black caiman attack. The spectacled caiman (Caiman crocodilus) also has been reported to occasionally attack humans in South America. In the sixteen-year period from 2000 to 2016, just 23 fatal attacks by black caiman were recorded, mainly in the Amazon Basin.

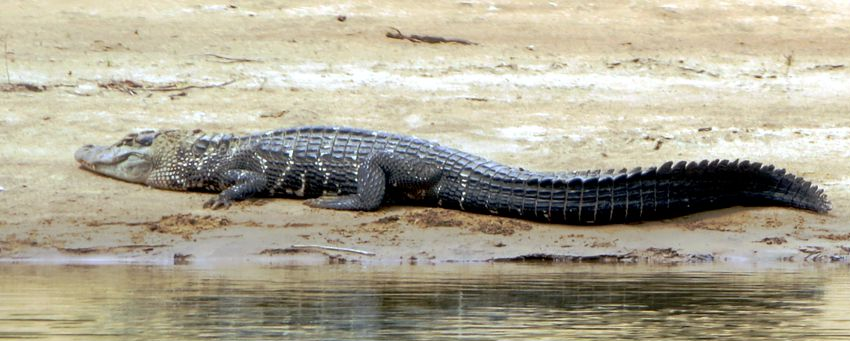
Black caiman (Melanosuchus niger)

Orinoco crocodile (Crocodylus intermedius) The Orinoco crocodile is the largest reptilian predator in the Americas, and also the most critically endangered due to humans. Currently only found in Colombia and Venezuela, the color of its body varies from greenish gray and tan to gray, mirrored with dark green. The Orinoco crocodile has short legs with a powerful tail, and the largest recorded animal reached almost 7 meters (23 ft) in length, but normally they do not exceed 5 meters (16 ft) long. A small number of better-documented fatal attacks were reported in the 1900s–1930s, when the species was still relatively common and unaffected by human encroachment. The only well-documented recent attack, on a fisherman in 2009, was initially serious but not fatal.

American crocodile (Crocodylus acutus) The American crocodile inhabits Florida, in the United States, as well as México, on both coasts (except for Baja California). Its range continues south to northern South America, with the most dense population being found in Costa Rica. The American crocodile grows up to 4.6 metres (15 ft) long with a weight of around 2,000 pounds, or up to one metric ton. American crocodiles have been known to attack, and even kill, humans and domestic animals that drink at the water's edge. From 1995 to 2017, 36 attacks were reported in Cancún, Mexico, with many incidents resulting from poor judgment by tourists or intoxicated individuals. Since 2013, there have been eight attacks in Costa Rica, with two against surfers, as the crocodiles are known to frequent crowded beaches and are highly tolerant of saltwater; at Tamarindo Beach, a man had to have a leg amputated after an attack.

== Mammals ==
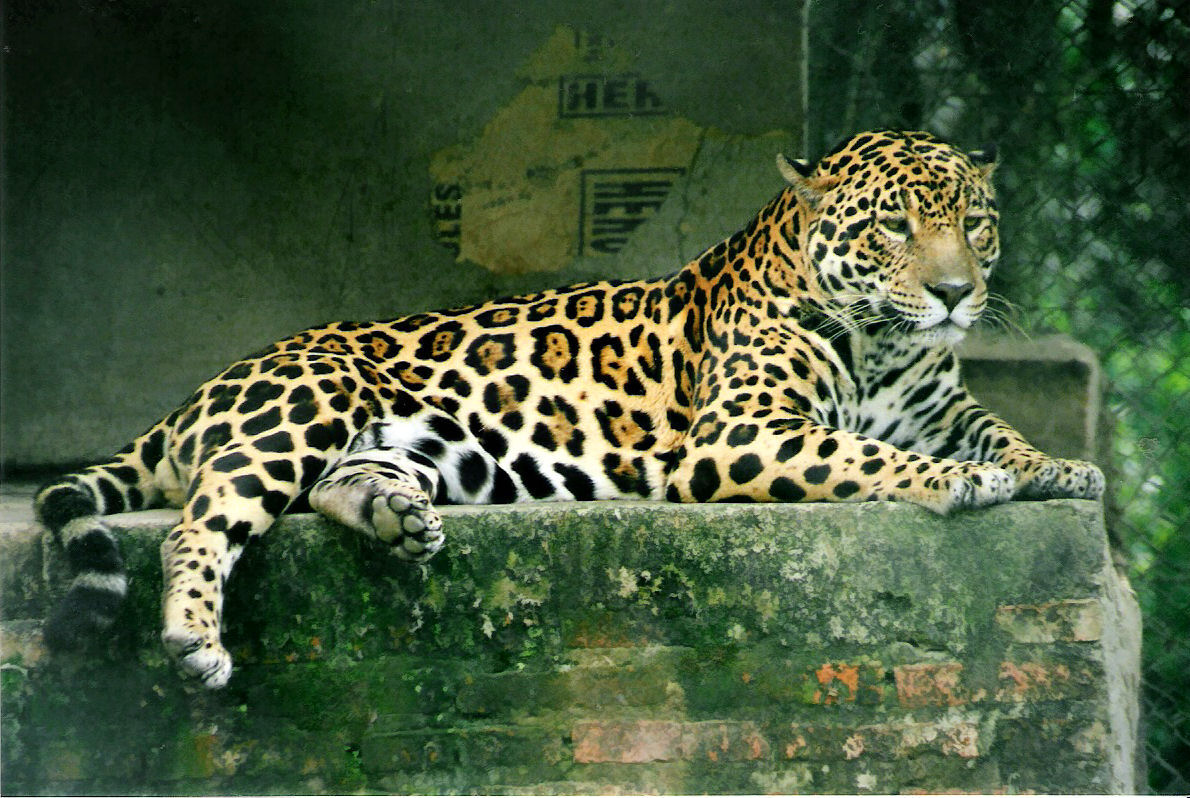
Jaguar.

Jaguar (Panthera onca) The jaguar is a compact and well-muscled animal. It is the largest cat native to the Americas and the third largest in the world, exceeded in size by the tiger and the lion. Its coat is generally a tawny yellow, but ranges to reddish-brown, for most of the body. The ventral areas are white. The fur is covered with rosettes for camouflage in the dappled light of its forest habitat. The spots and their shapes vary between individual jaguars: rosettes may include one or several dots. The spots on the head and neck are generally solid, as are those on the tail, where they may merge to form a band. Jaguars living in forests are often darker and considerably smaller than those living in open areas, possibly due to the smaller numbers of large, herbivorous prey in forest areas. Its size and weight vary considerably: weights are normally in the range of 56–96 kg (123–212 lb). Exceptionally big males have been recorded to weigh as much as 158 kg (348 lb). The smallest females weigh about 36 kg (79 lb). It is sexually dimorphic with females typically 10–20% smaller than males. The length, from the nose to the base of the tail, varies from 1.12 to 1.85 m (3 ft 8 in to 6 ft 1 in). The tail is the shortest of any big cat, at 45 to 75 cm (18 to 30 in) in length. Legs are also short, but thick and powerful, considerably shorter when compared to a small tiger or lion in a similar weight range. The jaguar stands 63 to 76 cm (25 to 30 in) tall at the shoulders.Further variations in size have been observed across regions and habitats, with size tending to increase from north to south. Jaguars in the Chamela-Cuixmala Biosphere Reserve on the Pacific coast of central Mexico weighed around 50 kg (110 lb), about the size of a female cougar. Jaguars in Venezuela and Brazil are much larger with average weights of about 95 kg (209 lb) in males and of about 56–78 kg (123–172 lb) in females. Attacks by jaguars are rare, some fatal and non-fatal cases have been reported in Central Brazil. Jaguars did not evolve eating large primates, and do not normally see humans as food. Experts have cited them as the least likely of all big cats to kill and eat humans, and the majority of attacks come when it has been cornered or wounded. However, such behavior appears to be more frequent where humans enter jaguar habitat, and decrease prey. Captive jaguars sometimes attack zookeepers. When the Spanish conquistadors arrived in the Americas, they feared jaguars. Nevertheless, even in those times, the jaguar's chief prey was the capybara in South America, and the peccary further north. Charles Darwin reported a saying of indigenous peoples of the Americas that people would not have to fear the jaguar, as long as capybaras were abundant.

Cougar (Puma concolor) Cougars are slender and agile members of the Felidae. They are the fourth-largest cat species worldwide; adults stand about 60 to 90 cm (24 to 35 in) tall at the shoulders. Adult males are around 2.4 m (7.9 ft) long from nose to tail tip, and females average 2.05 m (6.7 ft), with overall ranges between 1.50 to 2.75 m (4.9 to 9.0 ft) nose to tail suggested for the species in general. Of this length, the tail typically accounts for 63 to 95 cm (25 to 37 in). Males generally weigh 53 to 100 kg (117 to 220 lb), averaging 68 kg (150 lb). Females typically weigh between 29 and 64 kg (64 and 141 lb), averaging 55 kg (121 lb). Cougar size is smallest close to the equator and larger towards the poles. The largest recorded cougar, shot in 1901, weighed 105.2 kg (232 lb); claims of 125.2 kg (276 lb) and 118 kg (260 lb) have been reported, though they were most likely exaggerated. On average, adult male cougars in British Columbia weigh 56.7 kg (125 lb) and adult females 45.4 kg (100 lb), though several male cougars in British Columbia weighed between 86.4 and 95.5 kg (190 and 211 lb). Depending on the locality, cougars can be smaller or bigger than jaguars, but are less muscular and not as powerfully built so their weight is on average less. Whereas cougars tend to be larger as distance increases from the equator, which crosses the northern portion of South America, jaguars are simply generally smaller north of the Amazon River in South America and larger south of that river. For example, while South American jaguars are comparatively large and may exceed 90 kg (200 lb), those in Mexico's Chamela-Cuixmala Biosphere Reserve weigh about the same as female cougars (approximately 50 kg (110 lb)).

Pumas in the Southern Cone of America – often called Argentine cougars by North Americans – are reputed to be extremely reluctant to attack man; in legend, they defended people against jaguars. The nineteenth century naturalists Félix de Azara and William Henry Hudson thought that attacks on people, even children or sleeping adults, did not happen. Hudson, citing anecdotal evidence from hunters, claimed that pumas were positively inhibited from attacking people, even in self-defense. In fact, attacks on humans, although exceedingly rare, have occurred.

An early, authenticated, non-fatal case occurred near Lake Viedma, Patagonia in 1877 when a female mauled the Argentine scientist Francisco P. Moreno; Moreno afterwards showed the scars to Theodore Roosevelt. In this instance, however, Moreno had been wearing a guanaco-hide poncho round his neck and head as protection against the cold; in Patagonia the guanaco is the puma's chief prey animal. Another authenticated case occurred In 1997 in Iguazú National Park, northeast Argentina when the 20-month son of a ranger was killed by a female puma. Forensic analysis found specimens of the child's hair and clothing fibers in the animal's stomach. In this area the coatí is the puma's chief prey. Despite prohibitory signs, coatis are hand-fed by tourists in the park, causing unnatural approximation between cougars and humans. This particular puma had been raised in captivity and released into the wild. In 2012 a 23-year-old woman was found dead in a mountainous area in Salta Province in northwest Argentina. Claw incisions, which severed a jugular vein, indicated that the attacker was a felid; differential diagnosis ruled out other possible perpetrators. (Note: There are no jaguars in the area; other felids were too small to kill humans.) There were no bite marks on the victim, who had been herding goats.

Another fatal attack occurred back in October 2020. Ana Mella Castillo, 28, from the southern Chilean city of Valdivia, was attacked and killed by a Puma in a rural area of the nearby town of Corral, Chile, where she was visiting family, on October 20.

According to local media, the woman left the house at roughly 5pm local time to walk her two dogs. Family members got worried when the 28-year-old did not return home, and went out to look for her.

They found her body in what photos reveal to be a wooded area, and it was covered in wounds thought to have been caused by a wild animal.

Emergency services were called to the scene, who concluded the attack was likely carried out by a puma or other similar animal.

This theory has reportedly been supported by the fact that family members had seen several of the big cats in the area and that the victim's father had allegedly been attacked a few days prior by another puma.

In July 2023, another attack was reported in Chile. Sonia del Carmen Hernández Alvarado, a 76-year-old woman went missing from her home in Petrohué, a village in Chile just under 300 miles south of the capital, Santiago. Searchers found her badly mauled corpse just 4 days after she went missing. Authorities believe that Sonia, the elderly woman was attacked and killed by a large Puma, as the injuries she sustained seemed to have been caused by a big cat.

Fatal attacks by other carnivores such as feral dogs can be misattributed to pumas without appropriate forensic knowledge.

Giant anteater (Myrmecophaga tridactyla) The giant anteaters grow on average, 1.2-2.0 meters and weigh 45 kg, feed on insects, but also on citrus fruits and avocados, these animals can attack when they feel threatened, in Brazil, two ranchers who were hunting were attacked and killed by wounded and cornered animals, in another case, a 47 year old man who was hunting with his 2 children and a dog was attacked, the animal got under his hind legs and grabbed the man with his forelimbs, causing deep wounds on the thighs and arms. In 2010, a 75-year-old man was killed after serious injuries caused by the claws of an anteater.

Giant otter (Pteronura brasiliensis) The giant otter can reach 1.8 meters in length and weigh 30 kg, the species occurs in Brazil, Bolivia, Colombia, Ecuador, Guyana, French Guiana, Paraguay, Peru, Suriname, Venezuela, Argentina and Uruguay. In 1977, a sergeant died after saving a boy at a zoo in the capital of Brasilia. On the Sepotuba River, in Tangará da Serra, there were two recent attacks, a child that was bitten by several otters, and the second occurred with a couple.

Vampire bats (Desmodontinae) They are known to be one of the few bats that feed on blood and because they transmit diseases, however, this is rare. In 2010 four children in Peru died after being bitten. The highest occurrence of rabies in vampire bats occurs in the large populations found in South America. However, the risk of infection to the human population is less than to livestock exposed to bat bites. Only 0.5% of bats carry rabies, and those that do may be clumsy, disoriented, and unable to fly.

== Fishes ==
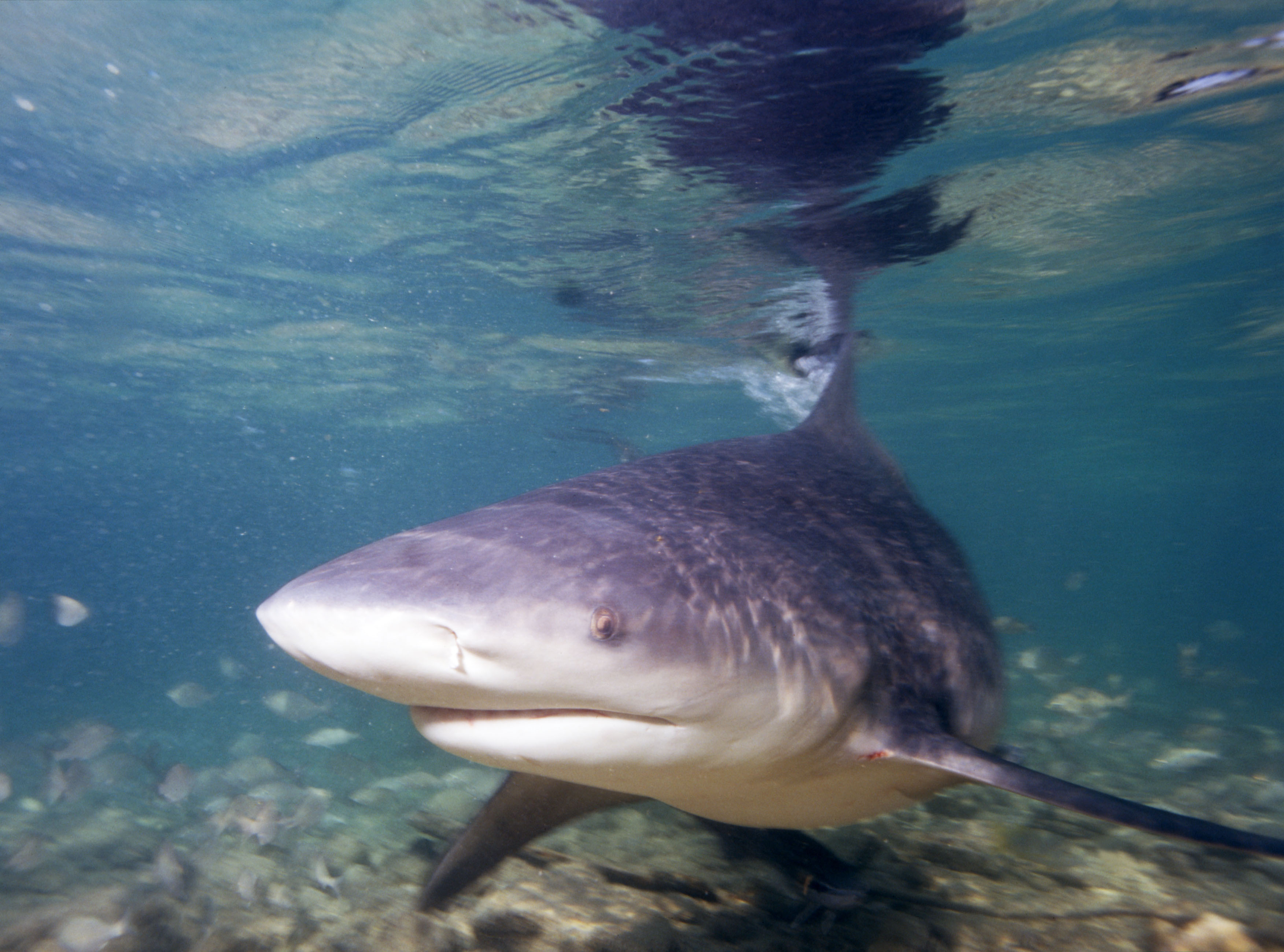
Bull shark.

Sharks were responsible for a large number of attacks and deaths in the region, Brazil has the highest number, about 107, and 30 deaths, followed by Mexico with 62 attacks and 35 fatalities, Cuba with 28 attacks and 16 deaths, Panama registers 27 attacks and 17 deaths, Venezuela has 11 cases and 5 deaths, Costa rica has 6 fatalities of 10 attacks, Colombia with 1 fatality of 8 attacks, Ecuador recorded 8 attacks, no deaths, Chile, with 7 attacks and 4 deaths, followed by Nicaragua, with 6 cases and 4 deaths, both Peru and the Dominican Republic, with 4 cases and 2 deaths, Uruguay, with 3 cases and only 1 death, Both El Salvador and Haiti have 2 deaths, Honduras recorded 2 cases, both died, Aruba registered 1 case, which came to death, followed by Argentina, with one case, with no deaths.

Freshwater stingray

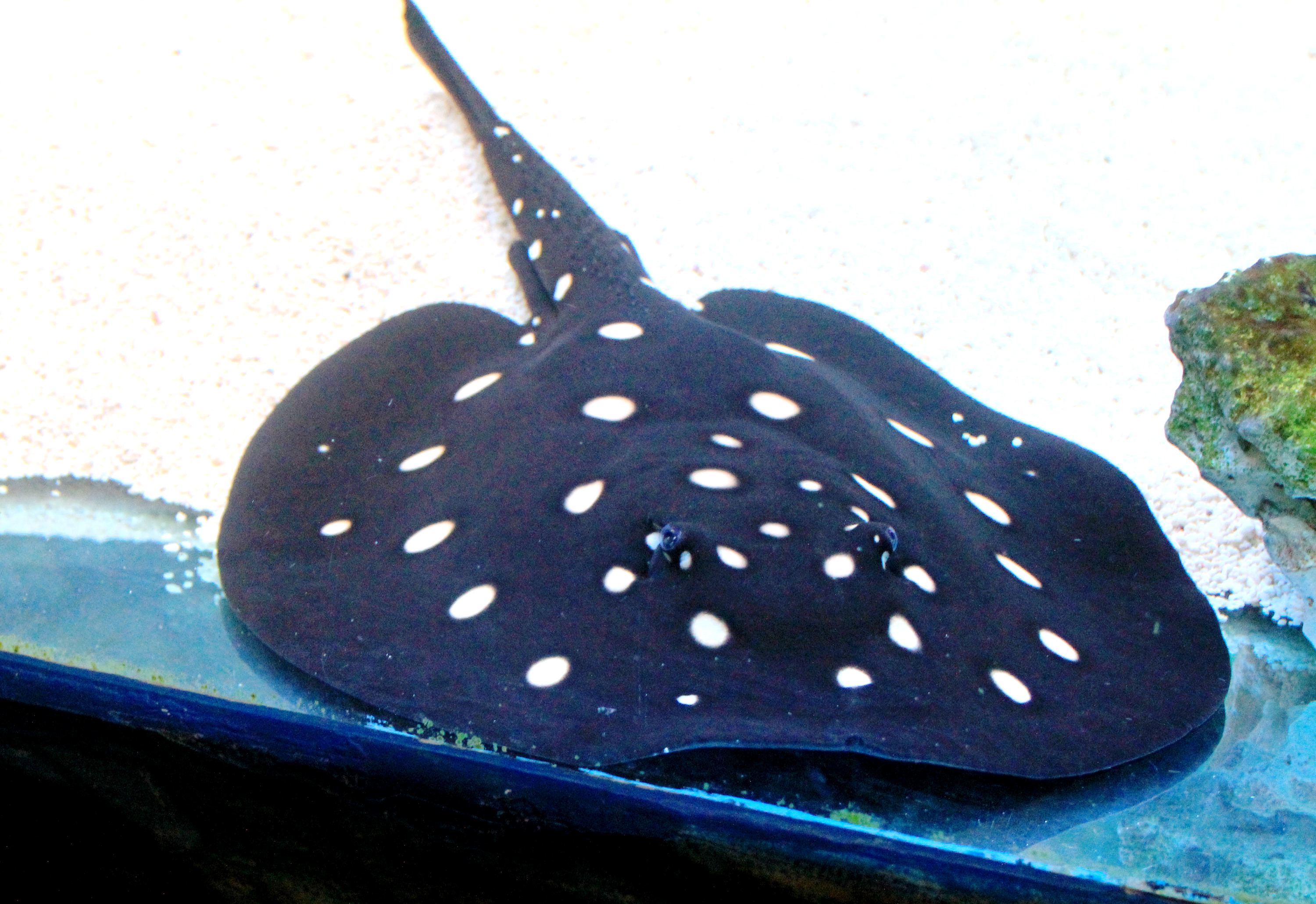
Potamotrygon leopoldi.

Freshwater stingrays (Potamotrygonidae) are a very common cause of attacks by fish in the Amazon, mainly affecting riverside and indigenous populations, the stingray venom has necrotizing, edematous, proteolytic, neurotoxic and myotoxic effects. In the Brazilian Amazon, a case of bacterial infection and hallux necrosis has been reported, with the victim needing amputation. Potamotrygonidae have a venomous stinger on the tail (although it is harmless and vestigal or even absent in Heliotrygon). There are generally one or two stingers, and they are periodically shed and replaced. They are some of the most feared freshwater fishes in the Neotropical region because of the injuries they can cause. In Colombia alone, more than 2,000 injuries are reported per year. Freshwater stingrays are generally non-aggressive, and the stingers are used strictly in self-defense. As a consequence injuries typically occur when bathers step on them (injuries to feet or lower legs) or fishers catch them (injuries to hands or arms). In addition to pain caused by the barbed stinger itself and the venom, bacterial infections of the wounds are common and may account for a greater part of the long-term problems in stinging victims than the actual venom. The stings are typically highly painful and are occasionally fatal to humans, especially people living in rural areas that only seek professional medical help when the symptoms have become severe. In general, relatively little is known about the composites of the venom in freshwater stingrays, but it appears to differ (at least in some species) from that of marine stingrays. There are possibly also significant differences between the venoms of the various Potamotrygonidae species. Due to the potential danger they represent, some locals strongly dislike freshwater stingrays and may kill them on sight. A study at the Butantan Institute, São Paulo, Brazil, revealed that the freshwater stingray venom changes according to sex and age, with the composition varying even between individuals of the same species. Each time the environment changes, the feeding of the stingray changes, leading to changes in the composition of toxins and toxicological effects. There is no specific antidote or treatment for freshwater stingray. Accidents occur when the rays are stepped on or when the fins are touched, the defensive behavior consists of turning the body, moving the tail and introducing the stinger into the victim. Generally, stingers are inserted into the feet and heels of babysitters and the hands of fishermen. Initial symptoms include severe pain, erythema and edema, then necrosis occurs which results in sagging tissue in the affected area and forms a deep ulcer, which develops slowly. Systemic complications include nausea, vomiting, salivation, sweating, respiratory depression, muscle fasciculation and seizures. Once the stinger is torn during penetration into the skin, it can break and cause dentin fragments to be retained in the wound. The stinger can cause laceration, which results in secondary infection, usually caused by Pseudomonas and Staphylococcus. If the stinger reaches internal organs, it can be fatal.

Candiru

To date, there is only one documented case of a candiru entering a human urethra, which took place in Itacoatiara, Brazil, in 1997. In this incident, the victim (a 23-year-old man known only as "F.B.C.") claimed a candiru "jumped" from the water into his urethra as he urinated while thigh-deep in a river. After traveling to Manaus on October 28, 1997, the victim underwent a two-hour urological surgery by Dr. Anoar Samad to remove the fish from his body.

In 1999, American marine biologist Stephen Spotte traveled to Brazil to investigate this particular incident in detail. He recounts the events of his investigation in his book Candiru: Life and Legend of the Bloodsucking Catfishes. Spotte met Dr. Samad in person and interviewed him at his practice and home. Samad gave him photos, the original VHS tape of the cystoscopy procedure, and the actual fish's body preserved in formalin as his donation to the INPA. Spotte and his colleague Paulo Petry took these materials and examined them at the INPA, comparing them with Samad's formal paper. While Spotte did not overtly express any conclusions as to the veracity of the incident, he did remark on several observations that were suspicious about the claims of the patient and/or Samad himself.

- According to Samad, the patient claimed "the fish had darted out of the water, up the urine stream, and into his urethra". While this is the most popularly known legendary trait of the candiru, according to Spotte it has been known conclusively to be a myth for more than a century, as it is impossible because of simple fluid physics.
- The documentation and specimen provided indicate a fish that was 133.5 mm in length and had a head with a diameter of 11.5 mm. This would have required significant force to pry the urethra open to this extent. The candiru has no appendages or other apparatus that would have been necessary to accomplish this, and if it were leaping out of the water as the patient claimed, it would not have had sufficient leverage to force its way inside.
- Samad's paper claims the fish must have been attracted by the urine. This belief about the fish has been held for centuries, but was discredited in 2001. While this was merely speculation on Samad's part based on the prevailing scientific knowledge at the time, it somewhat erodes the patient's story by eliminating the motivation for the fish to have attacked him in the first place.
- Samad claimed the fish had "chewed" its way through the ventral wall of the urethra into the patient's scrotum. Spotte notes that the candiru does not possess the right teeth or strong enough dentition to have been capable of this.
- Samad claimed he had to snip the candiru's grasping spikes off in order to extract it, yet the specimen provided had all its spikes intact.
- The cystoscopy video depicts traveling into a tubular space (presumed to be the patient's urethra) containing the fish's carcass and then pulling it out backwards through the urethral opening, something that would have been almost impossible with the fish's spikes intact.

Electric eel

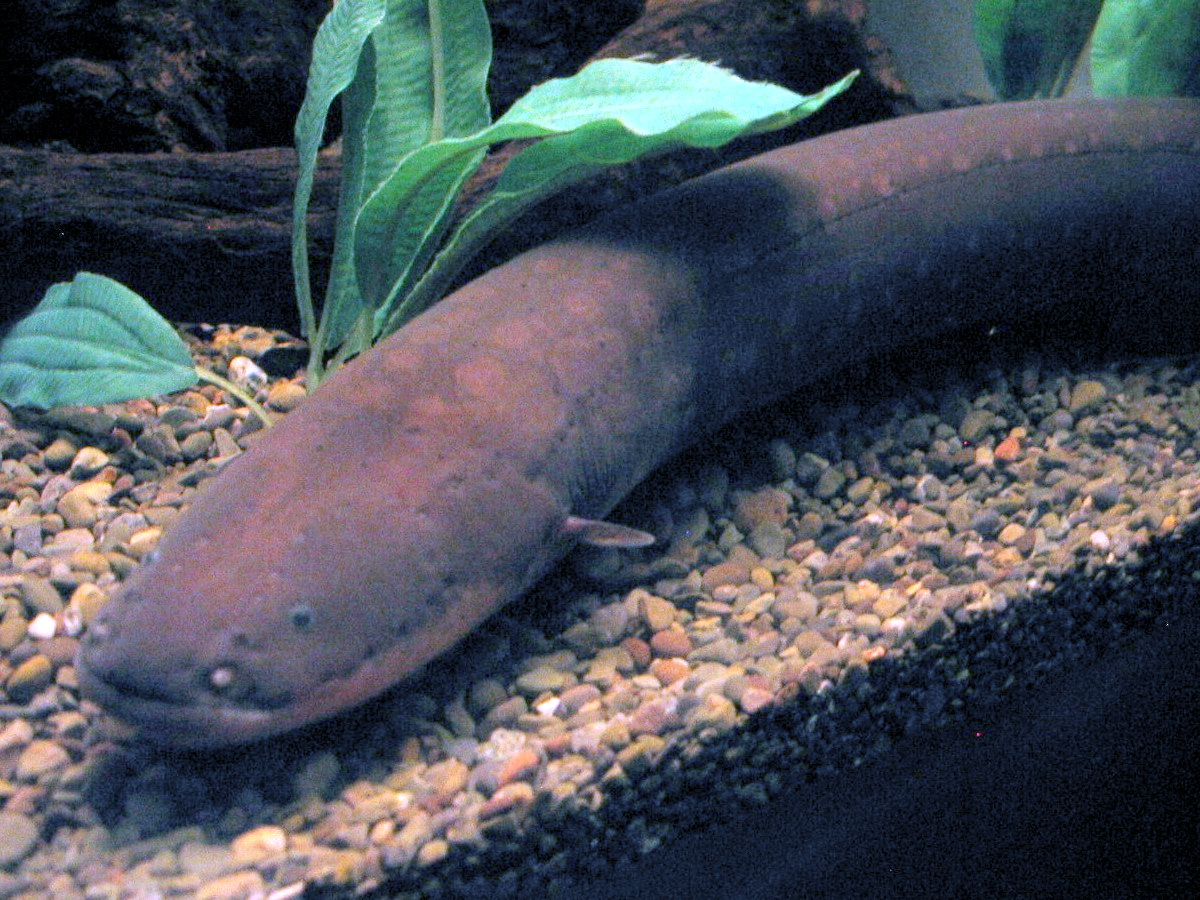
Electric eel.

The electric eel (Electrophorus), a fish that can reach 2 meters in length, which lives in the rivers of the Amazon, is suspected of having killed two children, in 2019, two new species were discovered, one of which was described as having an electric discharge 8 times bigger than an outlet. The electric eel has three pairs of abdominal organs that produce electricity: the main organ, the Hunter's organ, and the Sach's organ. These organs make up four fifths of its body, and give the electric eel the ability to generate two types of electric organ discharges: low voltage and high voltage. These organs are made of electrocytes, lined up so a current of ions can flow through them and stacked so each one adds to a potential difference. When the eel finds its prey, the brain sends a signal through the nervous system to the electrocytes. This opens the ion channels, allowing sodium to flow through, reversing the polarity momentarily. By causing a sudden difference in electric potential, it generates an electric current in a manner similar to a battery, in which stacked plates each produce an electric potential difference. Electric eels are also capable of controlling their prey's nervous systems with their electrical abilities; by controlling their victim's nervous system and muscles via electrical pulses, they can keep prey from escaping or force it to move so they can locate its position.

Piranhas

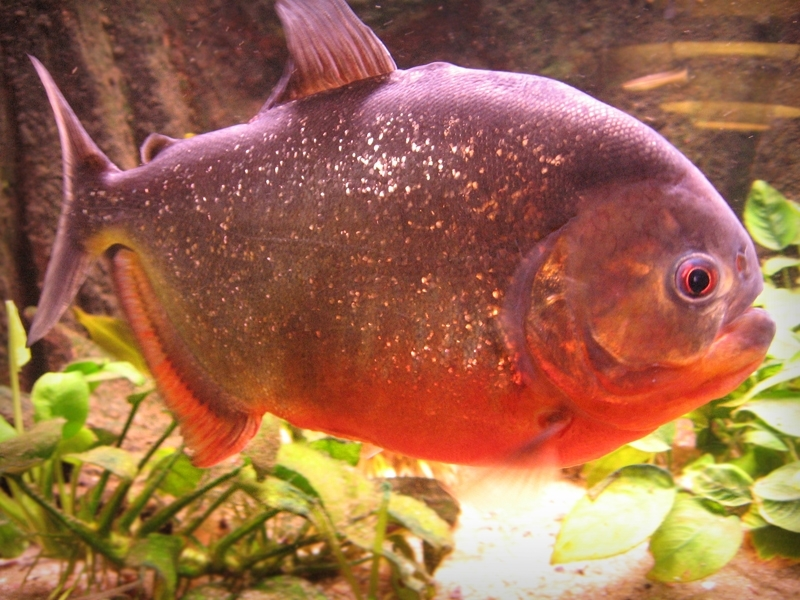
Red bellied piranha.

Most piranha attacks on humans only result in minor injuries, typically to the feet or hands, but they are occasionally more serious and very rarely can be fatal. Near the city of Palmas in Brazil, 190 piranha attacks, all involving single bites to the feet, were reported in the first half of 2007 in an artificial lake, which appeared after the damming of the Tocantins River. In the state of São Paulo, a series of attacks in 2009 in the Tietê River resulted in 15 people with minor injuries. In 2011, another series of attacks at José de Freitas in the Brazilian state of Piauí resulted in 100 people being treated for bites to their toes or heels. On 25 December 2013, more than 70 bathers were attacked at Rosario in Argentina, causing injuries to their hands or feet. In 2011, a drunk 18-year-old man was attacked and killed in Rosario del Yata, Bolivia. In 2012, a five-year-old Brazilian girl was attacked and killed by a shoal of P. nattereri. In February 2015, a six-year-old girl died after being attacked by piranhas when her grandmother's boat capsized during a vacation in Brazil.

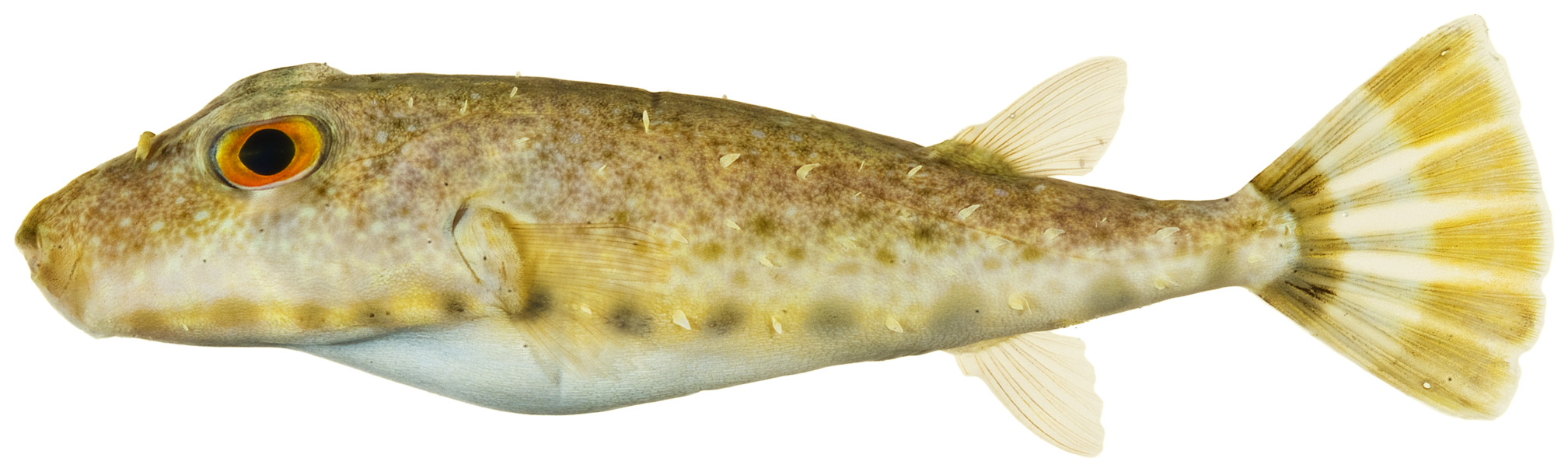
Sphoeroides spengleri.

Other fish that cause accidents in the region include the niquim (Thalassophryne), the catfish (Cathorops) and the scorpionfish (Scorpaena). Pufferfish poisoning has also been reported, although cases are more common in Japan, there are some cases recorded in the region, a study with species of the genus Sphoeroides, which occur throughout the region, showed that species of this genus, especially Sphoeroides spengleri, contains high levels of tetrodotoxin. In Brazil, an 11-month-old child died after pufferfish poisoning, the victim had symptoms one hour after ingestion, such as sweating, malaise, tingling and soft body, after two hours, had severe drooling, cyanosis and cardiorespiratory arrest, victim died even after resuscitation maneuvers.

== Cnidarian ==
Box jellyfish Dangerous cubozoa species in the region include Chiropsalmus quadrumanus, Tamoya haplonema and Alatina alata. Its venom contains dermonecrotic and neurotoxic activity, symptoms may include intense instantaneous local pain, nausea, vomiting, dyspnea, cardiac arrhythmias, acute pulmonary edema and death. The long tentacles of Chiropsalmus quadrumanus are armed with nematocysts, the purpose of which is to capture prey such as small fish and to deter predators. They can inflict an extremely painful sting on people that encounter them. There is a documented case of a four-year-old boy in the Gulf of Mexico dying within forty minutes of being stung. Of forty-nine people stung by jellyfish off the coast of Brazil over a five-year period, twenty were by identifiable species. Sixteen of these were identified as being caused by Chiropsalmus quadrumanus and four by the Portuguese man o' war (Physalia physalis). All these stings were linear in nature, causing both intense pain and systemic symptoms. Apart from pain, the symptoms include cardiac dysfunction and respiratory depression. The rash lasts for several months. Antivenom administered within a few hours relieves the pain somewhat, reduces the severity of the rash, and improves other symptoms. In extreme cases, cardiopulmonary resuscitation can be effective if started promptly.

Portuguese man o' war

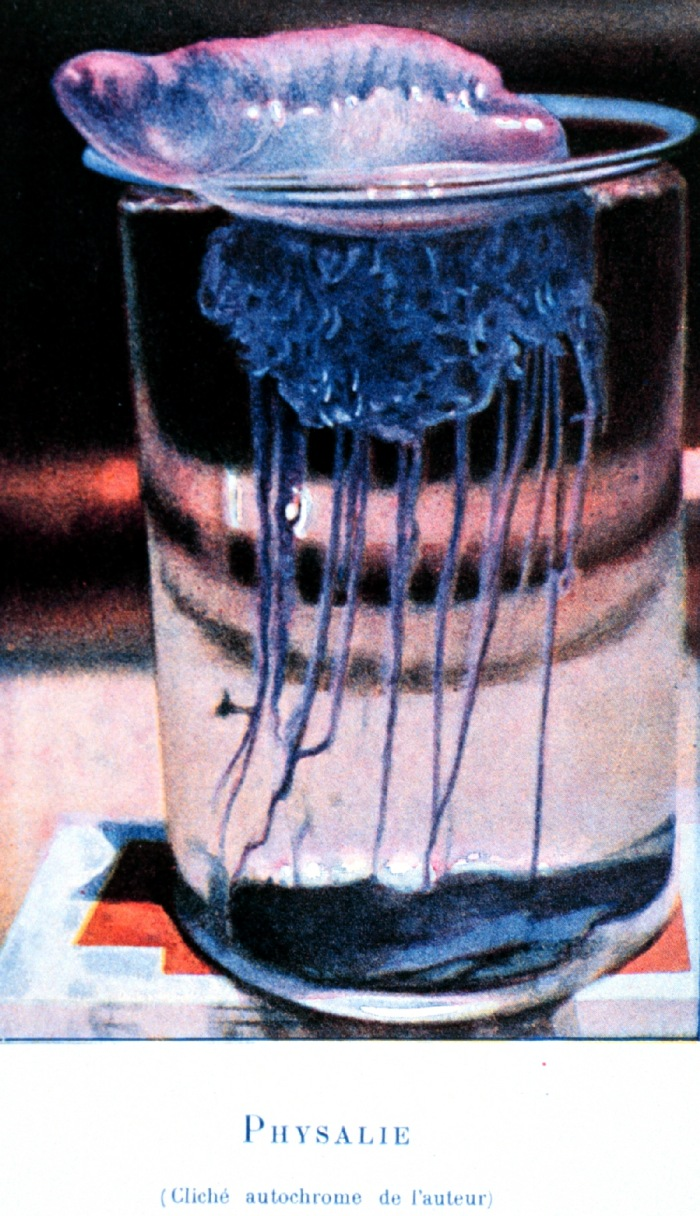
Physalia physalis.

The stinging, venom-filled nematocysts in the tentacles of the Portuguese man o' war can paralyze small fish and other prey. Detached tentacles and dead specimens (including those that wash up on shore) can sting just as painfully as the live organism in the water, and may remain potent for hours or even days after the death of the organism or the detachment of the tentacle.

Stings usually cause severe pain to humans, leaving whip-like, red welts on the skin that normally last two or three days after the initial sting, though the pain should subside after about 1 to 3 hours (depending on the biology of the person stung). However, the venom can travel to the lymph nodes and may cause symptoms that mimic an allergic reaction, including swelling of the larynx, airway blockage, cardiac distress, and an inability to breathe (though this is not due to a true allergy, which is defined by serum IgE). Other symptoms can include fever and shock, and in some extreme cases, even death, although this is extremely rare. Medical attention for those exposed to large numbers of tentacles may become necessary to relieve pain or open airways if the pain becomes excruciating or lasts for more than three hours, or if breathing becomes difficult. Instances where the stings completely surround the trunk of a young child are among those that have the potential to be fatal.

== Mollusks ==
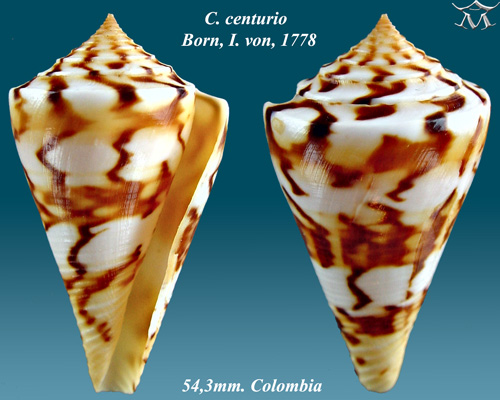
Conasprella centurio.

The molluscs of medical importance are those of the Conidae family, are present in tropical and subtropical waters, in the region, the species of greatest medical importance include Conasprella centurio, Conus clerii, Conasprella jaspidea, Conus regius, Conus dalli, Conus tessulatus and Conus spurius. At least two species feed on fish, such as Conus purpurascens and Conus ermineus. Fish-eating species are much more venomous and dangerous, however, even species that do not eat fish have been responsible for causing serious accidents. The venom of Conus is a conotoxin, whose action occurs by blocking muscle and neural receptors. Two cases were recorded by Conus regius, one in 1987, in Martinique, in a 46-year-old man, the second case occurred with a 42-year-old male diver in Salvador, Bahia, Brazil, there were no fatalities, with the two recovering without sequelae. Conus clerii has been implicated in causing accidents and some fatalities in its geographical area, which resulted in pain (sometimes excruciating), inflammation, swelling and cyanosis, some victims developed headaches, nausea, vomiting, breathing difficulties and / or impaired sight. Some cases of flaccid muscle paralysis have already been reported by this species, sometimes causing anaphylactic shock.

== Spiders and scorpions ==
Spiders of medical importance in Latin America belong to four genera:

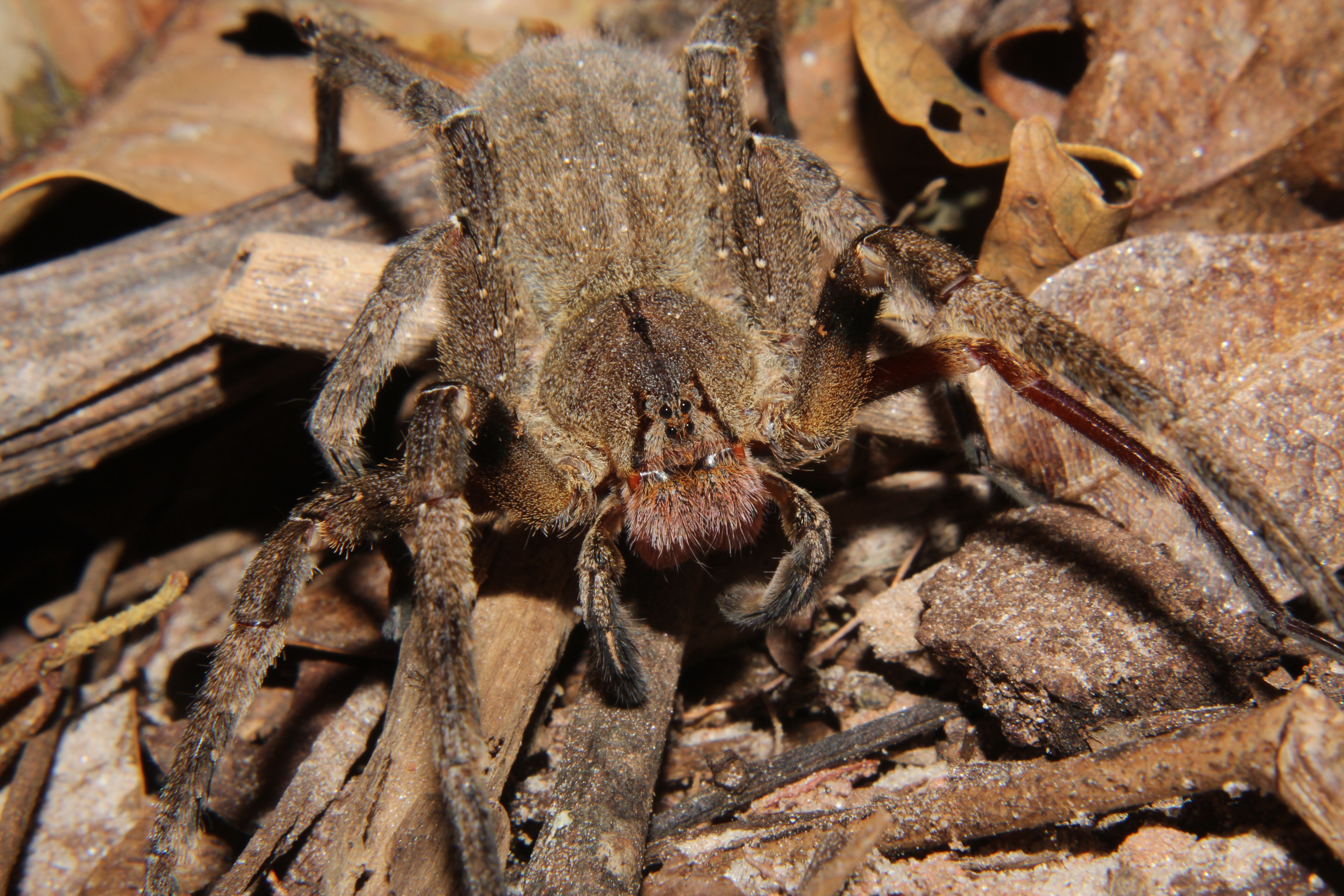
Phoneutria sp.

Brazilian wandering spiders (Phoneutria) with 9 species, these spiders grow 30–50 mm in length and 150 mm in wingspan, and are characterized by their aggressive behavior, in the 1970s, were responsible for 7,000 hospitalizations, only in Brazil, between 2007 and 2010, 18 deaths from Phoneutria nigriventer were registered, only in Brazil, Phoneutria fera is restricted to the Amazon and does not cause many accidents, however, 4 deaths were attributed to this species, even after the administration of the serum. Phoneutria nigriventer venom contains two fractions PhTx-1 and PhTx-2 which are potent for primates, however, the spider has only 1–2 mg, and usually delivers 0.4 mg.

Black widow (Latrodectus) with 10 species, Black widows are small, the female is only 12–16 mm long, while the males are 4 to 5 times smaller, accidents by these spiders are common, including in Argentina, but fatalities are extremely rare. In 2007, Brazil recorded a death (1.0%) and a recovery case with sequelae (1.0%).

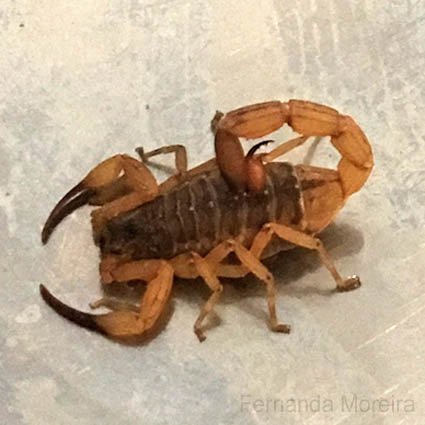
Tityus serrulatus

Brown recluse (Loxosceles) The recluse spiders are responsible for the majority of accidents, they are shy spiders that measure only 9 mm in length, they are very common in human habitations, including clothes, sheets and blankets, most accidents occur when the spider is compressed on the skin. Loxosceles laeta, Loxosceles intermedia and Loxosceles gaucho are the most toxic of the genus, especially Loxosceles laeta. The Chilean recluse was responsible for causing severe systemic reactions in 27.2% of cases in Peru, 15.7% in Chile and 13.1% in Santa Catarina, Brazil. In November 2019, two people died from a recluse spider bite, a 49-year-old man who received the treatment but did not resist due to kidney failure, in the other case, a woman died due to multiple organ failure. In Peru, a man had his ear and eyelid rotten, and suffered kidney and liver failure, after Loxosceles laeta bite. In Brazil, a 71-year-old woman developed severe visceral cutaneous loxoscelism, presented hyperemic lesion, pain, edema and severe hematuria. During hospitalization, she developed serious systemic effects, such as intravascular hemolytic anemia evidenced by hyperbilirubinemia, direct bilirubin, low levels of hemoglobin and hematocrit, elevated transaminases, leukocytosis with neutrophilia, creatine kinase increase, metabolic acidosis and hematuria. The patient received 5 ampoules of serum, but the condition worsened, with sepsis, acute renal failure, 5 more ampoules of serum were administered, mechanical ventilation, dialysis treatment that lasted for 3 months. Due to necrosis, debridement and healing were required, the patient showed a good improvement. In another case, a 24-year-old patient in Brazil developed sepsis, renal and hepatic failure, disseminated intravascular coagulation and necrotizing fasciitis of the lower limbs, despite his serious condition, the victim recovered. In Curitiba, Paraná, Brazil, in a period from 1989-1990, 923 cases were recorded, of which 46.6% (732) required serotherapy. The accidents occurred in urban areas of the city and L. intermedia was reported as the most prevalent species.

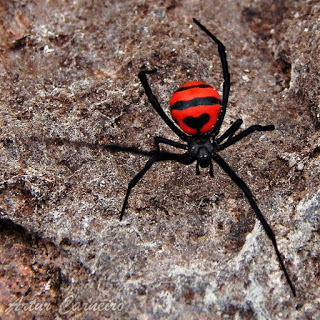
Latrodectus curacaviensis.

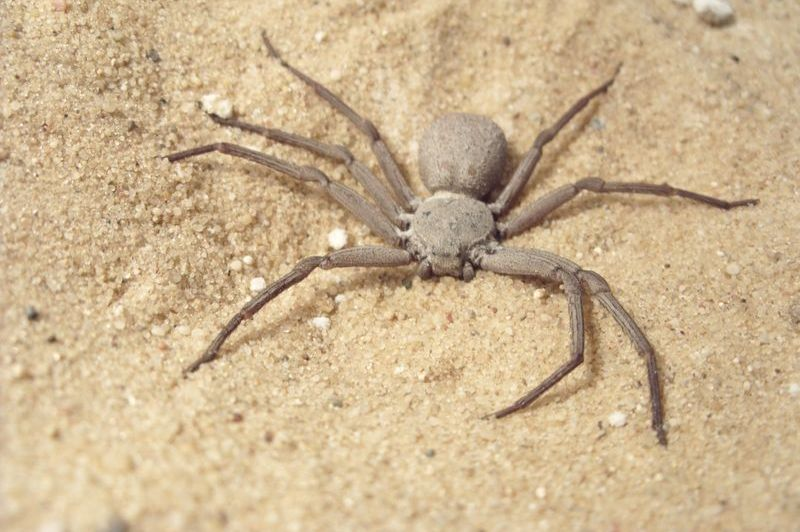
Sicarius sp.

Six eyed sand spider (Sicarius) The Sicarius genus is composed of 21 species, which are known for their burying behavior, accidents with these spiders are extremely rare, only one case has been officially confirmed, which resulted in a dermonecrotic lesion caused by Sicarius tropicus. Sicarius ornatus, as well as Sicarius thomisoides are the species that has the highest potential to cause severe envenoming.

Scorpions

The scorpions of medical importance in the region belong to the genera Tityus (genus) and Centruroides, in 2017, Brazil recorded 184 deaths by scorpions, compared with 105 caused by snakes and 30 by spiders. All fatal cases are attributed to the genus Tityus, including the Brazilian yellow scorpion (Tityus serrulatus). Mexico, along with Brazil, has the highest numbers, every year, there are 250,000 cases in Mexico, with fatalities attributed to the genus Centruroides, about 8 species of this genus are considered dangerous, among which include the nayarit scorpion (Centruroides noxius). Species attributed to serious accidents include Centruroides infamatus, Centruroides limpidus, Centruroides tecomanus, Centruroides suffusus, Centruroides noxius and Centruroides sculpturatus (Mexico and Central America), twenty species of the genus Tityus are of medical importance, including Tityus discrepans, Tityus zulianus and Tityus nororientalis (Venezuela), Tityus trinitatis (Trinidad and Tobago), Tityus pachyurus, Tityus asthenes and Tityus fuhrman (Colombia), Tityus serrulatus, Tityus stigmurus and Tityus bahiensis (southeastern Brazil), Tityus metuendus and Tityus obscurus (Brazilian Amazon, French Guiana and Guyana), and Tityus trivittatus and Tityus confluens (Argentina).

== Wasps and bees ==
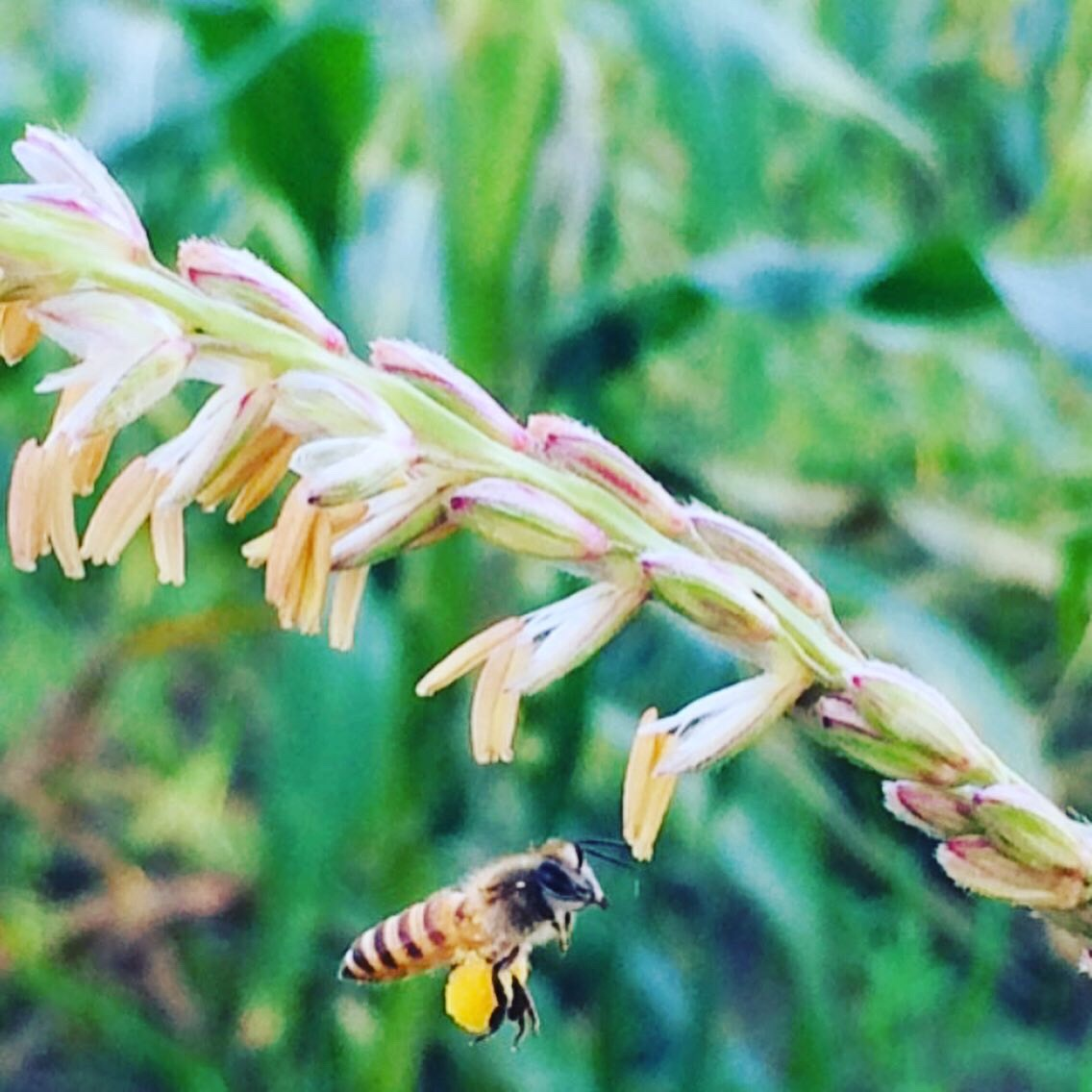
Africanized honey bee.

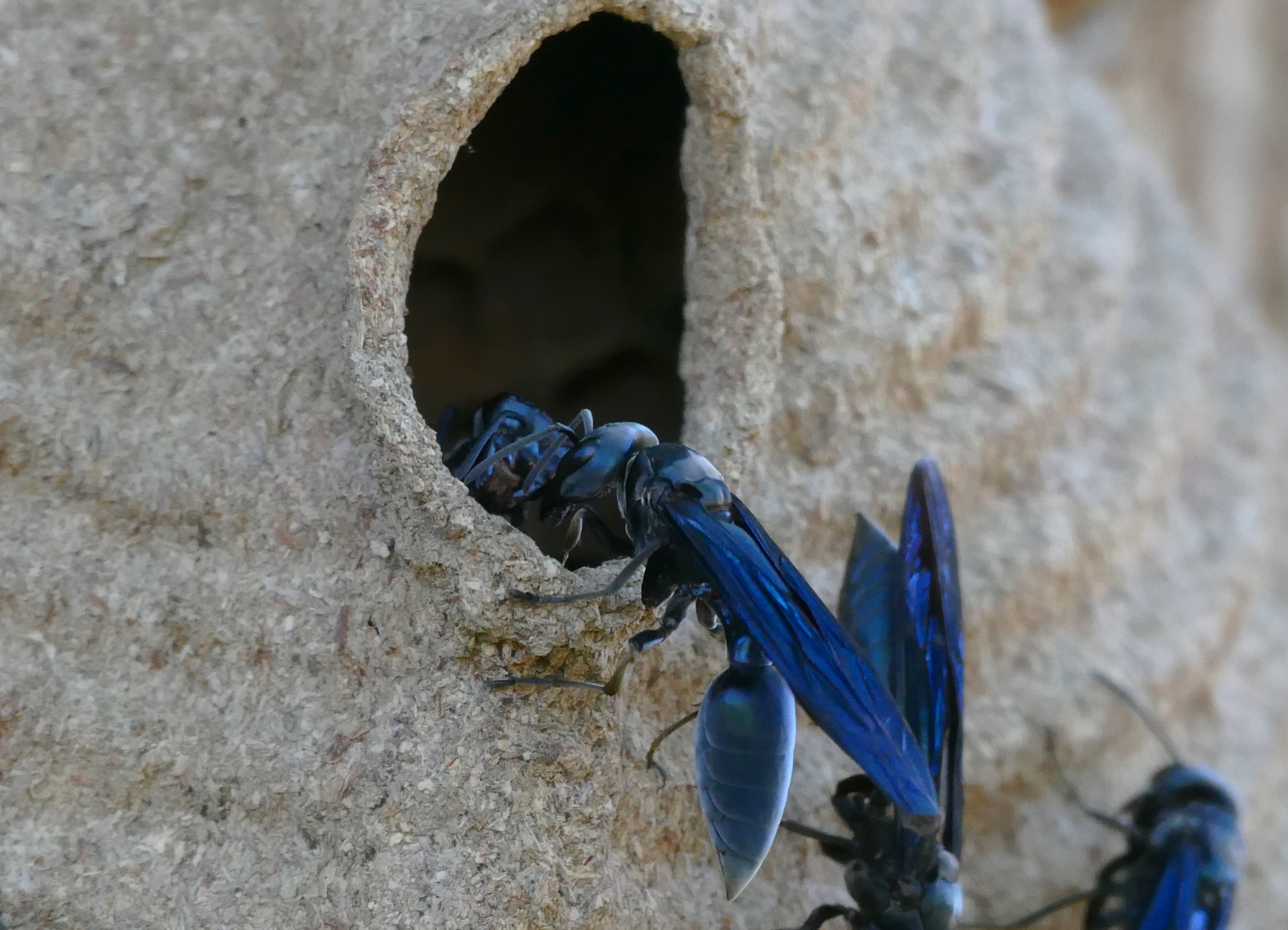
Synoeca cyanea.

Bees are a common cause of insect accidents in the region, most accidents are caused by the Africanized bee, in Brazil alone, from January to November 2018, 18,800 accidents were recorded, every half hour, a person is attacked by bees in Brazil, of these cases, 800 required hospitalization, according to the latest data from 2016, there were 76 deaths, only in Brazil. Social wasps of the Synoeca, Agelaia and Polistes genera are known for their extremely painful stings, however, stings are more dangerous if the victim develops an allergic reaction. S. cyanea venom is strong enough to cause haemolytic activity. Rhabdomyolysis and hemorrhage may also occur. In mice, abdominal spasms, ataxia, defecation, dyspnoea, hyperactivity, hypoactivity, sweating, and throes were observed following venom injection. S. cyanea venom also contains some antibacterial activity. Human accidents with wasps can occur one of two ways. Either a human may receive no more than one or two stings, or a swarm may attack a human. Symptoms following the attack can range from inflammatory reactions to severe allergic reactions resulting in anaphylactic shock. In some cases, death may occur following several bites and a large amount of venom injection; however, a wasp sting typically will not produce a reaction more severe than local symptoms that affect only the skin.

== Caterpillars ==
The most serious accidents are caused by caterpillars of the genus Lonomia, especially Lonomia obliqua and Lonomia achelous. Lonomia obliqua has a toxic venom which causes disseminated intravascular coagulation and a consumptive coagulopathy, which can lead to a hemorrhagic syndrome. The toxins are stored in sacks at the base of each spine. As the spines penetrate the victim, venom flows through the hollow bristles and into the puncture wound.

It was discovered that the toxin in the caterpillar's skin held potent anti-clotting agents. This anti-clotting agent would attach to another protein of the body's cells and cause them to leak as blood is unable to clot. This internal bleeding would fill the surrounding tissue with "bruised blood". This internal bleeding spreads through the internal organs and eventually leads to compression and brain death. This accounts for the minimum of 500 deaths resulting from contact with L. obliqua caterpillars. The poison only takes effect in fairly large amounts; in order to experience the extreme effects caused by the toxins, a human victim would probably need to be stung at least 20 to 100 times because each sting only injects a minute amount of venom.

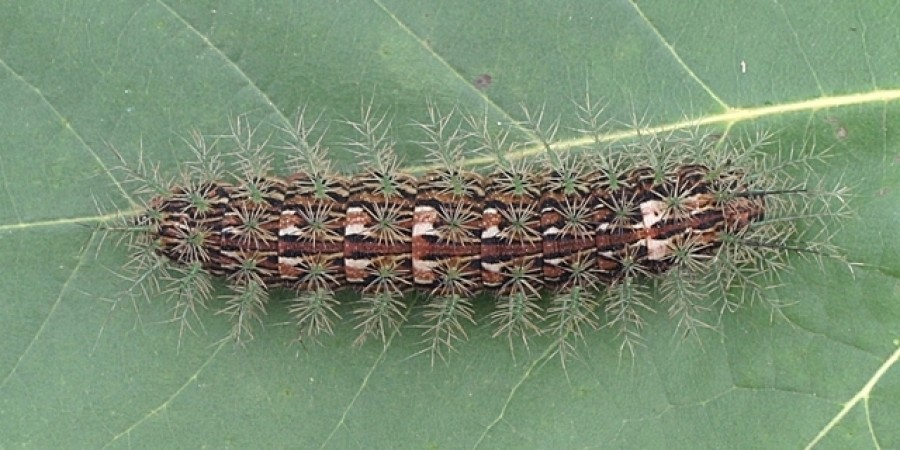
Lonomia obliqua, Brazil.

Of the 26 species of the genus Lonomia found on the American continent, only Lonomia obliqua and Lonomia achelous have caused severe reactions, leading to hemorrhagic syndrome. Since 1989 the number of human accidents caused by these caterpillars has been increasing in the southern region of Brazil. Most victims were male (63%), many were between 0 and 19 years old (45%), and lesions are especially common on the hands (38%). The reported death rate is 2.5%. Disseminated intravascular coagulation occurs as the toxin interacts with the victim's body. One serious effect on envenomed victims is hemorrhage syndrome. "First described by Arocha-Pinango and Layrisse in Venezuela in 1967, the hemorrhagic diathesis caused in humans by touching the Lonomia species begins with inflammatory changes at the site of envenoming, followed by systemic symptoms such as headache, fever, vomiting, and malaise. After 24 hours, a severe bleeding disorder ensues, leading to ecchymosis, hematuria, pulmonary, and intracranial hemorrhages, and acute kidney injury.

== Frogs and toads ==
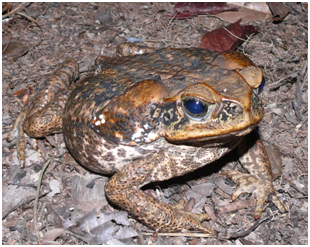
Rhinella marina.

Poisoning with frogs in humans is rare and is restricted to dogs and cats, the species of the Bufonidae family are mainly involved in these cases, they have parotid glands located in the region posterior to the eye socket, they produce and store a white and mucous liquid, accidents occur when dogs bite frogs, releasing the poison that comes into contact with the oral mucosa, symptoms include hyperglycemia, hyperemic mucosa, apathy, vomiting, anxiety, blindness, and death from ventricular fibrillation.

Poison dart frog

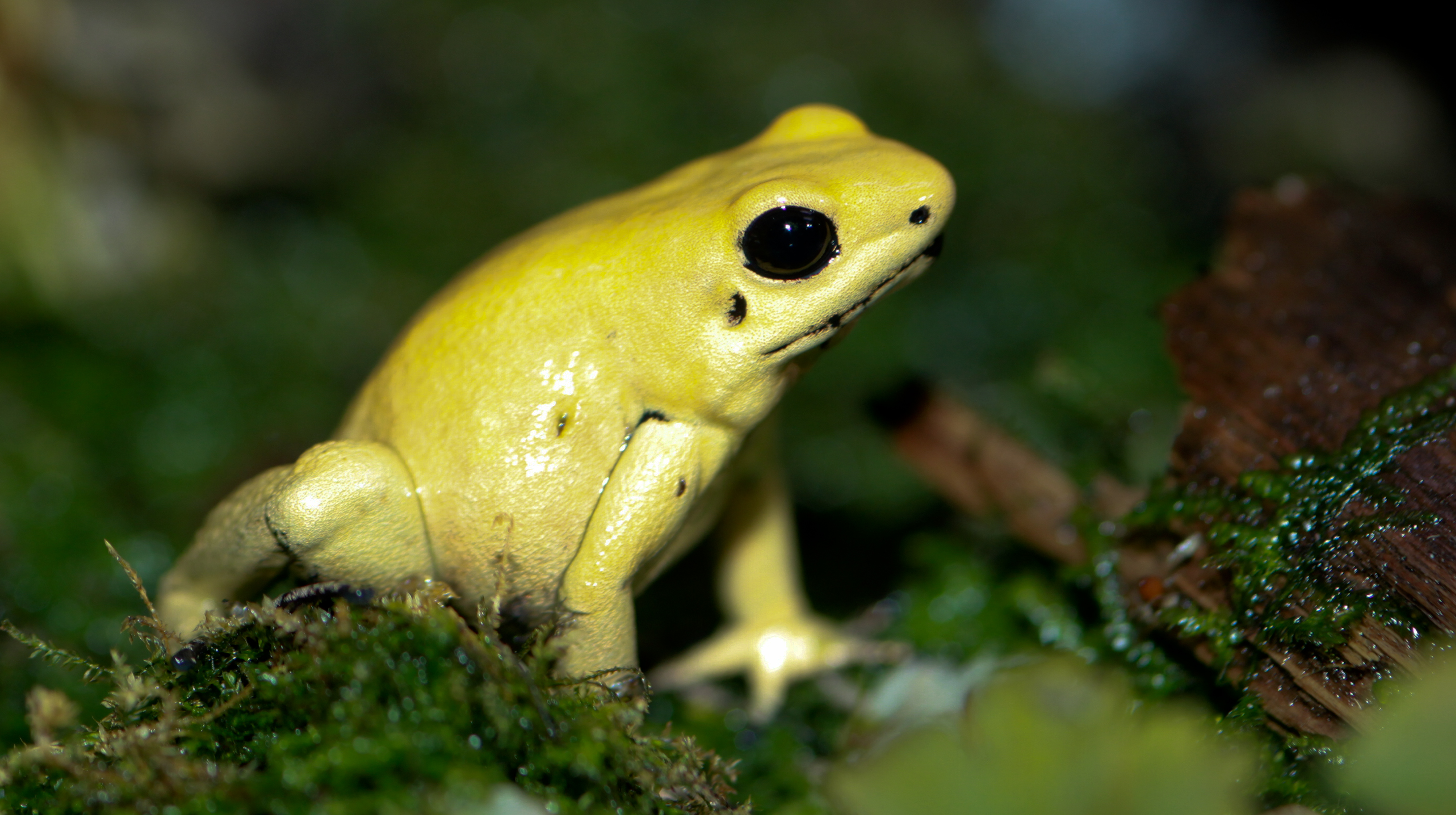
Golden dart frog.

Many poison dart frogs secrete lipophilic alkaloid toxins such as allopumiliotoxin 267A, batrachotoxin, epibatidine, histrionicotoxin, and pumiliotoxin 251D through their skin. Alkaloids in the skin glands of poison frogs serve as a chemical defense against predation, and they are therefore able to be active alongside potential predators during the day. About 28 structural classes of alkaloids are known in poison frogs. The most toxic of poison dart frog species is Phyllobates terribilis. It is argued that dart frogs do not synthesize their poisons, but sequester the chemicals from arthropod prey items, such as ants, centipedes and mites – the diet-toxicity hypothesis. The golden poison frog's skin is densely coated in an alkaloid toxin, one of a number of poisons common to dart frogs (batrachotoxins). This poison prevents its victim's nerves from transmitting impulses, leaving the muscles in an inactive state of contraction, which can lead to heart failure or fibrillation. Alkaloid batrachotoxins can be stored by frogs for years after the frog is deprived of a food-based source, and such toxins do not readily deteriorate, even when transferred to another surface. Subcutaneous doses like 0.1 μg result in seizures, salivation, muscle contractions, dyspnoea and death in mice, the subcutaneous LD50 is 0.2 μg / kg, however, low doses like 0.01 μg / kg and 0.02 μg / kg have been shown to be lethal. Myers et al, estimates that the dose that kills humans is between 2.0 and 7.5 μg.

Saddleback toad

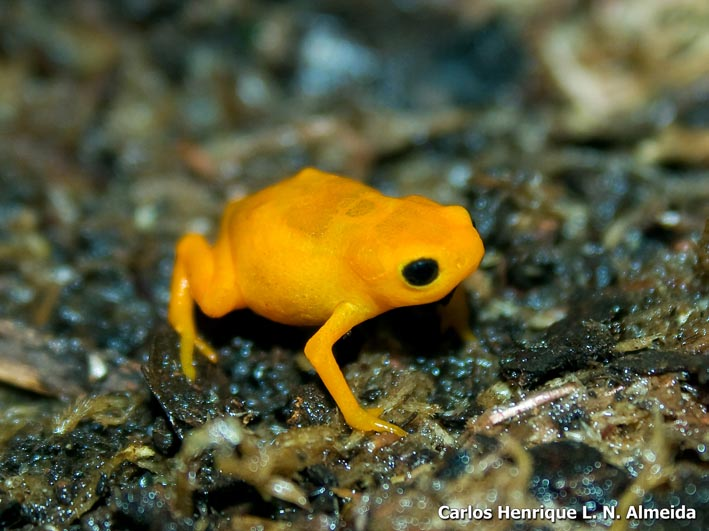
Brachycephalus ephippium.

The bright yellow, orange or reddish colours of many species in this genus are generally considered aposematic (warning colours), but toxicity has only been studied in a few species. The brightly coloured B. ephippium and B. pernix have tetrodotoxin and similar toxins in their skin and organs, whereas B. nodoterga, which has a much more subdued colouring but still with some yellow-orange, appears to be non-toxic. It is unknown how certain Brachycephalus species attain the strong neurotoxins, but they are possibly absorbed from the small invertebrates they eat, as known from some poison dart frogs and mantella frogs, or produced by bacteria inside their body. 11-oxoTTX (11-oxotetrodotoxin), an isolated analogue of Brachycephalus ephippium is extremely rare to be found in other animals, even marine animals, this analogue is considered four to five times more potent than the tetrodotoxin itself. Other analogues isolated of this toad include the tetrodonic acid, 4-epipetrodotoxin, 4.9 anhydrotetrodotoxin and 11-nortetrodotoxin.

Harlequin toad

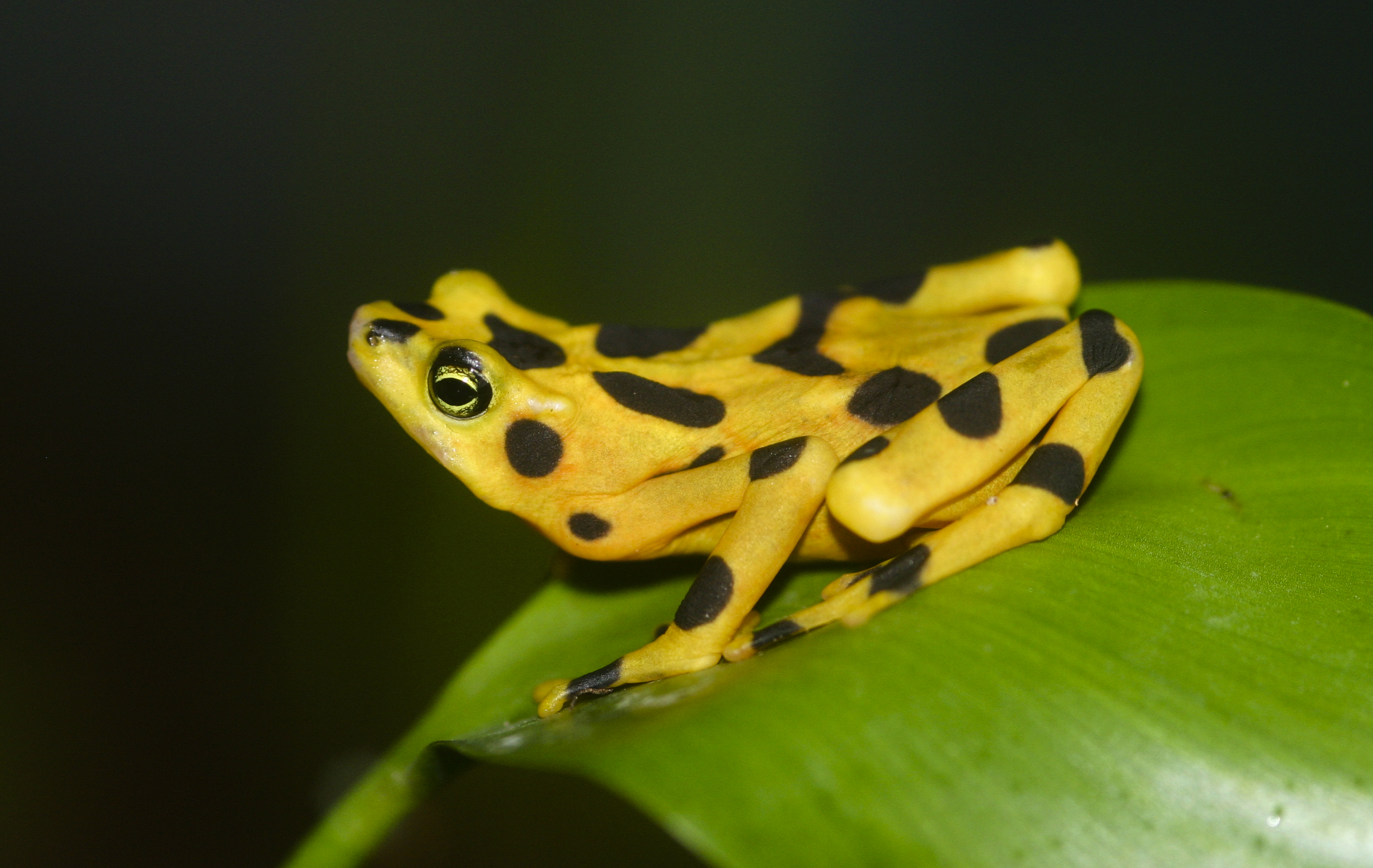
Atelopus zeteki.

Harlequin frogs are small amphibians endemic to Central and South America. They are characterized by their bright colors like yellow, green, brown, black, blue or purple, which are aposematic colors, to alert predators that they are toxic. The most known species is the Panamanian golden frog, The skin colour ranges from light yellow-green to bright gold, with some individuals exhibiting black spots on their backs and legs. Females are generally larger than males; females typically range from 45 to 63 mm (1.8 to 2.5 in) in length and 4 to 15 g (0.14 to 0.53 oz) in weight, with males between 35 and 48 millimetres (1.4 and 1.9 in) in length and 3 and 12 grams (0.11 and 0.42 oz) in weight. The Panamanian golden frog has a variety of toxins, including steroidal bufadienolides and guanidinium alkaloids of the tetrodotoxin class. One of the latter, zetekitoxin AB, has been found to be a blocker of voltage-dependent sodium channels several orders of magnitude more potent than its analog saxitoxin. Their toxin is water-soluble and affects the nerve cells of anyone who comes in contact with it. Panamanian golden frogs use this toxin to protect themselves from most predators.Due to the risk of testing the poison on humans, it has been done with mice. Large doses can be fatal in 20 or 30 minutes. Death is preceded by clonic (grand mal) convulsions until the functions of the circulatory and respiratory systems cease. ZTX is an extremely potent neurotoxin isolated of the Panamanian golden frog. The LD_{50} of ZTX in mice is 11 μg/kg.

== See also ==
- Snakebites in Latin America
- List of fatal snake bites in Australia
- Animal attacks in Australia
- List of fatal snake bites in the United States
