= Snakebite in Latin America =

Snake Attacks Causing Health Concern

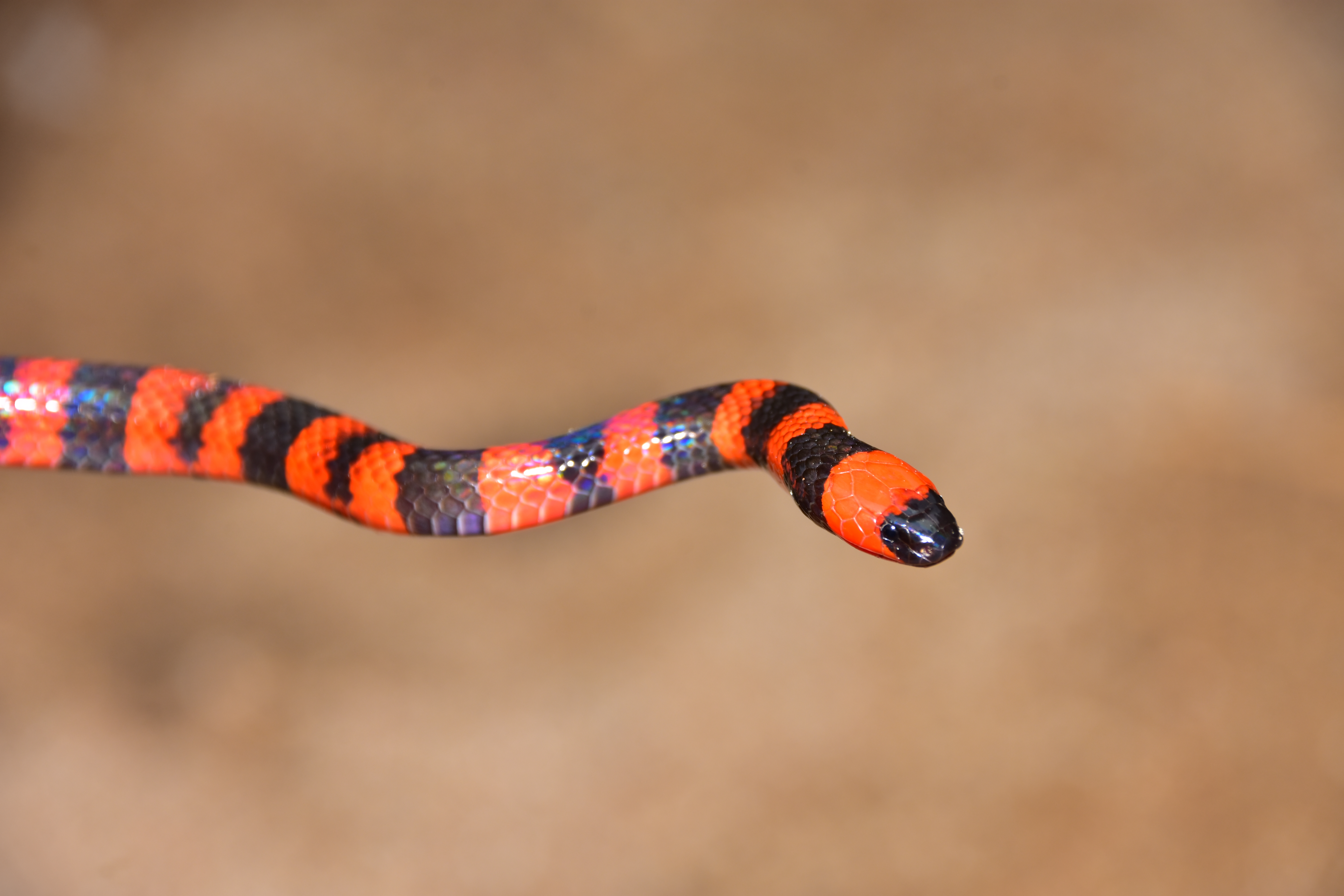
Ruatan coral snake.

Snakebite envenomation is considered a public health problem in Latin America, with an estimated 70,000 cases annually, but due to underreporting, these numbers may be even higher.

== Epidemiological aspect ==
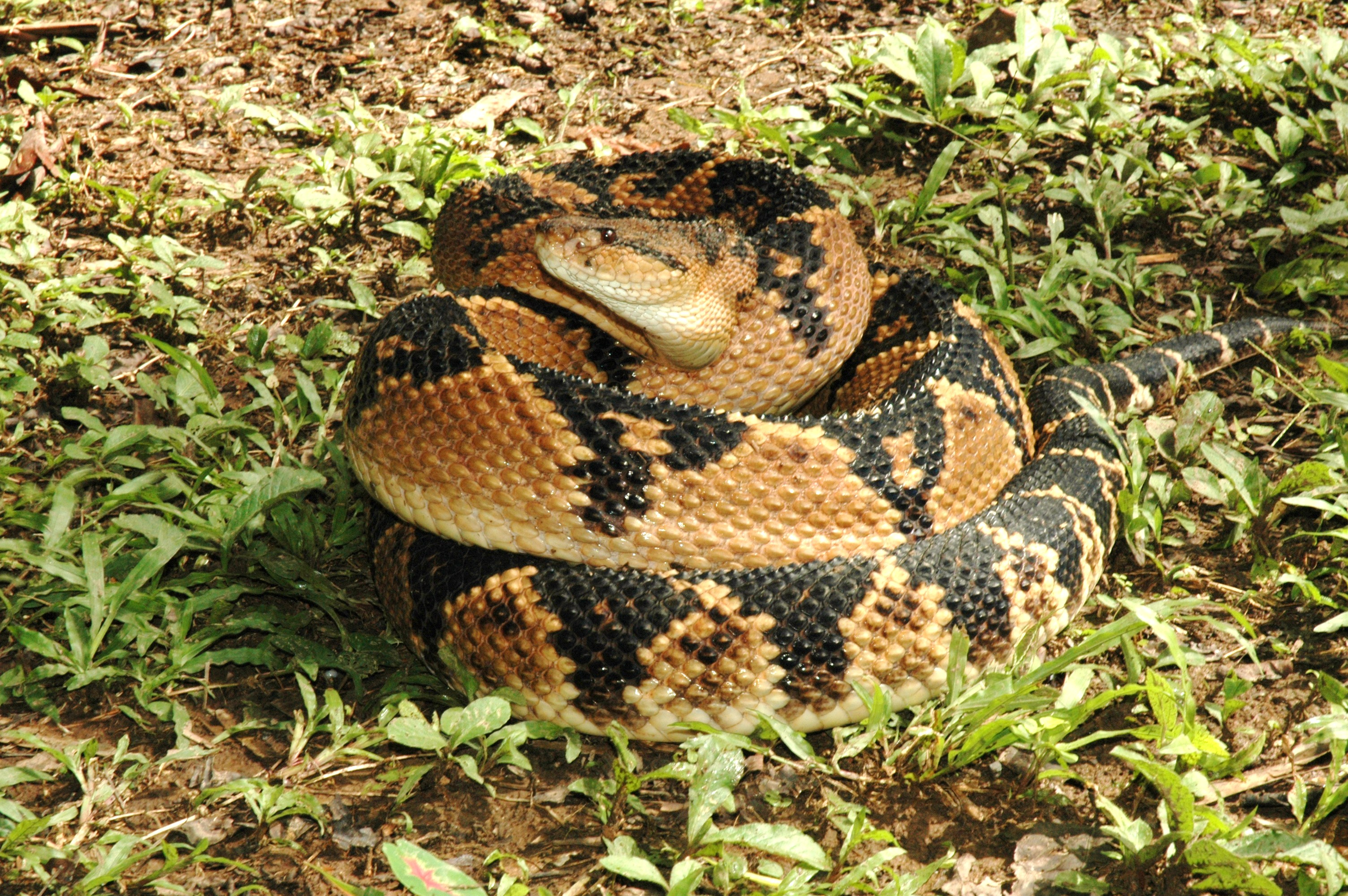
South American bushmaster (Lachesis muta).

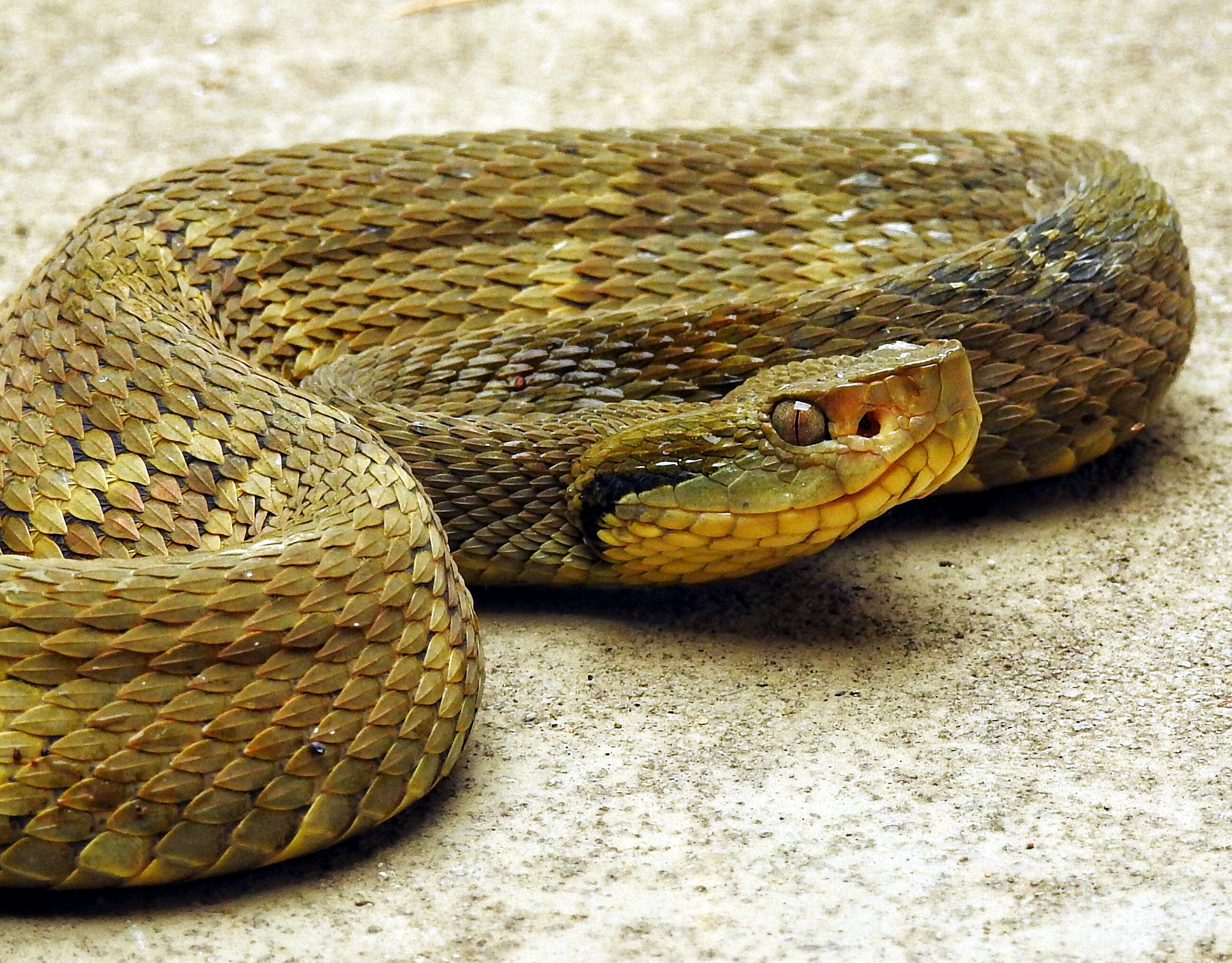
Jararaca pit viper(Bothrops jararaca).

People most affected are those who live in poor agricultural areas, most often with men and young people, although accidents occur with all ages, with most bites occurring on the feet and hands. Most accidents happen during rainy periods, when agricultural activities are started. Indigenous communities are also vulnerable due to difficult access to health centers. In Central America, Panama records the highest number of annual bites, around 2,000. In South America it is Brazil, registering 26,000 to 29,000, second to Venezuela with 7,000, and Colombia with 4,000. Brazil and Costa Rica apparently have higher lethality rates, 0.42% and 0.5% respectively.

== Most important species ==
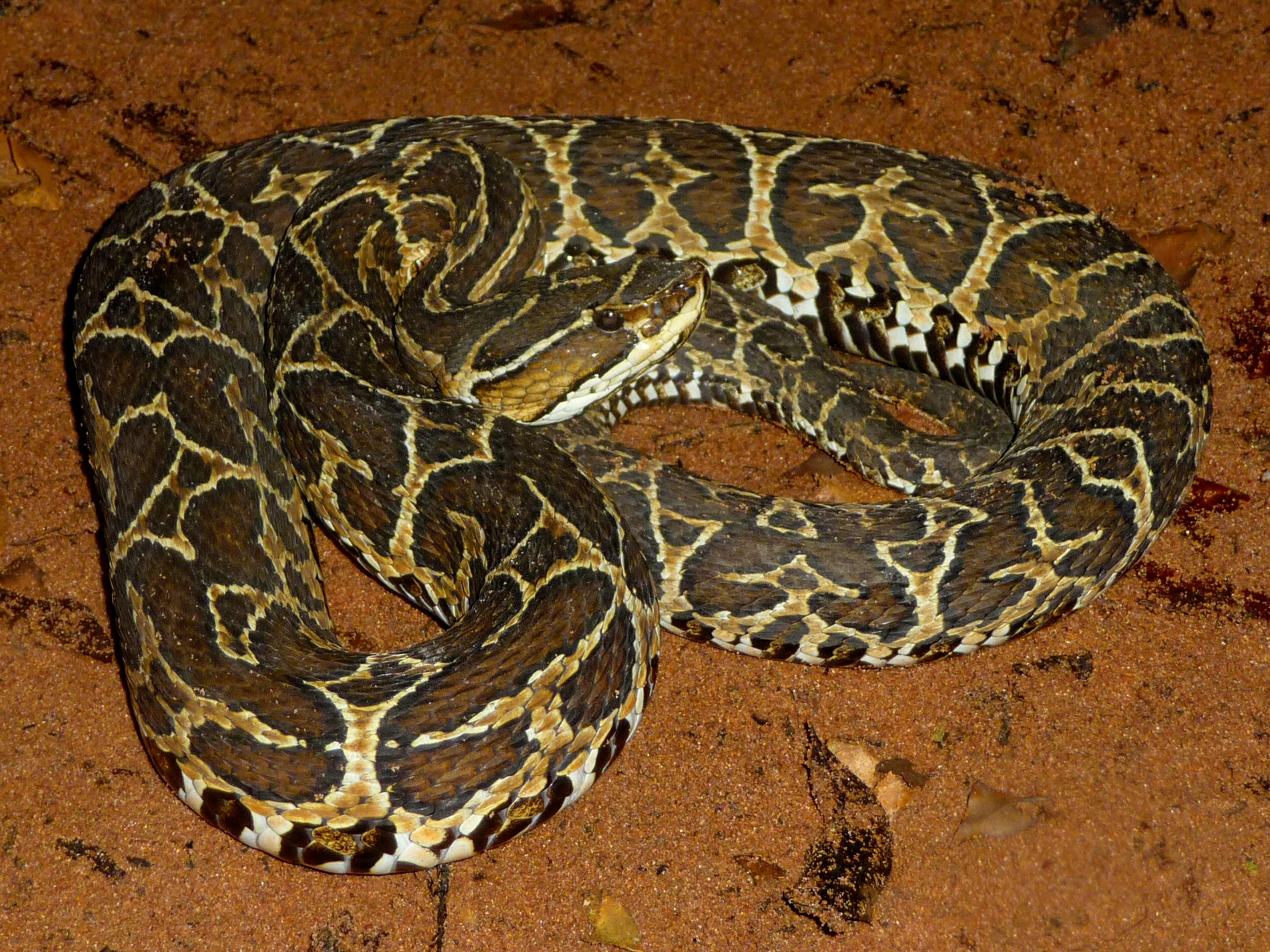
Urutu pit viper.

Most incidents are caused by snakes of the family Viperidae (Bothrops and Crotalus mainly) with 138 species of viperidae in Latin America. In Brazil, 70-90% of accidents are caused by Bothrops species. The most important are Bothrops asper, known as the fer-de-lance or terciopelo, found in Mexico, Central America and northern South America; Bothrops atrox or common lancehead, endemic to the Amazon; and Bothrops jararaca found in Brazil, Argentina and Paraguay. Other important species in South America include B. alternatus, B. moojeni, B. neuwied and B. jararacussu. In Brazil, the mortality rate reported by Bothrops is 0.39%, while that of rattlesnakes is 0.98%. Few accidents are caused by bushmasters (Lachesis spp.), but the mortality rate is high.

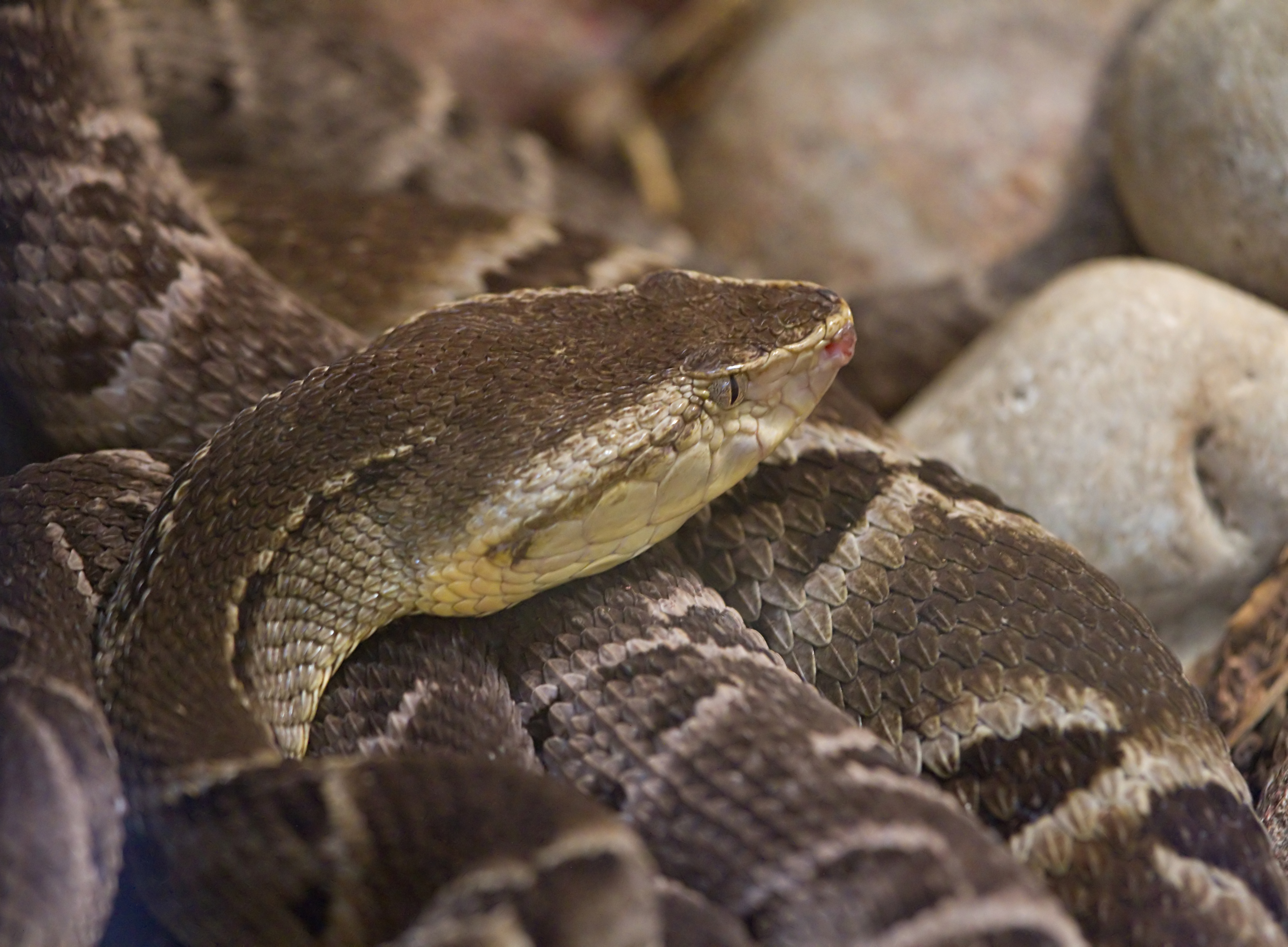
Bothrops moojeni.

Few accidents are caused by the 78 elapid species in Latin America, which are represented by coral snakes, of the genera Micruroides (Mexico) and Micrurus (the most widely distributed), as well as sea snakes, such as the yellow-bellied sea snake (Mexico, Central America, and northern South America). Elapids represent only 1-2% of incidents in the region, primarily from coral snake species Micrurus nigrocinctus, M. mipartitus, M. lemniscatus, M. frontalis, M. corallinus, and M. spixii, while bites from the sea snake Hydrophis platurus are extremely rare.

== Venom ==
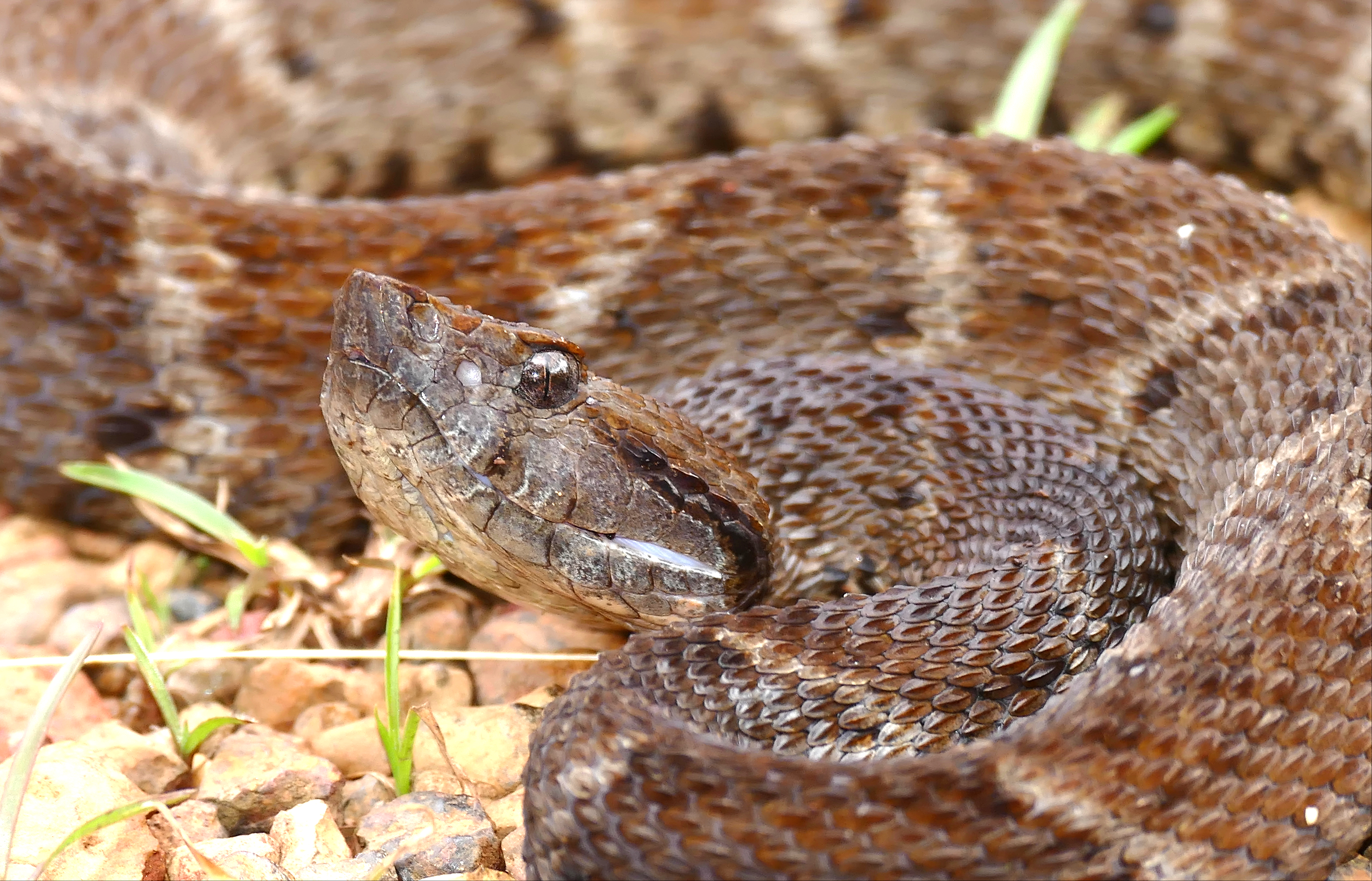
Common lancehead (Bothrops atrox).

Bothrops venom is composed of coagulating, anticoagulant, hemorrhagic, hemotoxic and cytotoxic agents. It also contains myotoxins. The South American rattlesnake (Crotalus durissus) has neurotoxins, myotoxins and coagulants. While that of Bushmaster, has proteolytic, coagulant, hemorrhagic and neurotoxic activity. Coral snake venom is a potent neurotoxin, causing the neuromuscular block. The yellow-bellied sea snake is extremely venomous, the venom of which contains neurotoxins and myotoxins.

== Signs and symptoms ==
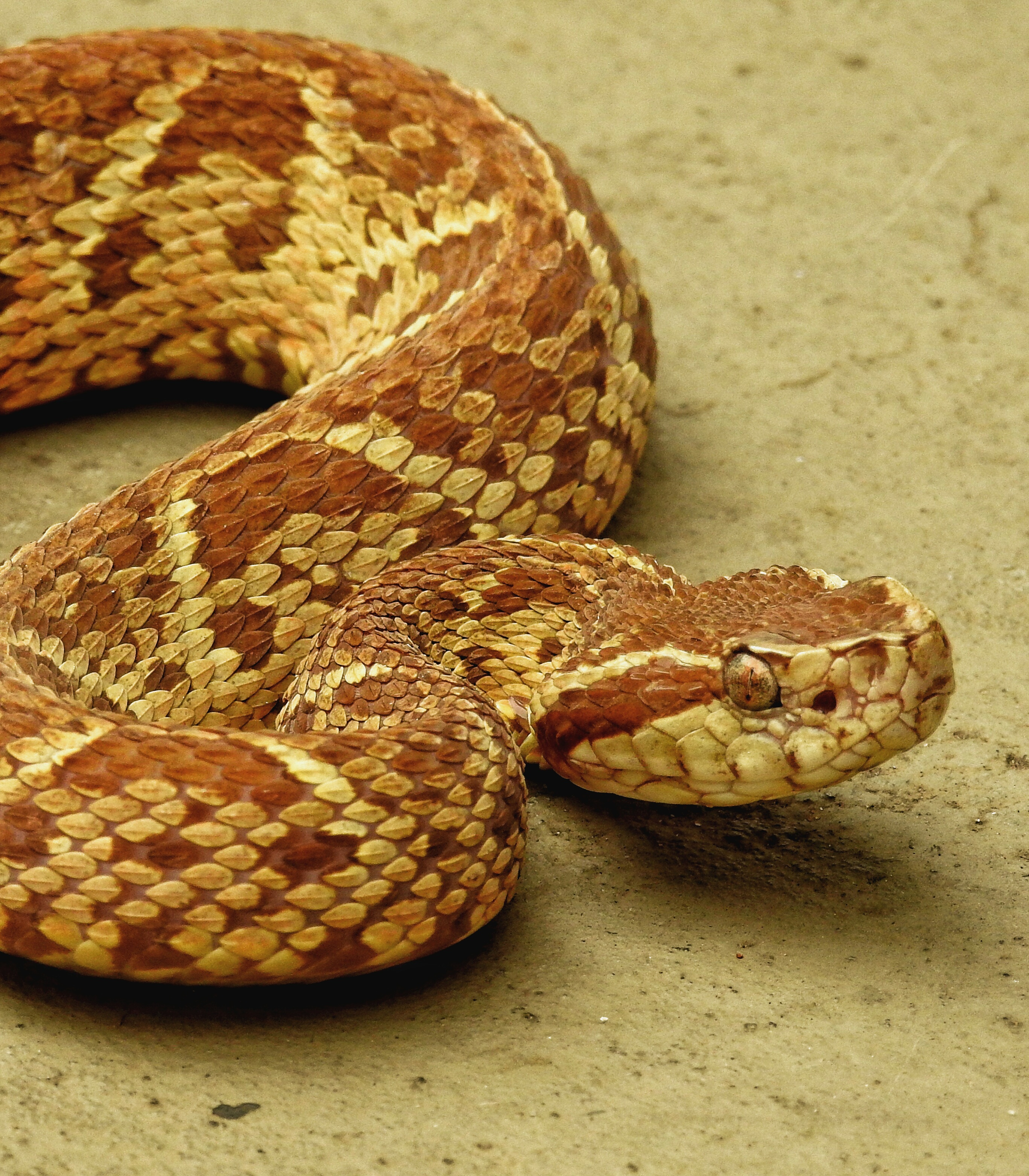
Jararacussu (Bothrops jararacussu)

Bothrops venom is mainly composed of proteolytic, coagulant, and hemorrhagic activity, causing several symptoms, such as pain, swelling, severe bruising, blisters, and local bleeding (hemorrhage), in severe cases, tissue death can lead to amputation. Systemic effects include severe bleeding, absence of urine production, nausea, vomiting, and low blood pressure, which may lead to shock. Complications such as kidney failure, sepsis, disseminated intravascular coagulation, and bleeding in the brain are the main causes of death

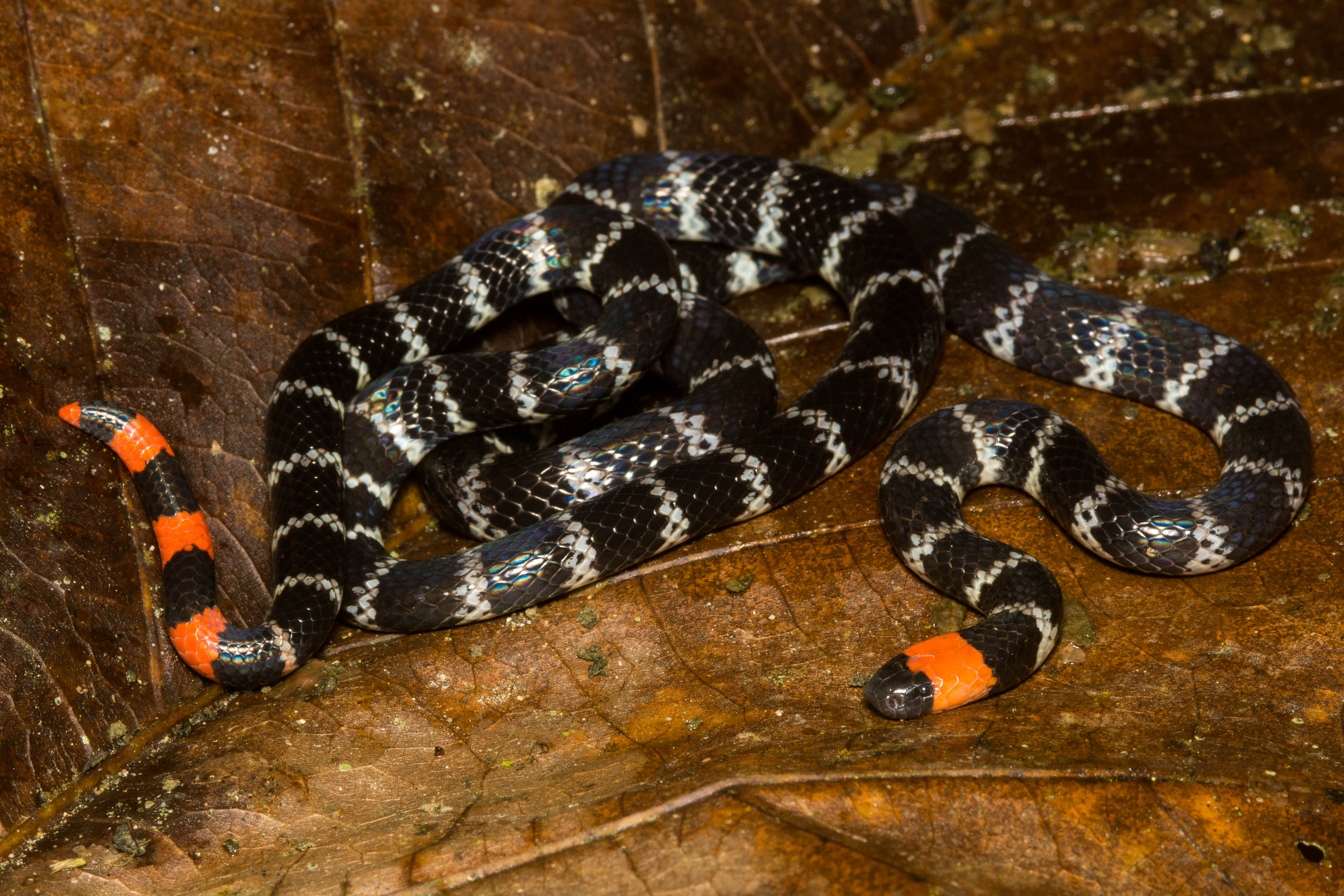
Redtail coral snake (Micrurus mipartitus).

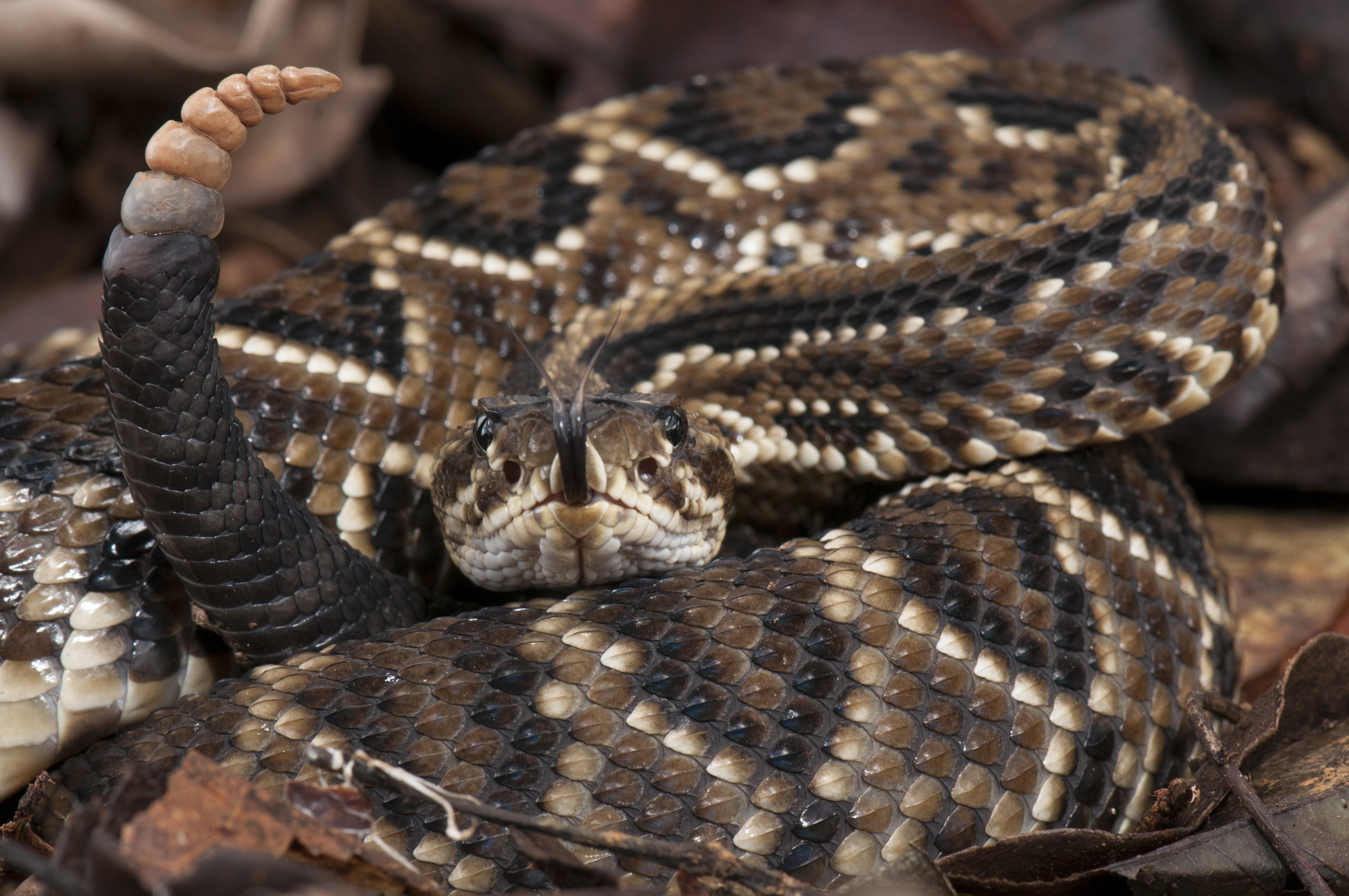
South American rattlesnake (Crotalus durissus).

The venom of the South American rattlesnake has three activities, neurotoxic, myotoxic, and low coagulant activity, neurotoxic symptoms are characterized by ptosis, flaccidity of the facial muscles, diplopia, ophthalmoplegia, in rare cases velopalatine paralysis occurs, the myotoxic action is responsible for causing generalized rhabdomyolysis, with muscle pain and myoglobinuria, the coagulant action results in blood being unable to coagulate, and slight gingival bleeding, other manifestations influence malaise, tiredness, sweat, vomiting, nausea, feeling of dry mouth and sleepy aspect. The main complications include acute tubular necrosis with kidney failure and respiratory paralysis.

Lachesis's bite is rare but serious, due to the high amounts it injects, the manifestations are similar to Bothrops, at the site of the bite there is pain and edema, hemorrhagic bubbles, vesicles, and necrosis. Systemic effects include visual disturbances, dizziness, low blood pressure and heart rate, abdominal pain, and diarrhea. In the location of the bite, in severe cases, compartment syndrome, necrosis, secondary infection, obsessions, and functional deficit may occur.

Symptoms of coral bites can appear in less than an hour or more, at the site the symptoms are mild, with mild pain and paresthesia, systemic manifestations include progressive loss of muscle strength, vomiting, ptosis, ophthalmoplegia, and myasthenic facies. Generalized muscle pain may occur, velopalatine paralysis, which results in difficulty in swallowing, and in more severe cases, flaccid paralysis of the respiratory muscles, resulting in severe respiratory failure, with death occurring quickly.

The venom of Hydrophis platurus causes damage to skeletal muscle, resulting in myoglobinuria, neuromuscular paralysis, and kidney damage.

== Other important species ==
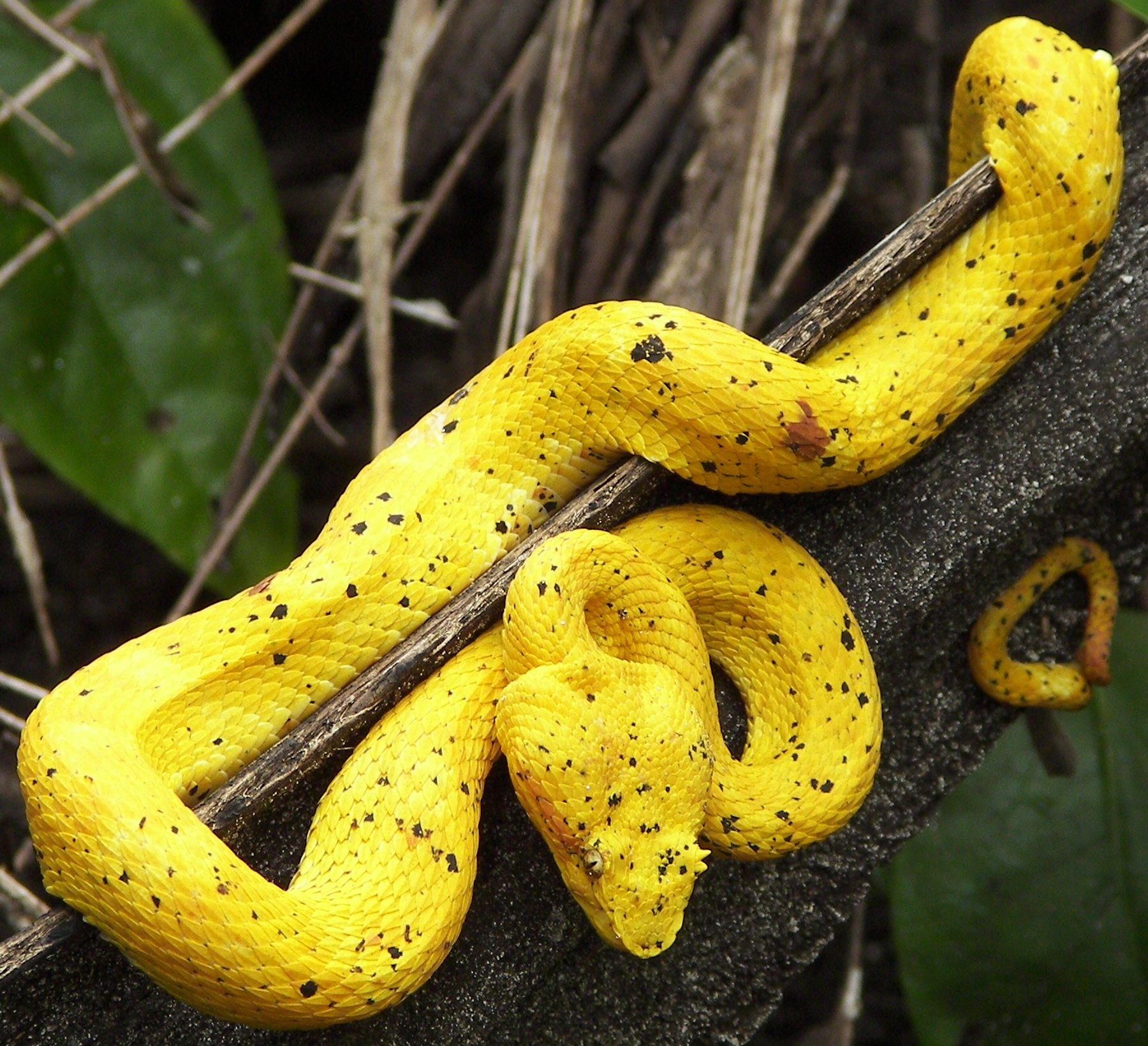
Eyelash pit viper (Bothriechis schlegelii).

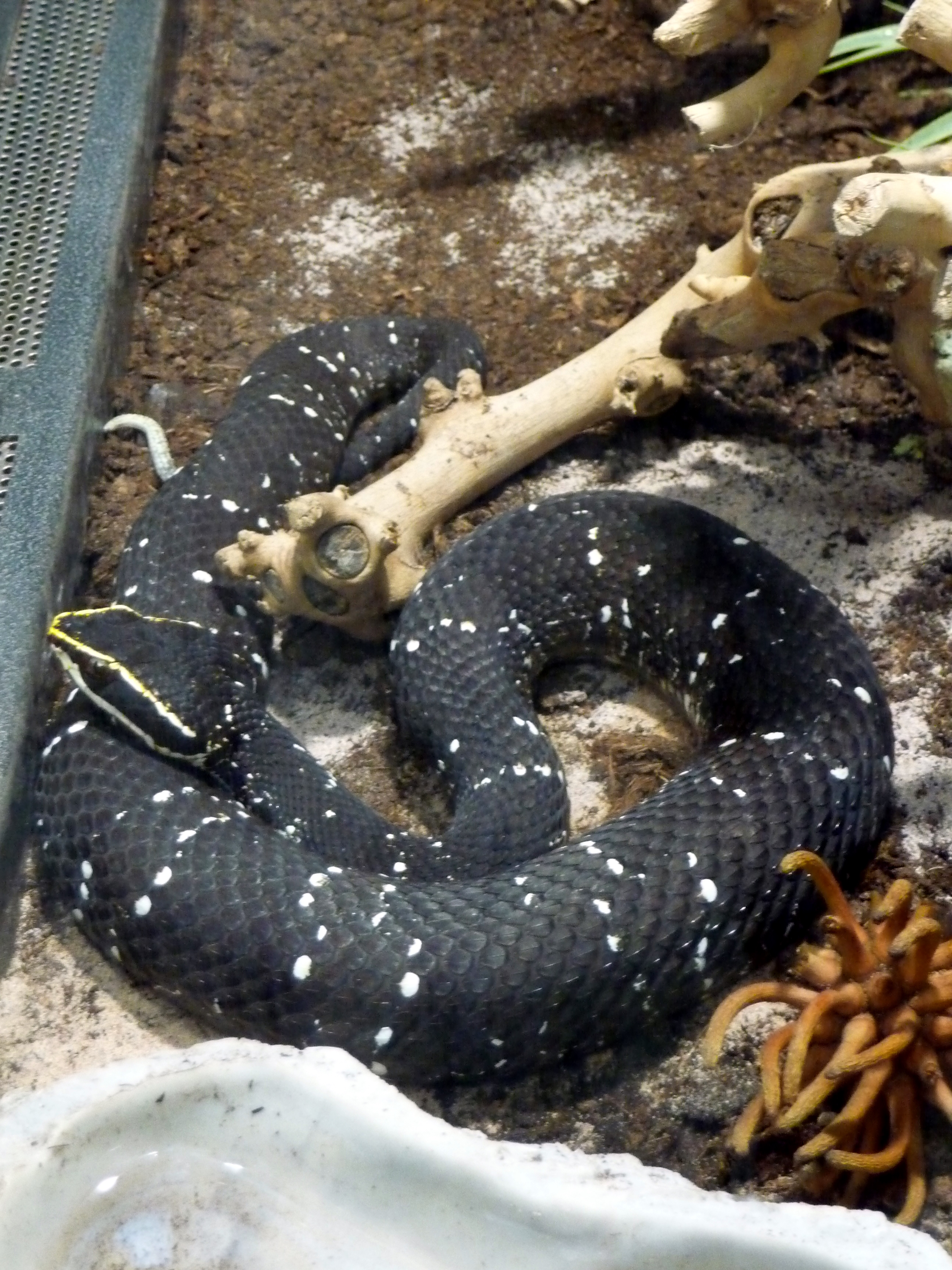
Cantil (Agkistrodon bilineatus).

Other genera of medical importance include Bothriechis (palm vipers), which are of arboreal habits, and found in Mexico, Central America and northern South America.It has a venom of hemotoxic activity, causing local damage, such as severe pain, blisters, bruises and even gangrene. B. schlegelii is the most widespread and venomous of Bothriechis genus, with hypotensive, procoagulant, neurotoxic, myotoxic and hemorrhagic activity, symptoms include local pain, swelling, ecchymosis, local bleeding and blisters, severe cases including blood incoagulobility, systemic hemorrhage (including bleeding in the brain), necrosis, compartment syndrome, pressure drop, shock, loss of coagulation factors (disseminated intravascular coagulation), renal failure and multiple organ dysfunction. The genus agkistrodon, found in Latin America from Mexico to northwestern Costa Rica. Agkistrodon bilineatus, is one of the main causes of bites in its geographic reach, the reported symptoms of the bite include severe pain, local bleeding, edema, nasal and gingival bleeding, petechiae, hematuria, shock, renal failure and necrosis.

== Prevention ==
The use of leather shoes, boots and gloves can help to reduce accidents.

== See also ==
- Animal attacks in Latin America
- List of fatal snake bites in the United States
- List of fatal snake bites in Australia
