= PhTx-1 =

Toxic fraction

PhTx-1 is a toxic fraction isolated from the venom of the Brazilian wandering spider Phoneutria nigriventer.

== Composition and Target ==
PhTx-1 has as its main toxin PnTx-1, with a molecular mass of 8,594.6 Da, composed of 77 aminoacid residues, 14 of which are cysteines. PnTx-1, also known as Tx1, exerts an inhibitory effect on neuronal sodium channels (Nav1.2). This component is considered highly pathogenic for primates.
