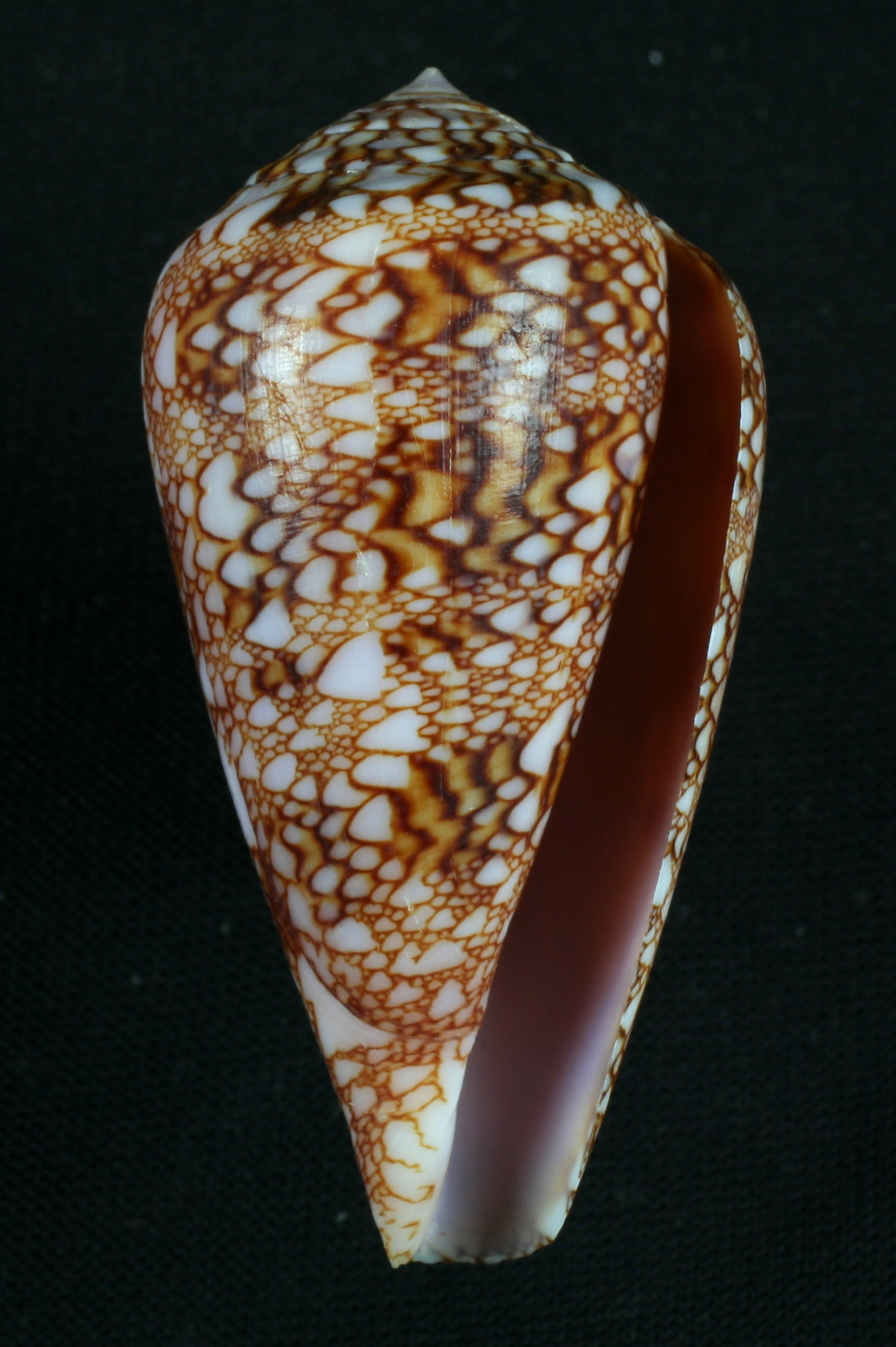
- Apertural view of shell of Conus dalli Stearns, 1873, measuring 53.3 mm in height, collected in the Bay of Chiriqui, Panama.
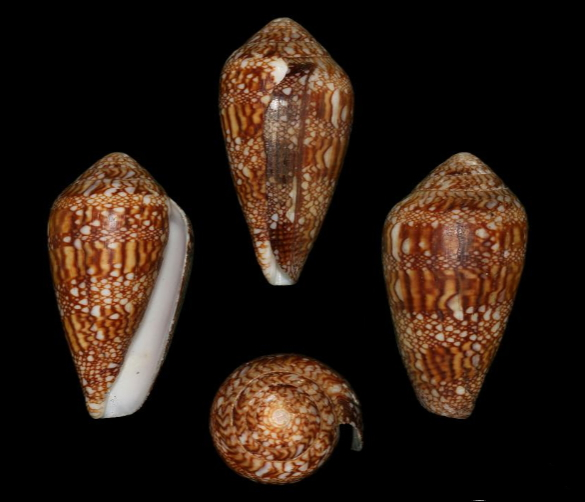

Conservation status
- Least Concern (IUCN 3.1)

Scientific classification
- Kingdom: Animalia
- Phylum: Mollusca
- Class: Gastropoda
- Subclass: Caenogastropoda
- Order: Neogastropoda
- Superfamily: Conoidea
- Family: Conidae
- Genus: Conus
- Species: C. dalli

Binomial name
- Conus dalli Stearns, 1873

Synonyms
- Conus (Cylinder) dalli Stearns, 1873 accepted, alternate representation; Conus gillei Jousseaume, F.P., 1884; Cylinder dalli (Stearns, 1873); Cylindrus gillei Jousseaume, 1884

= Conus dalli =

Species of sea snail

Conus dalli, common name Dall's cone, is a species of sea snail, a marine gastropod mollusk in the family Conidae, the cone snails and their allies.

Like all species within the genus Conus, these snails are predatory and venomous. They are capable of stinging humans, therefore live ones should be handled carefully or not at all.

Not to be confused with † Conus dalli Toula, 1911 which is, according to Fossilworks, a synonym of † Conus imitator Brown and Pilsbry 1911

== Description ==
The size of an adult shell varies between 32 mm and 80 mm.

The spire is indistinctly grooved. The body whorl is obscurely spirally ribbed below. The color of the shell is yellowish brown, with reddish brown longitudinal stripes, interrupted by four revolving bands of white spots, and occasional white spots on the darker surface. The interior of the aperture is rosy pink.

== Distribution ==
This species occurs in the Eastern Pacific off the Galapagos Islands, and the Gulf of California to Panama. Type locality: Islas Marias, Golfo de California.

== Notes ==
- Puillandre N., Duda T.F., Meyer C., Olivera B.M. & Bouchet P. (2015). One, four or 100 genera? A new classification of the cone snails. Journal of Molluscan Studies. 81: 1–23

== Gallery ==
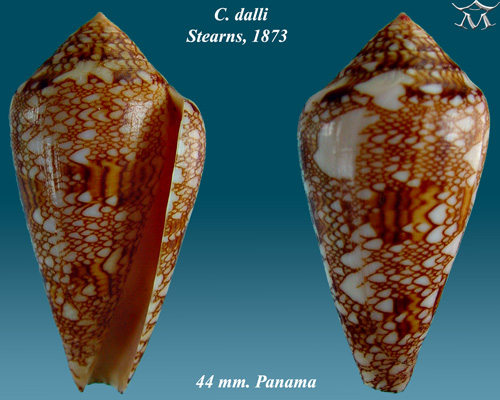
Conus dalli Stearns, 1873

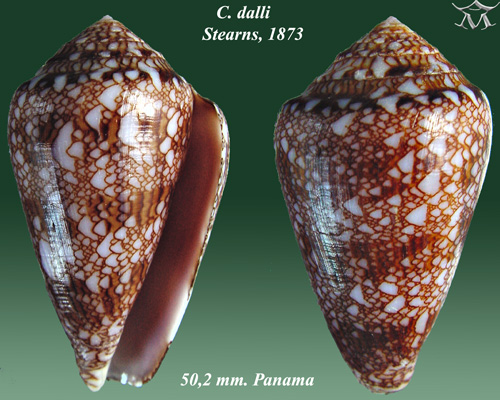
Conus dalli Stearns, 1873

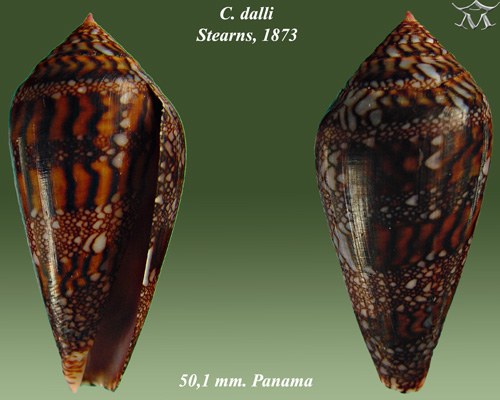
Conus dalli Stearns, 1873
