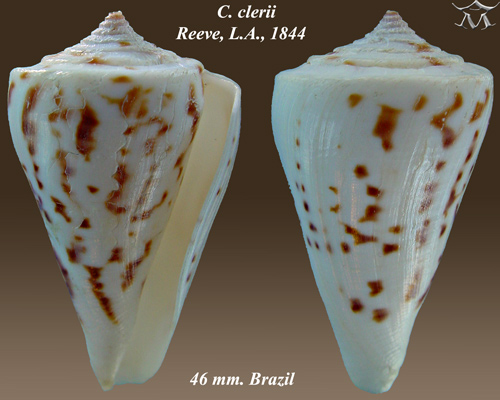
- Apertural and abapertural views of shell of Conus clerii Reeve, L.A., 1844
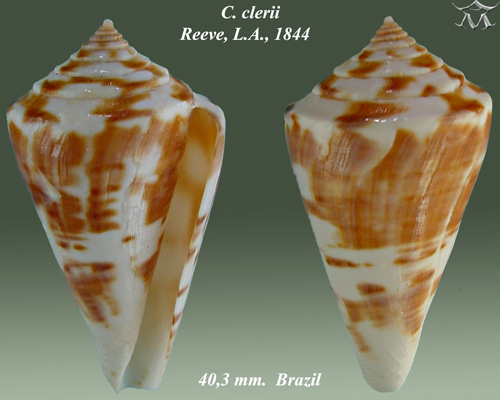

Conservation status
- Least Concern (IUCN 3.1)

Scientific classification
- Kingdom: Animalia
- Phylum: Mollusca
- Class: Gastropoda
- Subclass: Caenogastropoda
- Order: Neogastropoda
- Superfamily: Conoidea
- Family: Conidae
- Genus: Conus
- Species: C. clerii

Binomial name
- Conus clerii Reeve, 1844

Synonyms
- Conus (Lamniconus) clerii Reeve, 1844 · accepted, alternate representation; Lamniconus clerii (Reeve, 1844)

= Conus clerii =

Species of sea snail

Conus clerii, common name Clery's cone, is a species of sea snail, a marine gastropod mollusk in the family Conidae, the cone snails and their allies.

Like all species within the genus Conus, these snails are predatory and venomous. They are capable of stinging humans, therefore live ones should be handled carefully or not at all.

== Distribution ==
This species is found in the Atlantic Ocean, most commonly between Brazil to Northern Argentina, with a type locality in Cape St. Thomas, State of Rio de Janeiro, Brazil.

== Description ==
The maximum recorded shell length is 65 mm.

== Habitat ==
Minimum recorded depth is 15 m. Maximum recorded depth is 100 m.
