= Scorpion sting =

- Other names: scorpion
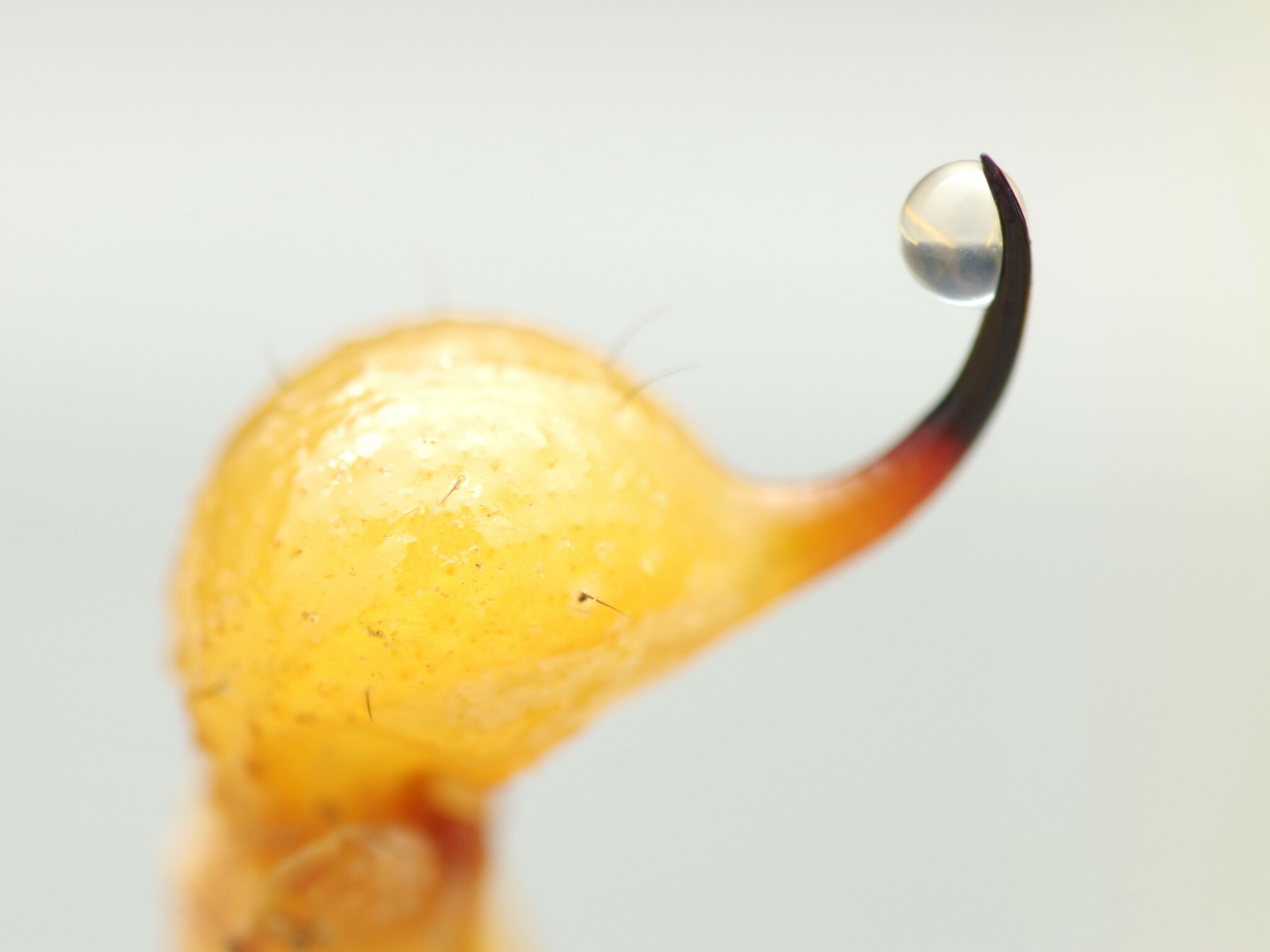
- Scorpion stinger with a droplet of venom
- Specialty: Dermatology, Emergency medicine
- Symptoms: Pain, bleeding, swelling, parathesia
- Complications: Envenomation
- Causes: Scorpions
- Deaths: deaths from a scorpion are unlikely

A scorpion sting is an injury caused by the venomous stinger of a scorpion resulting in the medical condition known as scorpionism, which may vary in severity. The anatomical part of the scorpion that delivers the sting is called a "telson". In typical cases, scorpion stings usually result in pain, paresthesia, and variable swelling. In serious cases, scorpion stings may involve the envenomation of humans by toxic scorpions, which may result in extreme pain, serious illness, or even death depending on the toxicity of the venom.

Most scorpion stings range in severity from minor swelling to medically significant lesions, with only a few able to cause severe allergic, neurotic or necrotic reactions. However, scorpion stings account for approximately 3,000 deaths a year worldwide. The Brazilian yellow scorpion (Tityus serrulatus) is one species known for being especially dangerous, being responsible for most scorpion sting fatalities in South America.

Scorpion stings are seen all over the world but are predominantly seen in the tropical and subtropical areas. In the Western hemisphere, these areas include Mexico, northern South America and southeast Brazil. In the Eastern hemisphere, these regions include Sub-Saharan Africa, the Middle East, and the Indian subcontinent.

== Characteristics and side effects ==
The byproducts of some arthropods may be used as an aphrodisiac. Some of these arthropods whose byproduct may be used as medicines can be found in North America. Across North America, the Arizona bark scorpion (Centruroides sculpturatus) has proven to be the most venomous scorpion. While stings from this species will rarely result in death, side effects can include numbness, tingling, convulsions, difficult breathing, and occasionally, paralysis. These side effects may last up to 72 hours after injection of the venom. It is also observed that penile erection may occur after being stung. The pain of a sting from the Arizona Bark Scorpion has been compared to being struck by a bolt of lightning or electrical current. These symptoms may become visible 4 to 7 minutes after envenomation.

Envenomation of a human by a scorpion may affect the sympathetic or parasympathetic systems depending on the species of scorpion. Some of the more severe side effects include respiratory distress syndrome, pulmonary edema, cardiac dysfunction, impaired hemostasis, pancreatitis, and multiple organ failure. Additionally, treatment of the sting depends on the severity of the incident, which is classified as mild, moderate, or severe. This treatment is composed of three different aspects of the sting: symptomatic measures, vital functions support, and injection antivenom. Not all envenomations result in systemic complications; only a small proportion of stings have this effect on the victim.

== Mechanism ==
The composition of scorpion venom consists of different compounds of varying concentrations. The compounds consist of neurotoxins, cardiotoxin, nephrotoxin, hemolytic toxin, phosphodiesterases, phospholipase, histamine, serotonin, etc. Of these different toxins, the most important and most potent one is the neurotoxin concentration. This compound has neuromuscular and neuroautonomic effects, as well as damages the surrounding local tissue. Neurotoxins work to change voltage-dependent sodium channels, resulting in prolonged neuronal and neuromuscular activity. This prolonged activity of sodium channels results in an erection. There may be nerve damage due to the stabilization of voltage-dependent sodium channels in the open conformation. This position leads to the prolonged and continuous firing of neurons in the somatic, sympathetic, and parasympathetic nervous systems. Continuous firing of neurons causes over excitation and prevents the transmission of normal nerve impulses down the axon.

The venom composition of the deathstalker scorpion contains neurotoxins which are almost completely responsible for this symptom. The poison from this scorpion contain 4 components: chlorotoxin, charybdotoxin, scyllatoxin, and agitoxins. Upon injection with the venom, sacral parasympathetic nerve are stimulated causing a change in the neuronal transmission in vascular and nonvascular smooth muscles. The compound known as the vasoactive intestinal polypeptide (VIP) is the main transmitter. This polypeptide is realized from nerves found long the erectile tissue of the corpus calosum. VIP is the strongest relaxant of penile smooth muscle structure, resulting in an erection upon envenomation. This is the proposed mechanics for all scorpion of the family Buthidae, whose venom composition contains these compounds.

== Epidemiology ==
=== Overview ===
Scorpions are nocturnal animals that typically live in deserts, mountains, caves, and under rocks. It is when they are disturbed that they attack. Scorpions that possess the ability to inject toxic venom with their sting belong to the family Buthidae. The Middle East and North Africa are home to the deadliest scorpions, belonging to the genera Buthus, Leiurus, Androctonus, and Hottentotta. In South America, the deadliest scorpion belongs to genus Tityus. In India and Mexico, the deadliest scorpions involved in scorpionism are Mesobuthus and Centruroides, respectively.

=== Weather, seasons, and climate ===
Scorpions are nocturnal arachnids that have shown a seasonal pattern that is also related to climate. Specifically in Central America, scorpion attacks are mostly seen during the hot months of the year, noting that in Argentina this occurs in the months of October to April. Additionally, a rainy climate may also change the frequency of scorpion incidents. Lower levels of rainfall, specifically precipitation below 30 mm/month, can be associated with fewer scorpion stings, whereas rainfall greater than 30 mm/month shows no relationship to incident rate. This could be due to potentially disruptive effects of rainfall on scorpion habitat.

=== Central America ===
In Central America, most scorpion stings are mildly toxic to humans. However, Panama has reported an incidence of 52 cases per 100,000 people in 2007. Between 1998 and 2006, 28 people have died as result of scorpion stings. In Panama, the taxa of scorpions responsible for these deaths belong to the genus Tityus. This scorpion species is also found in parts of northern South America. Historically, the presence of these scorpions in Panama could be due to the closure of the Panamanian isthmus, thus allowing for the migration of the scorpions from Panama into the northern part of South America. Tityus pachyurus is among the most important scorpionist species. Envenomation by this scorpion is characterized by intense local pain, that usually does not result in tissue injury. Scorpions possess venom glands located at the distal extremity of their abdomen. There are currently 1,400 known species of scorpions and each possesses venom glands. However, of these 1,400 species, only 25 are known to be dangerous enough to humans to potentially cause death upon envenomation. Other countries in Central America are habitat to the scorpion genus Centruroides. Species in this genus are only mildly toxic to humans even though they have ion channel-active toxins in their venom.

== See also ==
- Scorpionism in Central America
