= Butantoxin =

Scorpion toxin

Butantoxin (BuTX) is a compound of the venom of three Brazilian and an Argentinean scorpion species of the genus Tityus. Butantoxin reversibly blocks the voltage-gated K+ channels Shaker B and Kv1.2, and the Ca^{2+}-activated K^{+} channels K_{Ca} 1.1 and K_{Ca} 3.1.

== Sources ==
Butantoxin is one of multiple toxins isolated from the venom of three Brazilian and one Argentinean scorpion species of the genus Tityus: T. serrulatus, Tityus bahiensis, T. stigmurus and Tityus trivitattus. Butantoxin was the first isolated scorpion toxin (identical primary structure and folding) found to be produced by more than one scorpion species. Previously studied toxin sequences varied between different species within a genus.

== Chemistry ==
=== Family ===
The scorpion toxins that are selective for K+ channels (KTx) are classified into families: α-, β- and γ-KTx. These families contain further subfamilies based upon sequence similarities. Butantoxin is the first member of the short-chain scorpion toxin family α-KTx, the best studied family to date. Butantoxin belongs to subfamily α-KT12.

=== Primary structure ===
K^{+} channel toxins are short-chain peptides. They have 31–41 residues and contain 3 or 4 disulfide bonds. Butantoxin consists of 40 amino acids and is stabilized by 4 disulfide bonds (Cys2-Cys5, Cys10-Cys31, Cys16-Cys36 and Cys20-Cys38). The N-terminal C2-C5 disulfide bond is unique to butantoxin; the other 3 are present in all members of the short-chain scorpion toxin family. While this unique disulfide bond is not likely to play a role in the stability of butantoxin, it may affect receptor specificity.

=== Secondary structure ===
The K^{+} channel toxins from scorpions have a conserved three-dimensional (3D) scaffold. Two disulfide bonds connect an α-helix to one of the strands in a β-sheet ('α-β disulfide bridge motif’). Two antiparallel strands (Gly29-Met32 and Lys35-Cys38) compose the β-sheet. A type-I α-turn (Asn33-Asn34) connects the strands. A quasi-third strand of the β-sheet consists of residues Cys5-Ala9. A third disulfide bond connects the β-sheet to an extended section in the N-terminal of the toxin.

=== Homology ===
Butantoxin is present in the venom of several scorpion species. It belongs to the α-KTx12 toxin subfamily and has a high structural similarity with other toxins from this subfamily. The highly conserved primary sequence and folding of butantoxin suggests these contribute to essential aspects of the toxins effectiveness. Butantoxin has the systematic names α-KTx12.1 (originally named TsTX-IV, from the Brazilian scorpion T. serrulatus), α-KTx12.2 (originally named TtBut-toxin from the Argentinean scorpion T. trivittatus) and α-KTx12.4 (originally named TstBut, from the Brazilian scorpion T. stigmurus). The scorpion T. costatus toxin α-KTx12.3 (butantoxin-like peptide or Tco30) has glutamic acid in position 9, whereas butantoxin has alanine at that position.

== Target ==
Butantoxin reversibly blocks the voltage-gated K+ channels, Shaker B and Kv1.2, and the Ca2+-activated K+ channels, Kca1.1 and Kca3.1. Thus, butantoxin has the capacity to interact with a variety of K+ channels and has a variable affinity for each K+ channel. This suggests butantoxin has some conformational flexibility despite its 4 disulfide bonds. This flexibility would then allow its structure to fit into the pore region of this diverse range of K+ channels. The other α-KTx-12 subfamily toxins block the same K+ channels. Due to variability in the primary sequence, all subfamily members have a different affinity for the various K+ channels. Butantoxin has also been shown to inhibit both T-cell proliferation and the interleukin-2 production by antigen-stimulated T-helper cells.

== Mode of action ==
Butantoxin blocks the K+ channels reversibly, following Michaelis–Menten saturation kinetics. The toxin binds to the external vestibule of the pore, occluding it. This reaction is governed by electrostatic interactions between negatively charged residues in the K^{+} channel and positively charged residues in the toxin. Based on the results obtained from docking simulations, butantoxin may require only 6 main molecular contacts to interact with the Kv1.2 channel. This low number may explain the weak activity of Butantoxin regarding the Kv1.2 channel. For the affinity of the interaction between butantoxin and the Kv1.2 channel the N-terminal domain is important, because the affinity for the channel depends on its additional molecular contacts. On the contrary, the N-terminal domain of butantoxin does not contribute to the toxin activity on Kca3.1.

== Toxicity ==
The blockage of K^{+} channels gives the scorpion venom its neurotoxic activity. Butantoxin weakly blocks Shaker B, Kv1.2 and Kca3.1 channels. It is about 60 times less potent than the more well known maurotoxin (MTX), another member of the short-chain scorpion toxin family. In mice, the median lethal dose (LD_{50}) by intravenous injection of butantoxin-TsTX-IV is 826 ug/kg.
