= Tityustoxin =

Toxin found in the venom of scorpions from the subfamily of Tityinae

Tityustoxin is a toxin found in the venom of scorpions from the subfamily Tityinae. By binding to voltage-dependent sodium ion channels and potassium channels, they cause sialorrhea, lacrimation and rhinorrhea.

== Sources ==
Scorpions are distributed among six families. Only those of the family Buthidae are dangerous to humans. Within this family, the subfamily Tityinae cause the most scorpion poisoning in humans. These species are found in Brazil (Tityus serrulatus, T. bahiensis and T. stigmurus) and in Northern and Southern Venezuela (T. discrepans). The venom of Tityus serrulatus is the most potent of these.

== Chemistry ==
The crude venom of T. serrulatus contains different toxins. Some of the strongest derivates are the neurotoxins tityustoxin and toxin Ts-g. Two types of toxins are considered to be responsible for the main toxic effect: toxin gamma (a β-type toxin) and tityustoxin (TsTX, an α-type toxin), both with a specific affinity to the sodium channel. Other types of venom are: TsTX-kα, a 37 amino acid, toxin gamma (TsTX-γ and TsTX-I) with 61 amino acid residues is the major neurotoxin of this venom. TsTX-Kβ has a longer chain. K+ channels blocking peptides are single chain polypeptides of 30-40 amino acids with three disulphide bridges. The toxin with four disulphide bonds is from TsTX-IV. This contains 41 amino acid residues.

== Targets ==
- Na^{+} Channel affecting peptides: TsTX-γ and TsTX-I.
- Ca^{2+} activated K^{+} Channel affecting peptides: TsTX-Kβ and TsTX-IV (the latter has high affinity). TsTx-IV blocks Ca^{2+} activated K^{+} channels of high conductance.

== Mode of action ==
Two types of toxin are interesting: α-Scorpion toxins bind at site 3 of Na1 channels, causing a slowing of their inactivation. β-Scorpion toxins bind at site 4, shifting the activation of Na1 currents (INa) toward more negative potentials. Tityustoxin causes cell depolarization, activating Na^{+} channels and increasing the Na^{+} uptake that can affect Ca^{2+} uptake and can increase acetylcholine (ACh) release from cerebral cortical slices.

=== Na^{+} channels ===
The α-toxins bind to the subunit 3 of the sodium channel, slowing the inactivation and increasing peak current without changing time to peak. This causes cell depolarization that opens calcium channels allowing the influx of Ca^{2+}, triggering ACh release. Both the steady-state activation and inactivation curves are shifted to more negative potentials.

=== K^{+} channels ===
TsTX-I, Ts1 or toxin gamma is a β-type toxin that binds to receptor site 4 and shift the voltage dependence of the sodium channel activation to more negative potentials. TsTX-Ka selectively blocks voltage-gated noninactivating (possibly delayed rectifier) K^{+} channels in synaptosomes.

== Toxicity ==
The venom of Tityus serrulatus is the most potent of the toxins from the species. Tityustoxin-1, TsTX-I is the most toxic protein among the neurotoxins in this venom, with an intravenous and intracisternal LD_{50} (mouse) of 76 ± 9 and 1.1 ± 0.3 μg/kg, respectively. The identification of TsTX-I as a potent component of T. serrulatus venom characterized it as the major and main neurotoxin from this venom. Poisoning effects in man evoked by T. serrulatus venom are sialorrhea, lacrimation and rhinorrhea and acute pancreatitis. Catecholamines by the adrenal glands and postganglionic nerve terminals and Ach by ganglions and postganglionic nerve terminals are released when the poison strikes. Also other neurotransmitters are released by the whole venom and isolated toxins. In rats, the Tityustoxin caused dramatic effects on the circulatory and respiratory systems, consisting of hypotension, tachypnea, hyperpnea, ataxic and gasping breathing. Following these initial effects, 5 or 10 μg of TsTX induced hypertension and hyperpnea. The largest dose produced apnea and death about 70 min later.

== Treatment ==
The lung edema induced by TsTX is blocked by phenobarbital. Rabbit anti-TsNTxP antibodies displayed cross-reactivity with the scorpion toxins and showed in vitro neutralizing capacity. Thus, this protein emerges as a strong candidate for the production of antiserum to be used in the treatment of scorpion stings. The nontoxic recombinant protein can induce a level of circulating antibodies sufficient to neutralize the toxic effects of Tityus toxins and is a good candidate for use in the production of a new generation of neutralizing polyclonal antibodies for clinical use.
