= Tf2 toxin =

Scorpion toxin

- Structure as predicted by AlphaFold

Properties
Chemical formula	C_{309}H_{438}N_{80}O_{87}S_{9}
Molar mass	6953.92 g·mol^{−1}

Related compounds
Related compounds	Tb2-II
- Except where otherwise noted, data are given for materials in their standard state (at 25 °C [77 °F], 100 kPa). Infobox references

The scorpion toxin Tf2 is a relatively large toxin and the first identified β-scorpion toxin extracted from the venom of the Brazilian scorpion Tityus fasciolatus. It is a neurotoxin that shifts the activation of voltage-gated sodium Na_{V}1.3 channel isoforms to more negative values allowing opening near the resting membrane potential. Tf2 specificity is not strictly limited to Na_{V}1.3 channels, it also acts on Na_{V}1.9 sodium channels.

== Etymology and Source ==
Tf2 gets its name from the Brazilian scorpion Tityus fasciolatus which is the origin species. The Tityus fasciolatus is a scorpion found in Brazil in the Cerrado biome; it is phylogenetically related to Tityus serrulatus.

Tf2 toxin comes from the venom of the endemic species Tityus fasciolatus, which is a scorpion from the family of Buthidae.

== Chemistry ==
=== Structure ===
The nucleotide sequence that codes for Tf2 consists of 255 nucleotides. Tf2 is a relatively large toxin, which is stabilized by disulfide crosslinks. It is composed of 64 amino acid residues: MKRFLLFISILMMIGTIVVGKEGYAMDHEGCKFSCFIRPSGFCDGYCKTHLKASSGYCAWPACYCYGVPSNIKVWDYATNKCGK. The structural characteristics of the β-scorpion toxins allow it to affect sodium channels. Like some other toxins originating from the Tityus genus, Tf2 contains a cluster of aromatic residues formed by Y4, Y37, Y44, Y46, W40 and W55, and these determine its function on the nervous system.

Tf2 possesses a positive electrostatic potential at position 1 (K1), a negative electrostatic potential at position 2 (E2), and a positively charged group at position 12 (K12).. The positive charges at position 1 and 12 and the negative charge at position 2 determine the function of the toxin on voltage gated sodium channels. In a three-dimensional model, the negative residue is central and surrounded by an aromatic core creating a specific binding interface.

=== Homology and Family ===
The Tf2 sequence and respective positions of electrostatic charges are very typical for the Tityus genus of scorpion toxins. As a toxin, Tf2 is identical to the toxin Tb2-II which is found in Tityus bahiensis. Tf2 is similar in sequence to several other toxins from the genus; the sequence homology classifies it as a β-scorpion toxin.

== Target ==
Tf2 is a mammal-selective peptide toxin that modulates voltage-gated sodium channels (Na_{V}). As it primarily targets the mammalian Na_{V}1.3 and Na_{V}1.9 isoforms and has no measurable effect on seven other Na_{V} isoforms (Na_{V}1.1-1.2; Na_{V}1.4-1.8).

== Mode of Action ==
As a β-scorpion toxin, Tf2 interacts with the voltage sensors of Na_{V} channels. During its action, Tf2 induces a hyperpolarizing shift in the voltage-dependence of activation, changing the half-activation voltage (V_{50}) to more negative values. For the Na_{V}1.3 subtype, 1μM of Tf2 shifts the V_{50} from control values of approximately –29.5 mV to –33.1 mV down to –40.8 mV to –49.3 mV. A similar effect is observed on the Na_{V}1.9 subtype, where V_{50} is shifted from approximately –55.1 mV to -61.4 mV. As a result, the channels open at membrane potentials closer to the resting membrane potential, which causes early channel opening.

Tf2 also causes a significant decrease in the peak current and an increase in slope factor for the Na_{V}1.3 activation curve (from approximately 3.5 mV to about 8.0-8.9 mV). This indicates that Tf2 reduces the channel's maximum open probability, meaning that even at highly depolarized potentials, the toxin-bound channels do not open as effectively as unbound channels, thus reducing the total peak sodium current.

== Toxicity ==
Tf2-specific toxic effects remain unknown in humans, but was presented in mouse model: Mice injected with 1μM of Tf2 display spontaneous pain behaviour (e.g., licking, flinching), erythema and swelling. These responses to a Tf2 injection are present even when Na_{V}1.3 and Na_{V}1.9 activity have been inhibited.
