= Tityus stigmurus toxin 1 =

Scorpion neurotoxin

Tityus stigmurus toxin 1 (Tst1) is a neurotoxin found in the venom of the Brazilian scorpion, Tityus stigmurus. It acts on voltage-gated sodium channels (Navs), altering opening and inactivation voltages, recovery from inactivation, and overall current flow.

Superfamily	Scorpion toxin
Family	NaScTx (Sodium channel toxins)
Subfamily	β-toxin
Mature protein amino acid sequence	GKEGYLMDHEGCKLSCFIRPSGYCGRECTLKKGSSGYCAWPACYCYGLPNWVKVWDRATNKC

== Etymology and source ==
Tst1 (alternatively PT-Mice-beta* NaTx6.3, Tst-gamma, toxin gamma-like of Tityus stigmurus) is a neurotoxic peptide which can be purified from the venom of the Brazilian scorpion, Tityus stigmurus.

The toxin name is derived from the name of the scorpion, with ‘Tst’ standing for Tityus stigmurus toxin. The ‘1’ was initially used by Becerril et al. to indicate that the toxin is 𝛾-like, however, Tst1 has since been found to be a β-toxin.

== Chemistry ==
Tst1 consists of 61 amino acid residues, with an average molecular mass of 6981.8 Da. Tst1 has 96.7% identity with Ts1 and 93.4% with Tt1g, which are from Tityus serrulatus and Tityus trivittatus scorpions, respectively and both of which are also β-toxins.

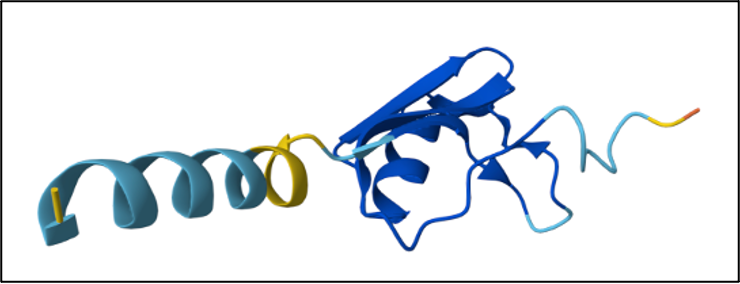
3D Structure of Tst1, predicted by Alphafold

Tst1 is part of the NaScTx family, which are neurotoxins that specifically target Nav channels. The 3D structure of the toxin has not yet been solved, however it can be predicted using Alphafold. The prediction suggests that the peptide is a cysteine-stabilised alpha/beta fold protein consisting of two α - helices and three β-sheets, with the last cysteine in the amino acid sequence being a cysteine amide.

== Target and mode of action ==
Tst1 is a β-toxin, meaning that it interacts with the voltage sensing domains of Navs. Tst1 affects the activation voltage, inactivation voltage and recovery, and the overall current flow through the channels, with the largest effects being observed in Nav 1.3. Tst1 shifts the activation voltage of the channel towards more hyperpolarized potentials, with a shift of approximately -35 mV in Nav 1.3. It also shifts the steady-state inactivation potential by approximately -21 mV and delays recovery from inactivation by 10.69 ms. Finally, Tst1 reduces the current flow through these channels by 85.23%, in a dosage-dependent manner, with an IC50 of 8.79 nM. While Nav 1.3 is the most sensitive to Tst1, it is not the only isoform affected. Nav 1.2 and 1.4 were also significantly affected in all the parameters mentioned above, demonstrating that Tst1 activity is not specific to one isoform.

== Toxicity ==
T. stigmurus is one of the most medically relevant species in its genus, particularly in the northeast region of Brazil. Symptoms of a T. stigmurus sting are variable, including localised pain, edema, erythema, paresthesia, headache, vomiting, and, in more severe cases, cardiac arrhythmias and shock. The effects of isolated Tst1 have not been determined, however, sodium channel toxins are the peptides mainly responsible for the neurotoxic symptoms of human envenomation, and so it is expected that Tst1 contributes to the neurotoxic symptoms in these cases.
