= Ts8 =

Neurotoxin

Ts8 (also known as: TsK2, Tityustoxin K-beta, TsTX-K beta or TsTx-Kβ) is a neurotoxin present in the venom of the Brazilian yellow scorpion, Tityus serrulatus. Ts8 is a selective inhibitor of the voltage-gated potassium channel Kv4.2

== Etymology and Source ==
The neurotoxin Ts8 can be derived from the venom from the Brazilian yellow scorpion, Tityus serrulatus (Ts). This scorpion is predominantly found in Brazil. Alternative names for the Ts8 toxin are TsK2, Tityustoxin K-beta, TsTX-K beta and TsTx-Kβ.

== Chemistry ==
Ts8 belongs to the β-KTx family 1. Toxins in this family contain about 59-75 amino acid residues and three disulfide bridges. There are two-domain peptides; the N-terminal helical domain (NHD) and the C-terminal CSαβ domain (CCD). The CCD is responsible for the neurotoxic activity.

Ts8 contains 60 amino acid residues and the three disulfide bridges that were already mentioned. It has a molecular weight of 6716 Da. Its amino acid sequence is as follows:

K-L-V-A-L-I-P-N-D-Q-L-R-S-I-L-K-A-V-V-H-K-V-A-K-T-Q-F-G-C-P-A-Y-E-G-Y-C-N-D-H-C-N-D-I-E-R-K-D-G-E-C-H-G-F-K-C-K-C-A-K-D

Physical and chemical characteristics of Ts8
Molecular weight	Amino acids
6716 Da	60

== Target ==
Ts8 selectively and reversibly inhibits the voltage-gated potassium channel Kv4.2. Maximal block of the peak current is 65%. Kv4.2 channels are found in a variety of tissues, including high levels in the brain and heart.

Purified recombinant Ts8 was present in three forms, of which Ts8-FragII has a small inhibitory effect on the Kv1.3 channel.

== Mode of action ==
The inhibition caused by the neurotoxin Ts8 on Kv4.2 channels increases with repeated activation of the channel in the presence of the toxin. In addition the channels inactivated more rapidly, suggesting that the toxin has a preference to bind to the inactivated state of the Kv4.2 channels.

Ts8 does not have pore-forming activity.

== Toxicity ==
In mice, Ts8 increases earlier nociception with higher doses. Elimination or inhibition of Kv4.2 channels via intraplantar injections was seen to induce hypersensitivity to mechanical stimuli. Via intrathecal injection this effect was prolonged and a prolongation plateau of mechanical hypersensitivity was observed. Thus Ts8 can enhance sensitivity to tactile- and mechanical stimuli in mice, by inhibition of the Kv4.2 channels. The symptoms caused by Ts8 induce hyperalgesia, intense and persistent pain.

Ts8 is toxic to human erythrocytes type A+ in concentrations above 2.89 μM.

== Treatment ==
A sting by Tityus serrulatus is treated with a scorpion antivenom serum. This serum, Soro antiscorpionico, containing a human antibody fragment, neutralizes most of the entire venomous cocktail of neurotoxins.

== Therapeutic use ==
In a study from Cordeiro et al (2022) they expressed recombinant Ts8 (rTs8) in Pichia pastoris yeast to be able to evaluate the peptide expression under different conditioning. They looked at the native Ts8 and recombinant Ts8, rTs8-FragI and rTs8-FragII. These forms were all evaluated by an antimicrobial assay. This resulted in growth inhibition of P. pastoris. The native form of the toxin had a larger inhibitory effect than the recombinant forms.

The study from Oliveira et al (2022) showed the antimicrobial activity of Ts8. Here they tested the native Ts8 against different types of microorganisms;

- Gram-positive bacteria: Micrococcus luteus
- Gram-negative bacteria: Escherichia coli
- Yeast: Candida albicans
- Filamentous fungus: Aspergillus niger

Ts8 had antimicrobial activity for all of these microorganisms. Ts8 has the strongest effect on gram-negative bacteria, and the lowest effect on both the yeast and the filamentous fungus. This testing was an initial screening to be able to expand the spectrum of action of this toxin. As mentioned before, Ts8 can be toxic for human erythrocytes. The concentration of the antimicrobial assay on Escherichia coli is lower than what is toxic for the human erythrocytes, 1.45 μM. Thus it can be concluded that Ts8 potentially can be used as an antibiotic against E. coli.

== See also ==
- Tityustoxin
- TsIV
