= Tb1 (toxin) =

Scorpion neurotoxin

Tb-gamma

Identifiers
- Organism: Tityus bahiensis
- Symbol: Tb1
- Orthologs: OMA: entry
- UniProt: P5661
Search for
- Structures: Swiss-model
- Domains: InterPro

Tb1 (or Tb-gamma) is a neurotoxin that is naturally found in the venom of the Brazilian scorpion Tityus bahiensis. Presumably by acting on voltage-gated sodium channels, it triggers excessive glutamate release, which can lead to both behavioral and electrographic epileptiform alterations, as well as neuronal injury.

== Etymology ==
'Tb' is an acronym for the scorpion Tityus bahiensis in whose venom the toxin is found. For all Tityus toxins, the number '1' refers to the fact that the toxin is gamma-like. Tb1 is also known as Tb-gamma or gamma-bahiensis. The use of 'gamma' in this terminology refers to the fact that Tb1 is more than 95% identical to the Tityus serrulatus gamma toxin.

== Sources ==
Tb1 is naturally found in the venom of the Brazilian scorpion T. bahiensis, known as the brown scorpion. This scorpion is found in South America and is medically important in Brazil. Tb1 is the most prevalent toxin found in the venom of T. bahiensis, accounting for 10% of the entire soluble venom content.

== Chemistry ==
=== Structure ===
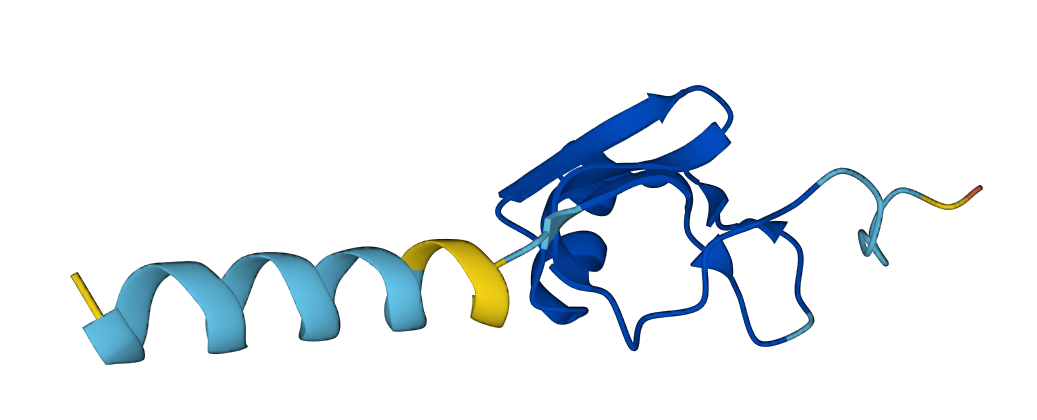
Predicted 3D structure of the Tb1 protein

Animation of the predicted 3D structure of Tb1

The Tb1 peptide in mature form contains 61 amino acids (21K-81C), where the cysteine at the C-terminus is a modified residue. The mature form has a molecular mass of 6868.03 Da. The unprocessed amino acid sequence of the Tb1 peptide is:

1	MKGMILFISC 	LLLIGIVVEC	20  
21 	KEGYLMDHEG	CKLSCFIRPS	40 
41 	GYCGSECKIK	KGSSGYCAWP	60  
61 	ACYCYGLPNW	VKVWDRATNK 	80  
81	CGKK			    	84

The unprocessed form of the peptide has a signal peptide of 20 amino acids at the N-terminus. Furthermore, this unprocessed sequence of Tb1 has a three-amino acid tail following the modified residue at the C-terminus. Thus, this unprocessed sequence contains 84 amino acids and has a molecular mass of 9,384 Da. Like most sodium-channel scorpion toxins, the Tb1 peptide has four disulfide bonds. For Tb1, these are located between amino acids 31 and 81, 35 and 57, 43 and 62, and 47 and 64. The domain of the Tb1 protein is characterized by an alpha-helix connected to antiparallel beta-sheets by these disulfide bonds.

=== Homology ===
Tb1 is homologous to the gamma toxin from the T. serrulatus venom. This gamma toxin is also known as Ts1, TsTX-I, TsVII, or toxin γ. Tb1 and the gamma toxin from the T. serrulatus venom are 96.72% identical, except for two amino acids.

=== Family ===
Tb1 is a sodium channel scorpion toxin (NaScTx) and belongs to the beta toxin subfamily. Within the NaScTx family, Tb1 is part of the NaTx6 cluster. This cluster consists of four toxins found in the venom of scorpions that inhabit the Southern area of the Amazonian rainforest: Tco-gamma, Tst1, Tb1 and the previously mentioned Ts1.

== Target ==
Tb1 is a beta-type scorpion toxin. Beta toxins bind voltage-independently at site 4 of the voltage-gated sodium channels in neurons. Considering family and homology, it is likely that Tb1 has the same target.

== Mode of action ==
By binding at site 4 of voltage-dependent sodium channels, beta-type scorpion toxins shift the activation voltage toward more negative potentials. Beta-type scorpion toxins also reduce the amplitude of the sodium current. Since Tb1 is also a beta-type scorpion toxin, it is likely that Tb1 has the same working mechanism.

== Toxicity ==
Intrahippocampal injection of Tb1 in rats causes an excessive release of glutamate, leading to increased glutamate levels. Toxins derived from T. bahiensis can induce seizures in rats and cause damage to hippocampal areas when administered intracerebrally. This injection causes significant respiratory difficulty, myoclonus, wet dog shakes (WDS) and spikes and discharges on EEG. A different study found that, when injected intraperitoneally, 50 μg of purified Tb1 peptide is lethal to mice.

== Therapeutic use ==
Tb1 could serve as a valuable tool for researching the role of sodium channels in seizures, contributing to our comprehension of how these channels participate in the clinical manifestations resulting from abnormal cell excitability. Given the importance of identifying new active compounds to advance the understanding and treatment of channelopathies, this toxin could be an asset for such investigations.
