= List of scorpions of Trinidad and Tobago =

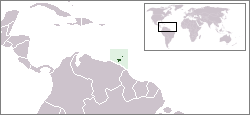
Location of Trinidad and Tobago in the Caribbean

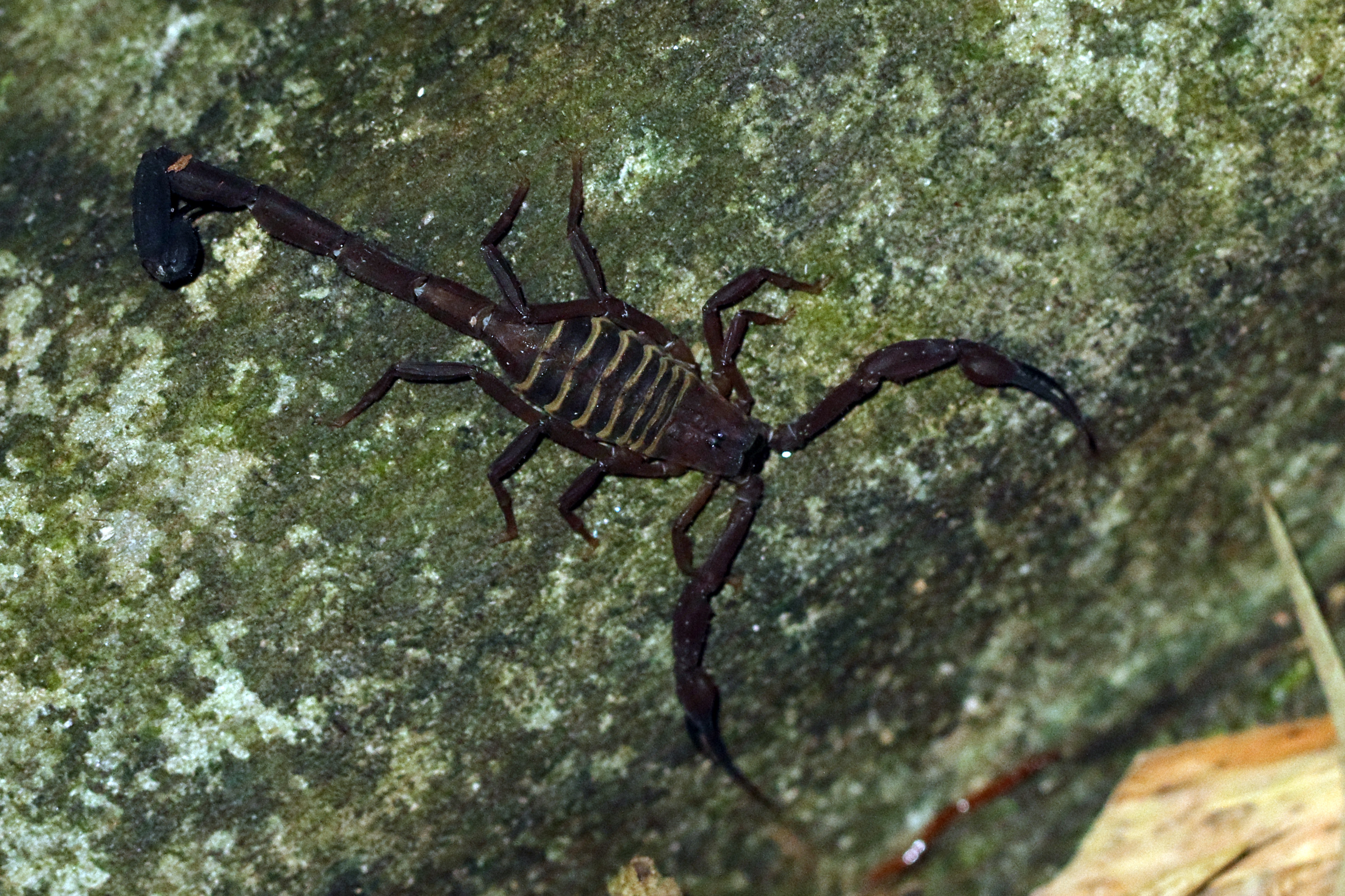
Tityus trinitatis Trinidad

This is a list of the scorpions of Trinidad and Tobago. The first synopsis of the scorpion fauna came from E. N. Kjellesvig-Waering in 1966 with a total of 8 species. Work by Oscar Franke and Julius Boos, Wilson R. Lourenço & D. Huber and Lorenzo Prendini brought the total to ten species with eight on Trinidad and six on Tobago. Of the ten species seven are endemic to the islands.

== Buthidae ==
- Ananteris cussinii Borelli, 1910 – Trinidad and Tobago and northern South America
- Microtityus rickyi Kjellesvig-Waering, 1966 – endemic to Trinidad and Tobago
- Microtityus starri Lourenço & Huber, 1999 – endemic to Tobago
- Tityus clathratus C. L. Koch, 1844 – Trinidad and northern South America
- Tityus tenuicauda Prendini, 2001 – endemic to Trinidad
- Tityus melanostictus Pocock, 1893 – Trinidad and northern South America
- Tityus trinitatis Pocock, 1897 – endemic to Trinidad and Tobago

== Chactidae ==
- Broteochactas laui Kjellesvig-Waering, 1966 – endemic to Tobago
- Broteochactas nitidus Pocock, 1893 – endemic to Trinidad and Tobago
- Chactas raymondhansorum Francke & Boos, 1986 – endemic to Trinidad and Tobago

== See also ==
- Natural history of Trinidad and Tobago
