= Tityus asthenes =

Scientific classification
- Kingdom: Animalia
- Phylum: Arthropoda
- Subphylum: Chelicerata
- Class: Arachnida
- Order: Scorpiones
- Family: Buthidae
- Genus: Tityus
- Species: T. asthenes

Binomial name
- Tityus asthenes Pocock, 1893

Species of arachnid

Tityus asthenes is a significantly venomous scorpion endemic to South America. Sometimes it is known as Peruvian black scorpion.

== Description ==
Tityus asthenes is dark brown to black in color, especially on the tarsi and metasomal segments; the pedipalpal fingertips and the mesosomal tergites are somewhat lighter in color. Younger specimens have more yellowish and variegated pigmentation. The pedipalpal fingers have 17 rows of granules, and both sexes have 18 to 22 pectinal teeth. Adults are from 60–75 millimetres (2.4–3.0 in) in length.

This species exhibits sexual dysmorphism (although less marked than in T. obscurus); adult males are longer and thinner than females. The female basal lamellae are dilated, relative to those of male specimens. Juveniles can be sexed by checking the exuviae for dilated basal middle lamellae, indicating the females.

Males usually mature at instar 6, although this can also occur at instar 5. Females also mature at instar 6.

== Behavior ==
This species does not dig burrows, they hide during the day, their habits are mainly nocturnal, they do not actively feed, they usually attack by ambush, waiting for their prey to pass by to attack. These scorpions are relatively non-aggressive towards humans, when they feel threatened they can flee or react very quickly, juveniles are more nervous than adults.

== Range and habitat ==
Tityus asthenes is a Latin American species which can be found in Peru.

== Medical significance ==
Tityus asthenes is a venomous species and should not be disturbed, the LD_{50} value for its venom is 4.14 mg / kg. Its venom is mainly composed of excitatory neurotoxins. The main symptoms can include edema, local pain and paresthesia, the systemic symptoms are characterized by vomiting, profuse sweating, drooling, breathing problems, tachycardia and abdominal pain.
