= TB-1 =

TB1 or TB-1 may refer to:

- Tupolev TB-1, soviet bomber aircraft
- Tb1, a Bosnian commercial television channel
- Tengden TB-001, an unmanned aerial vehicle
- Tb1 (toxin), a neurotoxin
