= Tityus pintodarochai =

Scientific classification
- Kingdom: Animalia
- Phylum: Arthropoda
- Subphylum: Chelicerata
- Class: Arachnida
- Order: Scorpiones
- Family: Buthidae
- Genus: Tityus
- Species: T. pintodarochai

Binomial name
- Tityus pintodarochai Lourenço, 2005

Species of scorpion

Tityus pintodarochai is a species of scorpion belonging to the family Buthidae. It is only known from a single female collected in Paraná state, Brazil.

This is a medium-sized scorpion with a total length of around 50 mm. It is generally yellowish in colour, turning reddish towards the end of the tail. It can be distinguished from the widespread Tityus serrulatus by its lack of dark spots on the abdomen.
