= Bactridines =

Bactridines are a group of six antibacterial peptides from the venom of the Tityus discrepans scorpion. They exclusively target sodium channels. Bactridines are unique in that this scorpion toxin acts on sodium channels of both bacteria and eukaryotes.

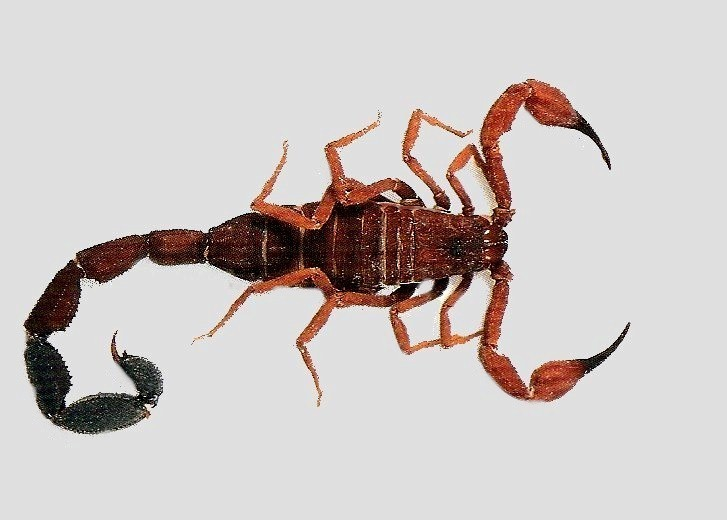
T. Discrepans

== Etymology ==
The name bactridine is derived from the fact that these toxins not only help scorpions to kill their preys but also protect their bodies from harmful pathogens by inhibiting bacteria growth. In captivity, scorpions spray the toxin over their own bodies which suggest that they use the toxin for protection or cleansing.

== Sources ==
Bactridines are found in T. discrepans, a scorpion species within the family Buthidae. T. discrepans is generally found in the Amazon.

== Chemistry ==
Bactridines are part of the long (4 C-C) scorpion toxin superfamily. Bactridine 1-2 also fall under the sodium channel inhibitory- and β subfamily. The bactridines have many similarities and also some differences. Bactridines 1-6 have a molecular mass of 6916, 7362, 7226, 7011, 7101 and 7173 Da respectively (obtained using MALDI-TOF mass spectrometry). They all have the conserved four sulfide bridges, which highly contribute to the secondary structure typical for scorpion β toxins. Bactridines 1 and 2 consist of 61 and 64 amino acids respectively and are found to be positively charged. Bactridines 3-6 have not been fully recorded yet.

== Target ==
Bactridines act specifically on sodium channels. Different subtypes of bactridines have affinity with different voltage-gated sodium channel (Na_{v}) isoforms. Bactridine 2 acts on skeletal Na_{v}1.4 and neuronal Na_{v}1.6 and is most effective on Na_{v}1.4. Bactridine 3 and 4 act on skeletal Na_{v}1.4 and neuronal Na_{v}1.3 and Na_{v}1.6 and are most effective on Na_{v}1.4 and Na_{v}1.3 respectively. Bactridine 5 acts specifically on Na_{v}1.7. Finally, bactridine 6 acts on Na_{v}1.3, Na_{v}1.7 and DmNa_{v}1. The specific sodium channel isoforms on which bactridine 1 acts are not yet known.

== Mode of action ==
Bactridines act on sodium channels in different ways. As a defense mechanism, bactridines protect scorpions from pathogens, they are antibacterial. When T. discrepans venom is applied onto bacteria in solution, it causes bacterial growth inhibition. In bacteria, bactridines cause an outward sodium leak by increasing the sodium channel permeability. In contrast, as an attack mechanism, bactridines are toxic to certain preys by decreasing the permeability of neuronal or skeletal sodium channels.

=== Specific activities ===
The effect of bactridines on voltage-gated sodium channels has been observed under voltage clamp conditions. Bactridine 1 reduces voltage-dependent sodium conductance at potentials > -20 mV. Bactridine 2 causes a hyperpolarizing shift in activation and inactivation and therefore a decrease in the conductance of the channels. Bactridine 3 reduces sodium current. Bactridine 4 reduces sodium conductance (voltage-dependent at potentials > -20 mV). Bactridine 5 induces a hyperpolarizing shift of inactivation. Bactridine 6 also shifts sodium conductance inactivation to the more hyperpolarizing potentials. Unlike bactridine 5, bactridine 6 blocks sodium conductance. Bactridine 6 differs from the other bactridines by initially producing an increase in sodium current.

In addition, bactridines may target other channels.

== Toxicity ==
The venom from T. discrepans is known to cause numerous physiological symptoms including respiratory distress (pulmonary oedema) in humans. It is found that bactridines 2, 4 and 6 show haemolysis of human cells within 10 minutes (≤1%). On the other hand, 1, 3 and 5 don't. The haemolytic effect is bactridine-concentration dependent.

Studies show that bactridine 1 kills insects such as crickets and cockroaches (20 μg/animal) within 48 hours. When injected with a high dosage, bactridine 1 kills 43% of injected crabs (1.8 μg/g). Surprisingly, bactridine 1 is not toxic to mice. In contrast, bactridines 2, 3, 4 and 6 do cause death in mice (3 μg/g) but have no effect on crabs.

== Treatment ==
A T. Discrepans anti-venom is available and it is obtained polyclonally.

== Therapeutic use ==
Bactridines are toxins but they also inhibit the growth of bacteria. The fact that bactridine 1 is not toxic to mice and has no haemolytic effect on human erythrocytes seems to present some opportunities for therapeutic use in the form of antibiotics.
