= TF2 (disambiguation) =

TF2 usually refers to Team Fortress 2, a 2007 video game developed by Valve.

TF2 or TF.2 may also refer to:

== Aircraft ==
- Sopwith TF.2 Salamander, a British World War I aircraft
- Westland Wyvern TF.2,

== Search and rescue ==
- CA-TF2
- FL-TF2
- VA-TF2

== Entertainment ==
- France 2, a French television network owned by France Télévisions
- Transformers: Revenge of the Fallen, a 2009 film
- Titanfall 2, a 2016 video game developed by Respawn Entertainment
- Transport Fever 2, a 2019 video game developed by Urban Games

== Biology ==
- Tf2, a toxin

== See also ==
- (162015) 1994 TF_{2}, a minor planet
