= Scorpionism in Central America =

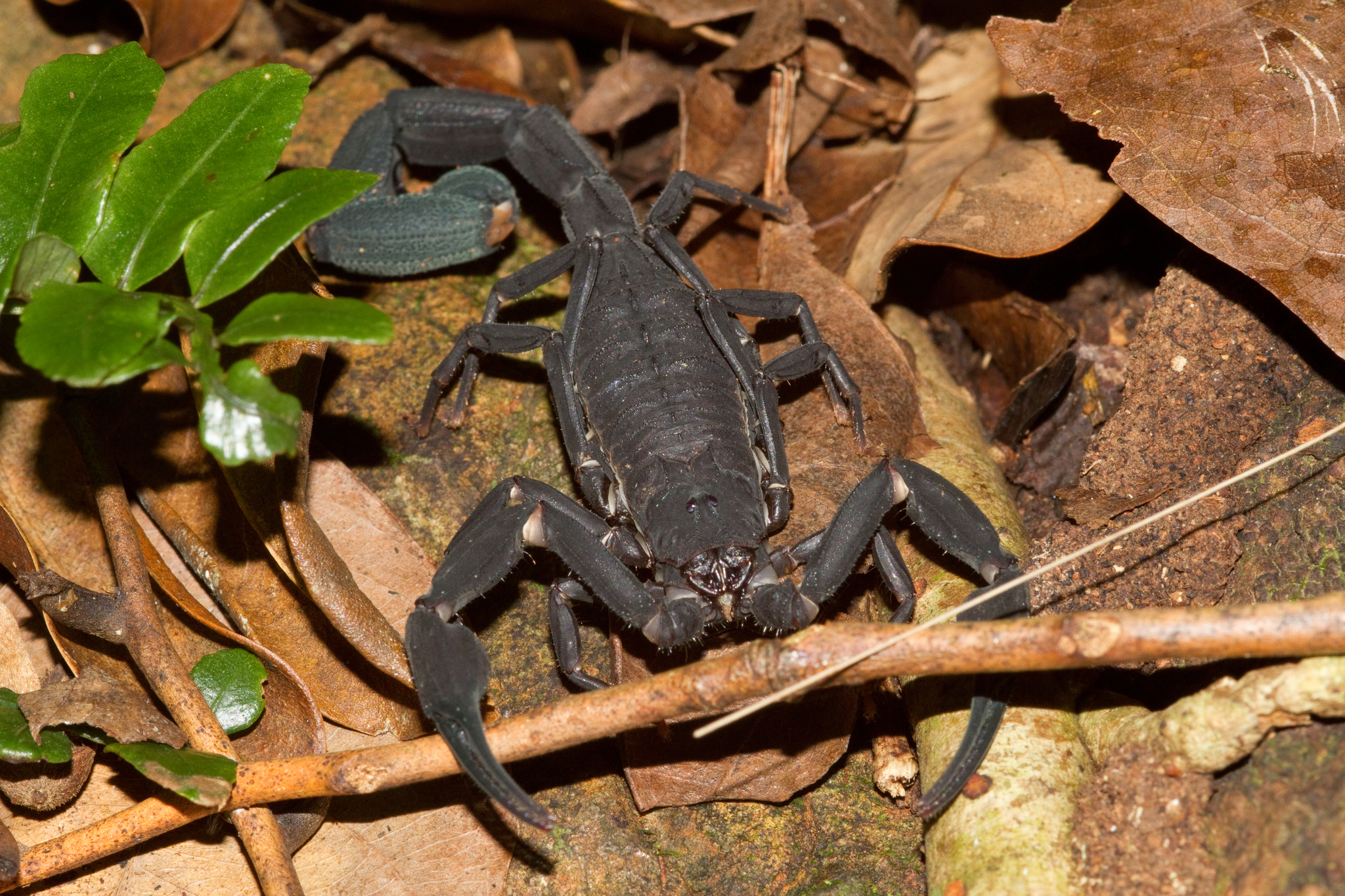
Tityus pachyurus is a member of the family Buthidae found in Panama. It is among the most medically important species.

Scorpionism is defined as the accidental envenomation of humans by scorpions. If the injection of venom in a human results in death, this is defined as scorpionism. This is seen all over the world but is predominantly seen in the tropical and subtropical areas. These areas include Mexico, northern South America and southeast Brazil in the Western hemisphere. In the Eastern hemisphere, scorpionism possess a public health threat in the regions of South Africa, the Middle East, and the Indian subcontinent.

== Species involved ==
Scorpions are nocturnal animals that typically live in deserts, mountains, caves, and under rocks. It is when they are disturbed that they attack. Scorpions that possess the ability to inject venom with their sting belong to the family Buthidae. The Middle East and North Africa are home to the deadliest scorpions, belonging to the genus Buthus, Leiurus, Androctonus, and Hottentotta. In the region of South Africa, the deadliest scorpion belongs to the Tityus genus. In India and Mexico, the deadliest scorpions involved in scorpionism are Mesobuthus and Centruroides, respectively.

In Central America, most scorpion stings are mildly toxic to humans, however, Panama has reported an incidence of 52 cases per 100,000 people in 2007. Between 1998 and 2006, 28 people have died as result of scorpion stings. In Panama, the majority of scorpions responsible for these deaths belong to the genus Tityus. This scorpion genus is also found in parts of northern South America. Historically, the presence of these scorpions in Panama could be due to the closure of the Panamanian isthmus, thus allowing for the migration of the scorpions from Panama into the northern part of South America. Envenomation by this kind of scorpion is characterized by intense local pain, that usually does not result in tissue injury. Scorpions possess poison glands located at the distal extremity of their abdomen. There are currently 1400 known species of scorpions and each possess venom glands. However, of these 1400 scorpions, only 25 are known to be dangerous and can result in death upon injection of their venom. Other countries in Central America are habitat to the scorpion genus Centruroides. Species in this genus are only mildly toxic to humans even though they have ion channel-active toxins in their venom.

== Habitat ==
Scorpions are nocturnal arachnids that have shown a seasonal pattern also related to climate. Specifically in Central America, scorpion attacks are mostly seen during the hot months of the year, noting that in Argentina this occurs in the months of October to April. Additionally, a rainy climate may also change the frequency of scorpion incidents. Lower levels of rainfall, specifically precipitation below 30 mm/month, can be associated with less scorpion stings, whereas rainfall greater than 30 mm/month shows no relationship to incident rate. This could be due to the disruption of the scorpion habitat due to the rain.

== Envenomation ==
Across North America, the Arizona bark scorpion (Centruroides sculpturatus) has proven to be the most venomous scorpion. However, a sting from this arachnid will rarely result in death. Rather side effects of their sting include pain, numbness, tingling, convulsions, difficult breathing, and may sometimes lead to paralysis. These side effects may last up to 72 hours after injection of the venom. It is also observed that penile erection may occur after being stung. The pain of a sting from the Arizona Bark Scorpion has been compared to being struck by a bolt of lightning or electrical current. These symptoms may become visible 4 to 7 minutes after injection of venom.

Envenomation of a human by a scorpion may affect the sympathetic or parasympathetic systems depending on the species of scorpion. Some of the more severe side effects include respiratory distress syndrome, pulmonary edema, cardiac dysfunction, impaired hemostasis, pancreatitis, and multiple organ failure. Additionally, treatment of the sting depends on the severity of the incident ranking from mild, moderate, or severe. This treatment is composed of 3 different aspects of the sting: symptomatic measures, vital functions support, and injection antivenom. Not all envenomation resulting systemic complications; only a small proportion stings have this effect on the victim.

=== Mechanism ===
The composition of scorpion venom consists of different compounds of varying concentrations. The compounds consist of neurotoxins, cardiotoxin, nephrotoxin, hemolytic toxic, phosphodiesterases, phospholipase, histamine, serotonin, etc. Of these different toxins, the most important and most potent one is the neurotoxin concentration. This compound has neuromuscular and neuroautonomic effects, as well as damages the surrounding local tissue. Neurotoxins work to change voltage- dependent sodium channels, resulting in prolonged neuronal and neuromuscular activity. This prolonged activity of sodium channels results in an erection. There may be nerve damage due to the stabilization of voltage-dependent sodium channels in the open conformation. This position leads to the prolonged and continuous firing of neurons in the somatic, sympathetic, and parasympathetic nervous systems. Continuous firing of neurons causes over excitation and prevent the transmission of normal nerve impulses down the axon.

The venom composition of this scorpion contains neurotoxins which is almost completely responsible for this symptom. The poison from this scorpion contain 4 components: chlorotoxin, charybdotoxin, scyllatoxin, and agitoxins. Upon injection with the venom, sacral parasympathetic nerve are stimulated causing a change in the neuronal transmission in vascular and nonvascular smooth muscles. The compound known as the vasoactive intestinal polypeptide (VIP) is the main transmitter. This polypeptide is realized from nerves found long the erectile tissue of the corpus calosum. VIP is the strongest relaxant of penile smooth muscle structure, resulting in an erection upon envenomation. This is the proposed mechanics for all scorpion of the family Buthidae, whose venom composition contains these compounds.

== Use as medication ==
The byproducts of some arthropods may be used as an aphrodisiac. Aphrodisiacs are a group of medicines that may stimulate arousal or sexual desire through the use of drugs. These medicines usually help perform the sexual act and its effects may last a few hours. Some of these arthropods whose byproduct may be used as medicines can be found in North America.
