= Ts15 =

Ts15 (Tityustoxin-15; α-KTx 21.1) is produced by the Brazilian yellow scorpion Tityus serrulatus. It targets voltage-gated potassium channels, primarily the subtypes Kv1.2 and Kv1.3.

== Sources ==
Ts15 can be isolated from the venom of Tityus serrulatus, otherwise known as the Brazilian yellow scorpion. It is the deadliest scorpion toxin in Brazil, with a lethality rate of 0.15%. Ts15 is only one of many neurotoxins that can be found in the venom of Tityus serrulatus.

== Chemistry ==
Ts15 is a peptide with a length of 36 amino acids, which are crosslinked by three disulfide bridges. The 27th position in the amino acid sequence undergoes N-linked glycosylation. Ts15 is a scorpion short toxin. The rest of the structure of the toxin remains unknown so far. Due to its low structural similarity to other members of the α-family (<30%), it cannot be easily compared to them.

== Target ==
Kv channels are the main targets of Ts15. While other members of the α-family generally target both Kv channels and sodium channels (Nav channels), Ts15 only targets Kv channels. It mainly targets Kv1.2 and Kv1.3: it blocks the channel's current by 73% and 50% respectively. When all targeted channels are compared, Ts15 has the highest affinity for Kv1.2 channels. Besides these channels, Ts15 also targets Shaker IR channels, Kv1.6 channels and the Kv2.1 channels. The effects of Ts15 are voltage-independent, meaning it can bind to a channel in any state of activation, and they also are reversible.

== Toxicity and treatment ==
=== Toxicity ===
The LD_{50} of Ts15 is unknown. The symptoms caused solely by Ts15 have not been studied extensively. However, Ts15 is known to block the Kv1.3 channels on autoreactive effector memory T-cells. The binding of the toxin triggers immunosuppression, by decreasing the calcium influx into the cell.

=== Treatment ===
In general, a sting by Tityus serrulatus is treated with scorpion antivenom serum, named Soro antiscorpionico. A human antibody fragment, serrumab, neutralises most of the venom. However, this antibody works on the entire venomous cocktail of the scorpion. Information about treating Ts15 alone is currently unavailable.
