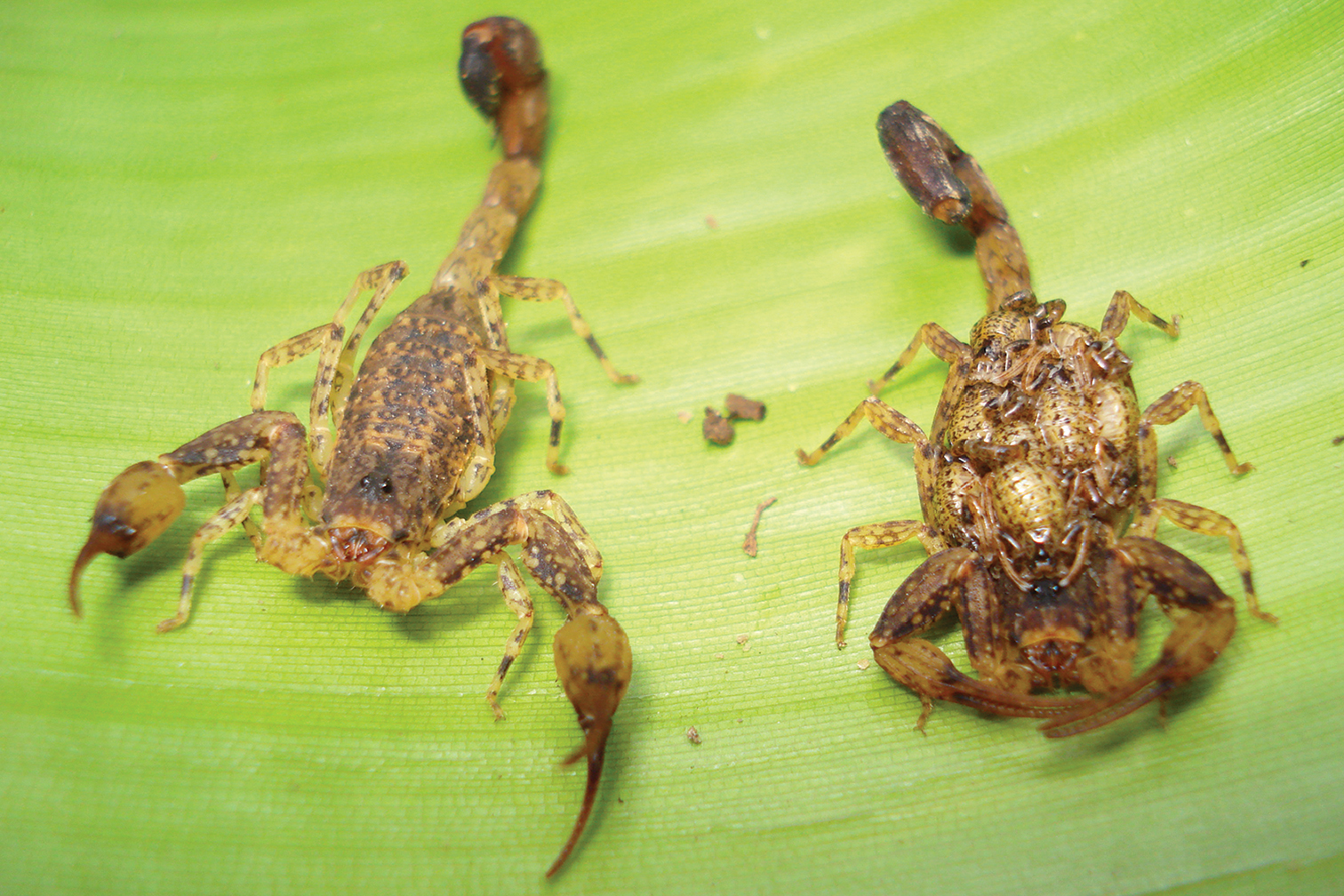

Scientific classification
- Domain: Eukaryota
- Kingdom: Animalia
- Phylum: Arthropoda
- Subphylum: Chelicerata
- Class: Arachnida
- Order: Scorpiones
- Family: Buthidae
- Genus: Tityus
- Species: T. silvestris

Binomial name
- Tityus silvestris Pocock, 1897

= Tityus silvestris =

Species of arachnid

Tityus silvestris is a species of arachnid endemic to northern South America.

== Description ==
It is one of the smallest species in the Buthidae family, growing to between 25 and 45 mm in length. It has a yellowish body, with several dark spots, while the tail and the télson are darker. This species has sexual dysmorphism. The species occurs in northern South America, in French Guiana and Brazil (Amazonas and Para), living in tropical forests. It is believed to feed on crickets and cockroaches.

== Medical significance ==
Before, it was believed that this species was not responsible for serious accidents. However, a 39-year-old man was stung by this species and arrived at the hospital in three hours, with only pain and paraesthesia. Two hours later, he had difficulty in breathing, tachycardia, hypertension and muscle spasms. The condition became more serious and the patient was hospitalized to be discharged seven days later. This makes T. silvestris a kind of medical importance.
