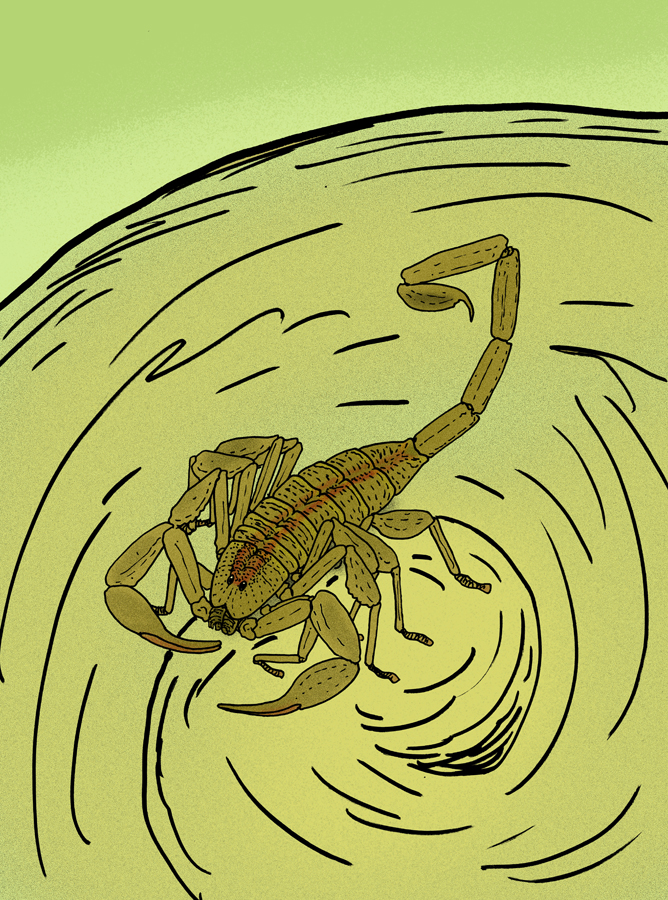
- Artist's restoration

Conservation status
- Extinct

Scientific classification
- Kingdom: Animalia
- Phylum: Arthropoda
- Subphylum: Chelicerata
- Class: Arachnida
- Order: Scorpiones
- Family: Buthidae
- Genus: Tityus
- Species: †T. exstinctus

Binomial name
- †Tityus exstinctus Lourenço, 1995

= Tityus exstinctus =

Species of scorpion

Tityus exstinctus is an extinct species of scorpion belonging to the family Buthidae. It is only known from a single male collected in 1884 in the northern range of Martinique. The species epithet based on the fact that this taxon was already extinct when it was described.

The holotype has a carapace length of 6.9 mm, a metasomal segment I length of 6.6 mm, a metasomal segment V length of 11.1 mm, a vesicle width of 3.2 mm, a femur length of 7.3 mm, a femur width of 2.3 mm, a tibia length of 8.2 mm, a tibia width of 3.3 mm, a chelae length of 14.2 mm, and a chelae width of 4.0 mm. The movable finger with the sting has a length of 8.2 mm.

It was first thought to be a close relative of Tityus trinitatis Pocock, 1897 (from Trinidad and Tobago) but a later study revealed its close relationship to T. pictus and T. smithii.

Prior to its description in 1995 three experts have examined the specimen which is preserved in the Muséum national d'histoire naturelle. Eugène Simon synonymized it with Centrurus insulanus in 1890. Embrik Strand (no date) mentioned it as Scorpio marmoratus. In 1900, Karl Kraepelin was the first who identified it as a new and undescribed species within the genus Tityus.
