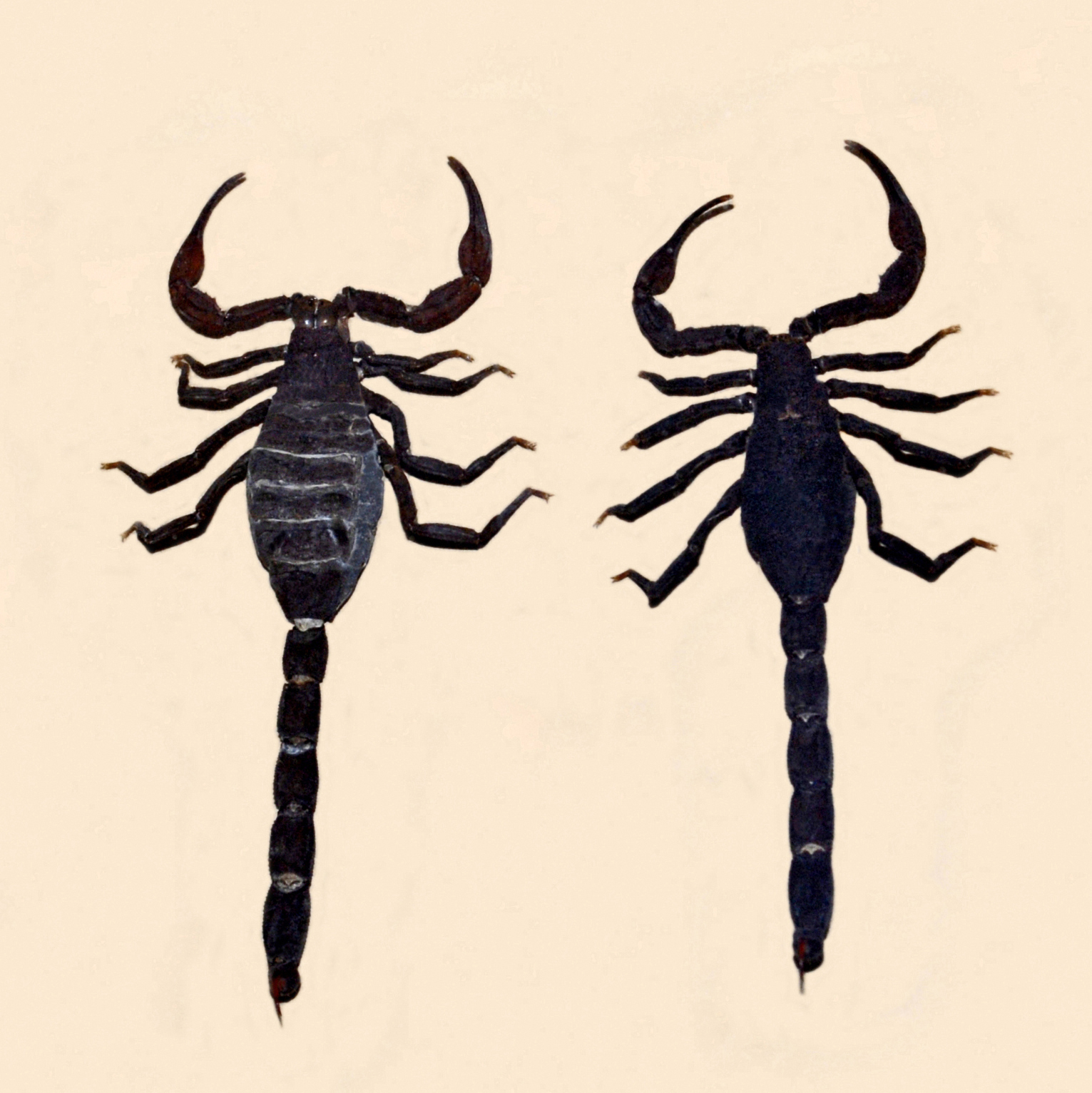
- Tityus pococki from Venezuela

Scientific classification
- Domain: Eukaryota
- Kingdom: Animalia
- Phylum: Arthropoda
- Subphylum: Chelicerata
- Class: Arachnida
- Order: Scorpiones
- Family: Buthidae
- Genus: Tityus
- Species: T. pococki

Binomial name
- Tityus pococki Hirst, 1907

Synonyms
- Tityus kraepelinianus Mello-Leitão, 1931; Tityus flavostictus Schenkel, 1932; Tityus kraepelini Pocock, 1902

= Tityus pococki =

Species of scorpion

Tityus pococki is a species of scorpion belonging to the family Buthidae.

== Distribution ==
This species is present in South America.
