= Tst26 =

Toxin from scorpion venom

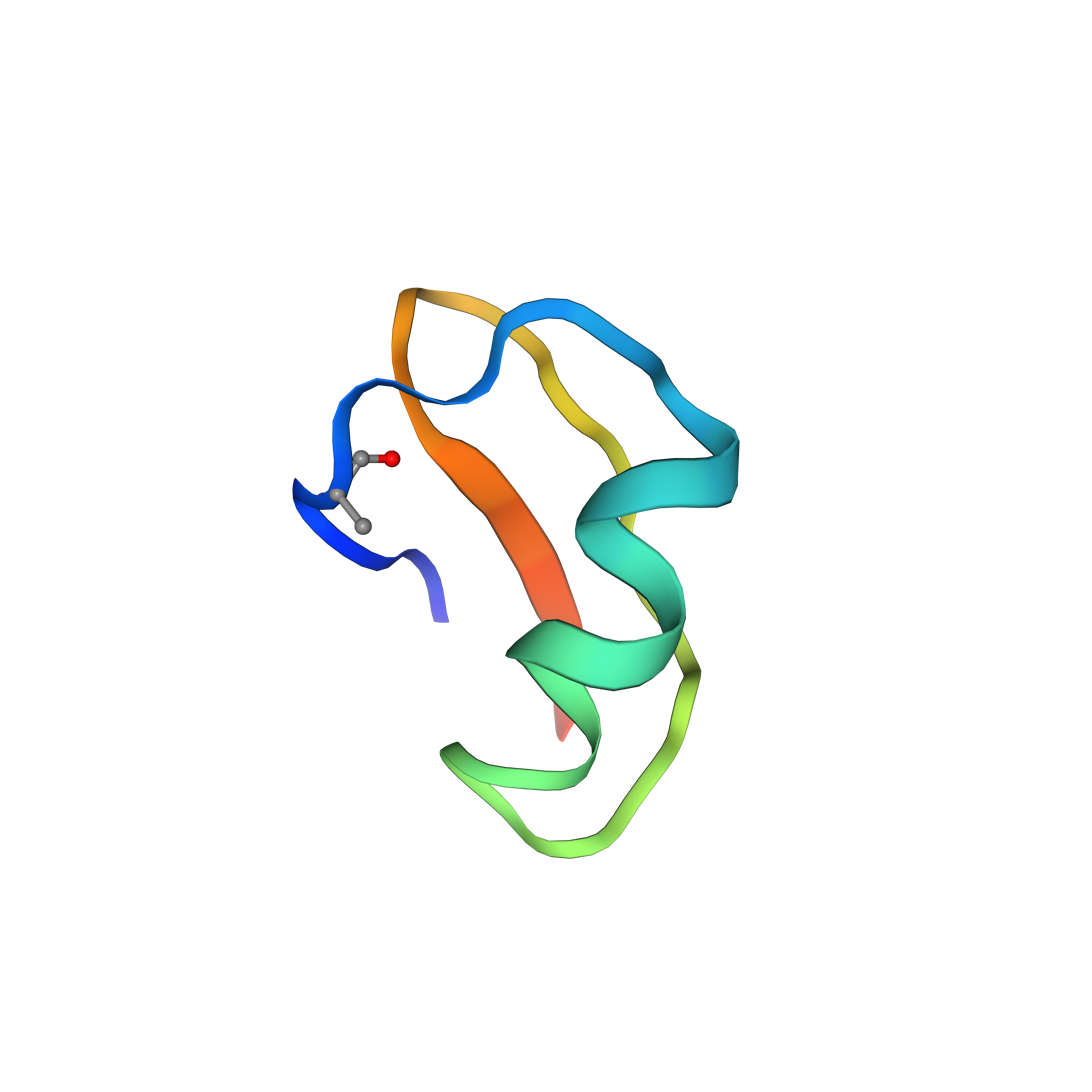
Chemical structure of Tst26, Alpha-KTx 4.6

The Tst26 toxin is a voltage-gated potassium channel blocker present in the venom of Tityus stigmurus, a species of Brazilian scorpion. Tst26 selectively blocks Kv1.2 and Kv1.3 channels.

== Etymology ==
Tst26 is named after the species it was discovered from and a characteristic of the process in which it was obtained. Venom from Tityus stigmurus was analysed using high-performance liquid chromatography (HPLC). Peptides were separated based on the elution time from HPLC, and when the sample which elutes at 26 minutes was sequenced a distinct amino acid sequence was discovered. When this sequence was further characterized, it was revealed to be a unique potassium blocker and was named Tst26. Tst was derived from the abbreviation of the species of scorpion it was discovered from, Tityus stigmurus, and 26 was derived from the elution time of the sample it was obtained from. Tst26 has high sequence similarity with other peptides from the α-KTx 4 family and therefore this toxin has the systematic name α-KTx 4.6.

== Sources ==
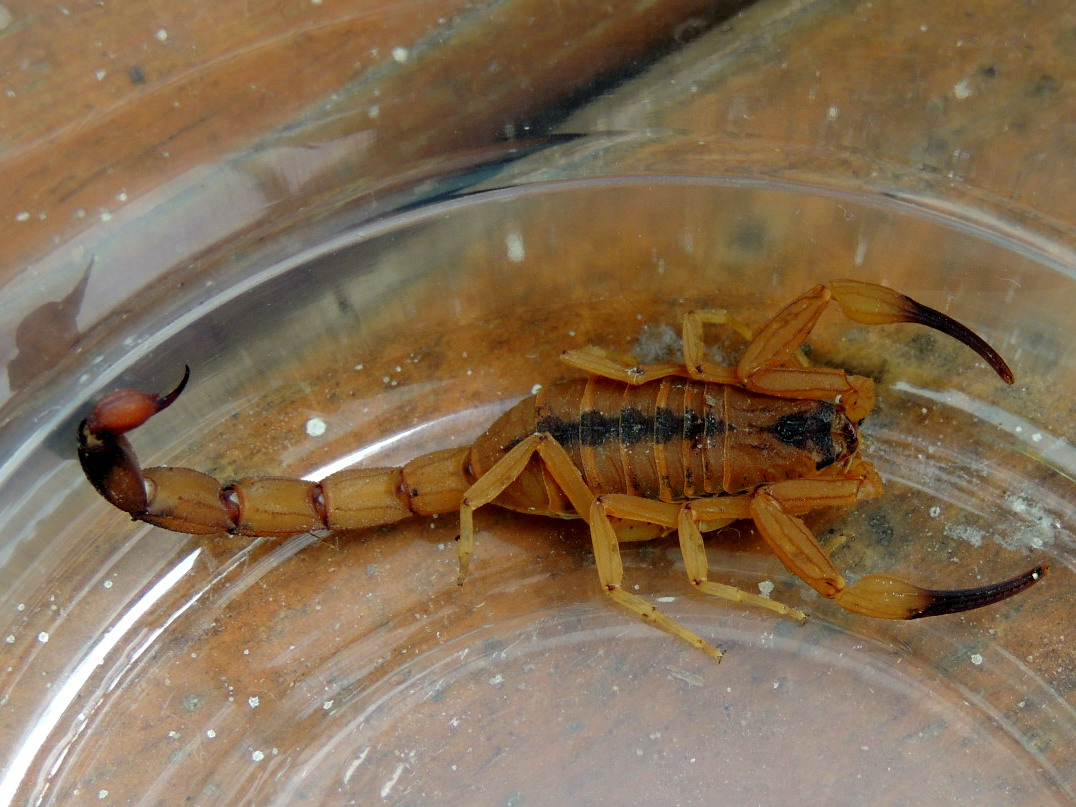
Tityus stigmurus

This toxin was discovered in the venom of the Tityus stigmurus. Tityus stigmurus is a species of Brazilian scorpion found predominantly in the northeastern regions of Brazil.

== Chemistry ==
The chemical structure of Tst26 is similar to the structure of other potassium blocking peptides from scorpion venom. Tst26 comprises 37 amino acids that are tightly connected through three disulfide bridges. The peptide's experimental molecular mass of 3941.0 Da corresponds very well with its theoretical molecular mass of 3940.8 Da. The presence of lysine and tyrosine at position 27 and 36 respectively allows for potassium channel recognition.

== Target ==
Tst26 selectively blocks Kv1.2 and Kv1.3 voltage gated potassium channels and has high affinity to both channels. It has an affinity (Kd) of 1.9 nM for Kv1.2 and of 10.7 nM for Kv1.3. Tst26 did not affect any of the other tested channels Kv1.1, Kv1.4, Kv1.5, hERG, IKCa1, BKCa and Nav1.5.

== Mode of action ==
Tst26 selectively blocks Kv1.2 and Kv1.3 receptors, and it is assumed that Tst26 blocker works as a pore blocker owing to its similarity with other blockers in its family. This toxin does not affect the voltage-dependence of (steady state) activation or inactivation of the potassium channels but did slow down the inactivation of Kv1.3 channels.
