= TsIV =

Scorpion toxin

TsIV is a toxin from the venom of the Brazilian scorpion Tityus serrulatus which slows the inactivation of sodium channels.

== Etymology ==
TsIV is named after the scorpion from which the toxin is isolated, namely Tityus serrulatus (Ts). Alternative names for the TsIV toxin are TsIV-5, Toxin-4, Tityustoxin IV, Ts-IV and Toxin IV.

== Sources ==
TsIV is one of a variety of toxins that can be isolated from the venom of the Brazilian scorpion T.serrulatus. This species of scorpion belongs to the family Buthidae and has a wide geographic distribution from northeastern to southeastern Brazil.

== Chemistry ==
The composition of TsIV determined by spectrophotometry is as follows: 11 Asp, 2 Thr, 3 Ser, 2 Glu, 3 Pro, 4 Gly, 3 Ala, 8 Cys, 2 Val, 2 Ile, 3 Leu, 8/9 Tyr, 1 His, 9 Lys, 2 Trp. The amino acid composition of TsIV also shows great similarity with those of Ts III and Ts V. Ts III has one less Lys and Ts V has an additional Lys and Gly.

== Target and mode of action ==
TsIV belongs to the family of α-scorpion toxins, which are known to bind voltage dependently to site 3, located on domain IV of the sodium channel, and thereby slow the inactivation of sodium channels. This toxin is active against mammals. The application of TsIV to neuroblastoma cells resulted in a slowing of inactivation and an increase in peak current without changing time to peak, leading to the shifting of both the steady-state activation and inactivation curves to more negative potentials. Based on the knowledge that TsIV belongs to the family of α-toxins, it is likely that the effect of TsIV on the inactivation of sodium channels is preceded by the binding of TsIV to site 3 of the sodium channel.

== Toxicity ==
The TsIV toxin, isolated from T. serrulatus venom, does not discriminate between tissue-specific sodium channel subtypes and has been found to affect sodium channels from rat ventricular myocytes, rat cortical neurons and mouse skeletal muscle cells. Clinical manifestations of T. serrulatus envenoming include local pain at the site of the sting and systemic manifestations such as vomiting, profuse sweating, psychomotor agitation or restlessness, sinus tachycardia or bradycardia, arterial hypertension or hypotension, cardiac arrhythmias other than sinus tachycardia or bradycardia, cardiac failure, shock, tachypnea, pulmonary oedema and laboratory abnormalities such as leukocytosis, hyperglycaemia and increased amylase enzyme activity. Martin et al. recorded the toxicity of TsIV as LD_{50} after subcutaneous (s.c.) and intracerebroventricular (i.c.v.) injection. The LD_{50} of TsIV per 20 g mouse was 0.4 μg for s.c. injection and 24 ng for i.c.v. injection.

== Treatment ==
In clinical practice, Tityus poisoning is treated by intravenous administration of heterologous antivenoms. These antivenoms are obtained by the immunisation of horses with a mix of venoms derived from T.Serrulatus and T.Bahiensis. Several preclinical studies have identified epitopes that are present in many different toxins from the T. serrulatus scorpion. This could lead to the development of an antidote that reacts with the same epitope located on these different toxins. Additionally, studies examined reactivity between horse anti-Ts antisera and synthetically produced peptides that corresponded to the amino acid sequence of several Ts toxins, including TsIV. The aim of these studies was to ascertain the neutralizing potential of these antivenoms by examining their reactivity with different epitopes of T.serrulatus toxins.
