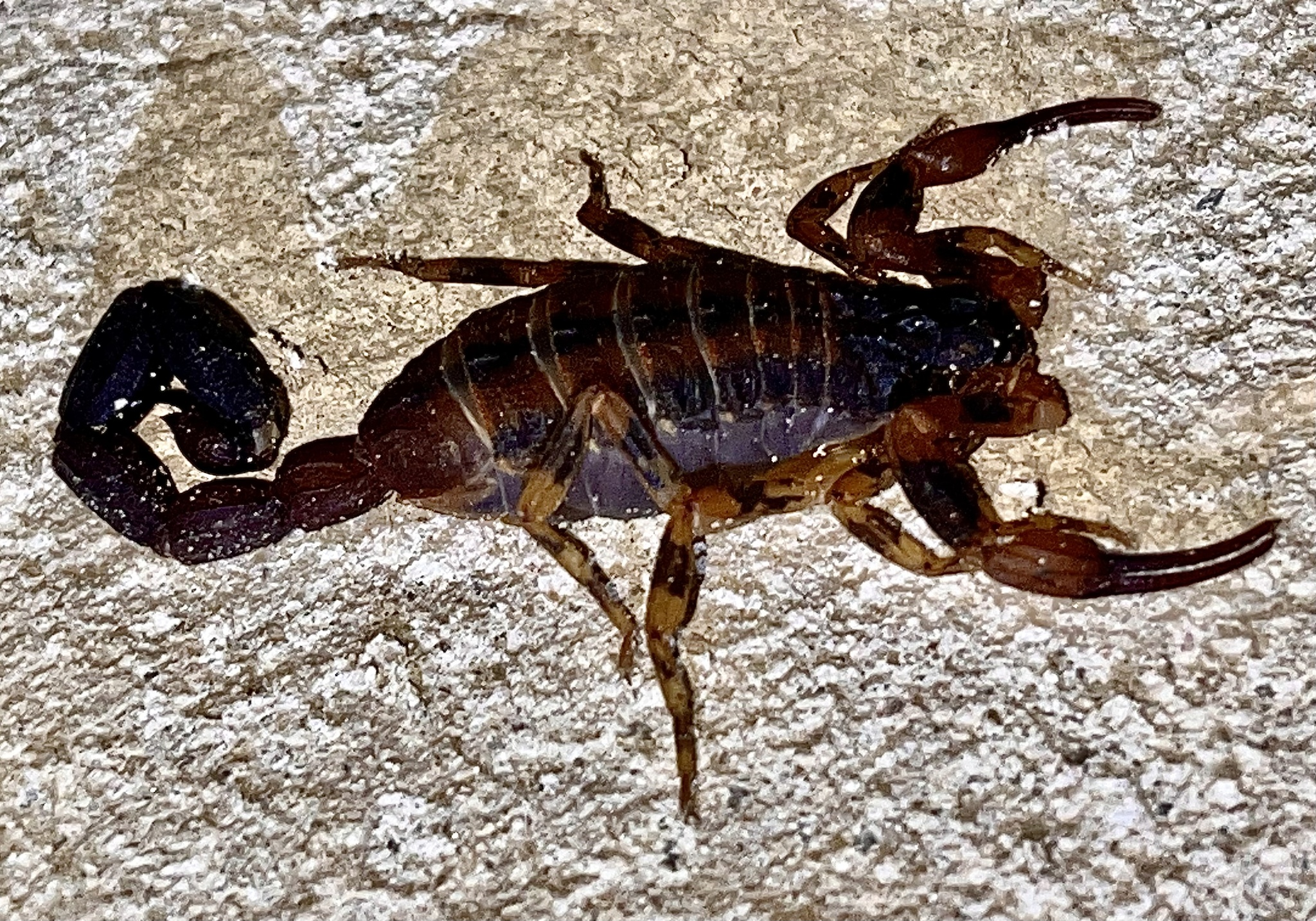

Scientific classification
- Kingdom: Animalia
- Phylum: Arthropoda
- Subphylum: Chelicerata
- Class: Arachnida
- Order: Scorpiones
- Family: Buthidae
- Genus: Tityus
- Species: T. fasciolatus

Binomial name
- Tityus fasciolatus (Pessa, 1935)

= Tityus fasciolatus =

Species of scorpion

Tityus fasciolatus is a species of scorpion from the family Buthidae. The species are 4.5–8.5 centimetres (1.8–3.3 in) in length and are yellowish-brown coloured. They also have three dark stripes over the mesosoma with either yellowish or orange pedipalps, which have dark spots as well. Their first to third segments of metasoma is yellowish-orange, with the fourth one being reddish. Their fifth and final segment id dark red coloured. The species have yellow coloured legs which have dark spots, which are the same as on pedilap. Their tarsus is dark in colour with pectines that have 17-25 teeth, in which they have 16-18 rows of granules. T. fasciolatus is a species of medical importance, its venom is molecular and very similar to T. serrulatus, its venom contains at least 10 toxic fractions, with molecular masses ranging from 6 to 10-80 kDa, the LD_{50} for this species is 2.984 mg/kg (subcutaneous injection).
