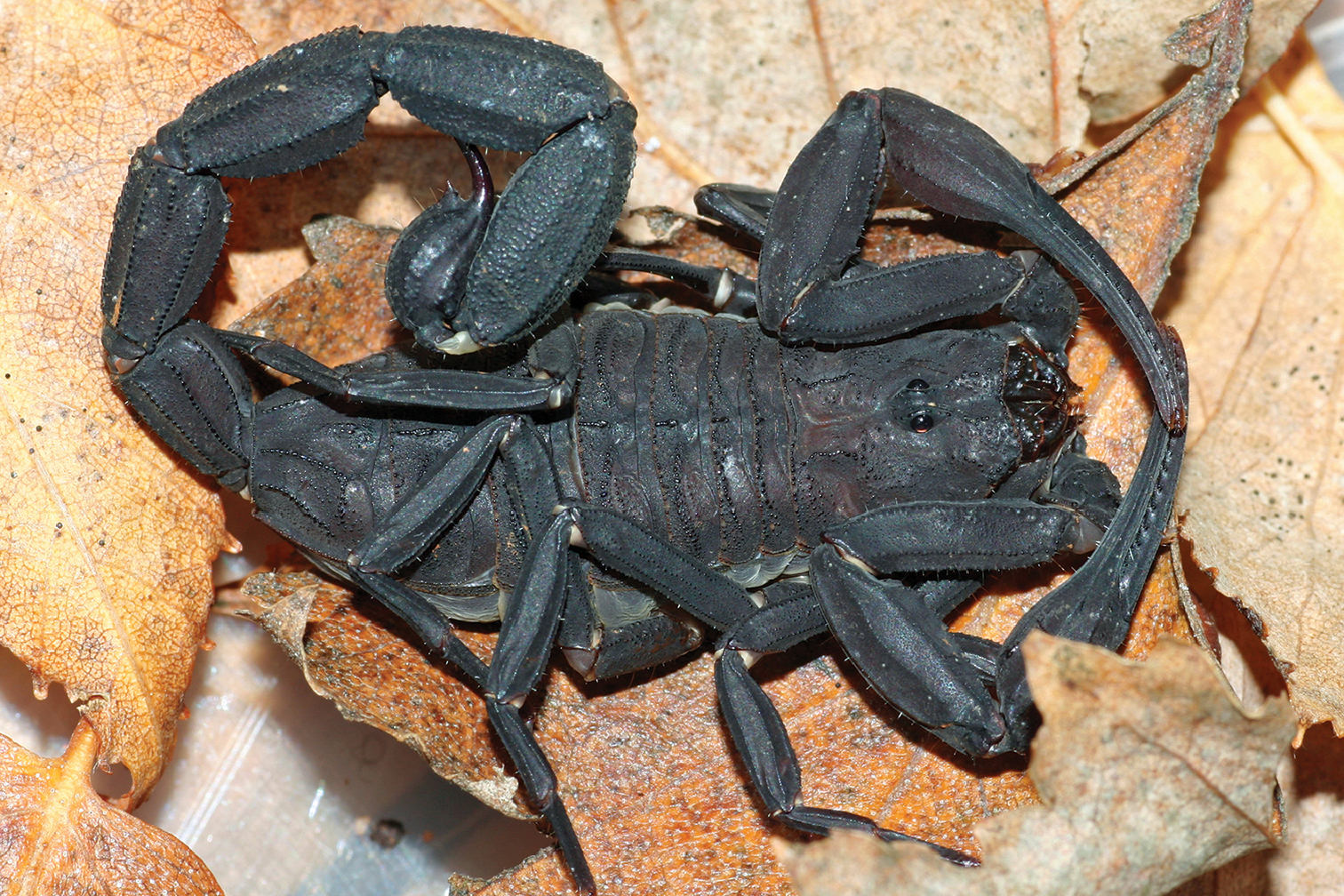

Scientific classification
- Domain: Eukaryota
- Kingdom: Animalia
- Phylum: Arthropoda
- Subphylum: Chelicerata
- Class: Arachnida
- Order: Scorpiones
- Family: Buthidae
- Genus: Tityus
- Species: T. obscurus

Binomial name
- Tityus obscurus Gervais 1843

= Tityus obscurus =

Species of scorpion

Tityus obscurus, known as the Amazonian black scorpion, is a species of scorpion found in northern South America.

== Description and behavior ==
It is one of the largest Tityus species, growing up to 65–100 mm. It is characterized by its black color, flattened body and legs, and relatively thin claws. It is terrestrial and nocturnal. During the day it hides under stones, logs or loose bark, venturing out at night to hunt its prey, chiefly insects and arthropods. Juveniles have a brown body and darkened appendix.

== Range and habitat ==
They are found in the tropical and sub-tropical forests of northern South America, mainly in the amazon rainforest of Brazil, French Guiana and Suriname.

== Venom ==
They have excitatory neurotoxins and cardiotoxins, symptoms already reported in humans include severe local pain, edema, profuse sweating, nausea, vomiting, spreading numbness, muscle twitch, convulsions, semicoma, somnolence, hallucinations, tachypnea, tachycardia, excessive drooling and prostration. In Guyana, a 16-year-old boy died 16 hours after being stung by this species. In Guyana, in a 12-month period three people died, two children and a 30-year-old man. In all these cases, they experienced local pain that soon developed into vomiting and persistent leukocytosis. They all died after developing cardiopulmonary failure and dysrhythmias. The median lethal dose from this species is 3.13 mg / kg (i.p.).

Presumably, Tityus obscurus has been responsible for acute cerebellar dysfunction with neuromuscular manifestations in 58 patients in Santarém, Pará, Brazil. Symptoms such as cerebellar ataxia, dysdiadochokinesia, dysmetria, dysarthria, dyslalia, nausea and vomiting where reported to last for up to two days. Some patients presented myoclonus and fasciculations. Two had intense rhabdomyolysis and acute kidney injury.
