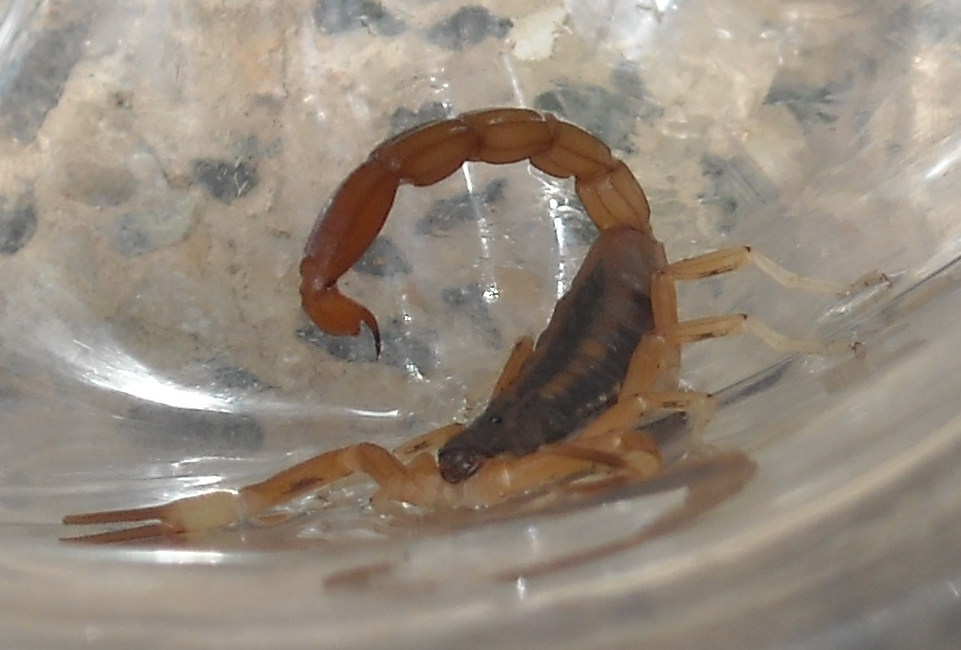

Scientific classification
- Domain: Eukaryota
- Kingdom: Animalia
- Phylum: Arthropoda
- Subphylum: Chelicerata
- Class: Arachnida
- Order: Scorpiones
- Family: Buthidae
- Genus: Tityus
- Species: T. trivittatus

Binomial name
- Tityus trivittatus Kraepelin, 1898

= Tityus trivittatus =

Species of scorpion

Tityus trivittatus, commonly known as the Brazilian red house scorpion, is a species of arachnid endemic to South America.

== Description and behavior ==
The scorpions grow on average 50–70 mm in length, the body is yellow or reddish-yellow on the back, with pale, yellow or yellow-brown legs, pedipalps and tail, also the legs and pedipalps may have dark segmented marks, the body of the immature is reddish, with dark spots on the leg.

Like most scorpions, T. trivittatus is nocturnal and terrestrial, it usually digs under the edges of rocks and logs, or scales rougher surfaces. It is not usually aggressive, but it can attack to defend itself, when mishandled, stepped on, and stuck in clothes when the person is dressing.

== Distribution and habitat ==
It is a species native to South America, found in Brazil, Argentina, Paraguay, and Uruguay, it is a common species in human habitations. They are found in stones, rubble, bricks, logs, cracks, in floors and baseboards and pipes.

== Diet ==
T. trivittatus feeds on insects and other arthropods, like spiders, cockroaches and crickets. It uses its tweezers to immobilize the prey, and injects the toxin with the stinger.

== Venom ==
T. trivittatus is the main responsible for more serious accidents in Argentina. A study on the epidemiological clinical aspects of T. trivittatus in Argentina found that the symptoms included pain (85%), edema (26.6%), local burning (24.7%) erythema (20.7%) and local itching (12%); neurological symptoms included paresthesia, cramps, excitation and headache, cardiovascular symptoms involved pallor (18.8%) and tachycardia (18.2%). Dyspnea, hypotension, cardiac arrhythmias, cyanosis, bradycardia and precordial pain occurred in 5% of the cases, along with hypothermia. Vomiting, nausea and sweating also occurred, while headache, arthralgia and paresthesia were mild. The severity of accidents is related to the age group and the amount of venom injected.
