= Tityus tenuicauda =

Scientific classification
- Kingdom: Animalia
- Phylum: Arthropoda
- Subphylum: Chelicerata
- Class: Arachnida
- Order: Scorpiones
- Family: Buthidae
- Genus: Tityus
- Species: T. tenuicauda

Binomial name
- Tityus tenuicauda Prendini, 2001

Species of scorpion

Tityus tenuicauda is a species of scorpions in the family Buthidae. This species was believed to be endemic to the island of Trinidad in Trinidad and Tobago. The distribution range of T. tenuicauda has been extended westward until Las Melenas, a location in the western side of Paria Peninsula National Park, Sucre State, northeastern Venezuela.
