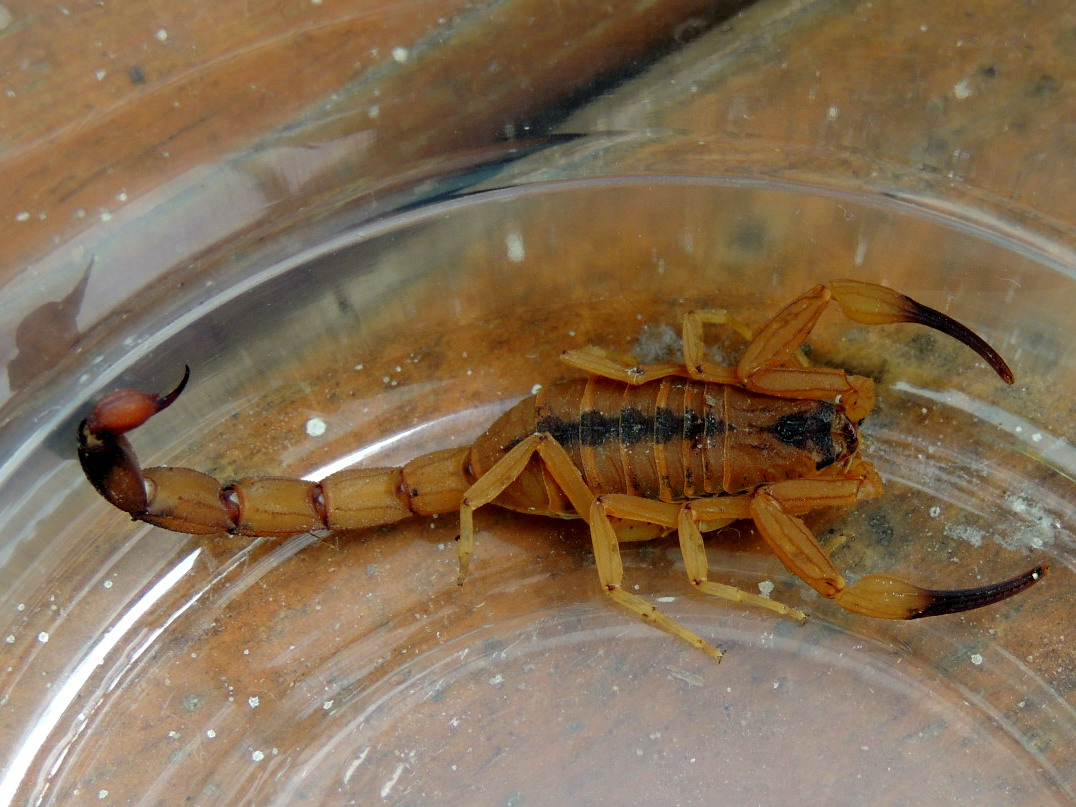

Scientific classification
- Kingdom: Animalia
- Phylum: Arthropoda
- Subphylum: Chelicerata
- Class: Arachnida
- Order: Scorpiones
- Family: Buthidae
- Genus: Tityus
- Species: T. stigmurus

Binomial name
- Tityus stigmurus (Thorell, 1876)

= Tityus stigmurus =

Species of scorpion

Tityus stigmurus is a species of scorpion from the family Buthidae that can be found in Brazil. The species are 4.5–6 centimetres (1.8–2.4 in) in length and are either golden-tan or yellowish-brown coloured. It takes them a year to mature into an adult, which makes them a fast-growing species. They also have a dark stripe over the mesosoma with either yellowish or orange pedipalps.

== Diet ==
In captivity, this species is fed on cockroaches and crickets. It is suggested that Shelfordella lateralis is a good species of cockroaches, that are abundant worldwide. Aside from being abundant, they also are the easiest prey, since they don't hide, and the scorpion can easily eat them.

== Distribution ==
This species is predominantly found in the northeastern parts of Brazil, especially in the Caatinga region. The presence of this species has also been reported in a number of other Brazilian states.

== As a pet ==
The species could be housed as pets, and they can live communally once into their 2nd instar. Mothers tend to eat the young on case-by-case basis. Another thing to consider if owning such species is that they need something to climb on. A cork bark is a nice climbing tool for such species. It's best to lean it against the side of the enclosure or layer it to provide ample climbing space. Artificial lights can be used too, since the same tool is used for reptiles and aquariums alike (a comparison for what is adequate for vertebrates versus arthropods versus planned flora should be considered). The container in which they need to live is supposed to be of 3.8–5 centimetres (1.5–2.0 in) deep and moistured. Peat moss must be provided, even though the species are not burrowers. Moss should be cleaned every two weeks. Scorpions of this species do not require water, since they acquire moisture from their prey. The temperature in the container must be at 75–90 °F or 24–32 °C for the species to survive and reproduce.

== Reproduction ==
The species is facultatively parthenogenetic. The females give birth in 3 months, with the period being as long as 4–5 months. Various gestation periods are different, and can take maximum from 9–12 months. The gestation can be shortened if the temperature is warm enough. The brood size is from 2–16, with an average of 8.

== Emergency sting procedures ==
The species is venomous, and therefore shouldn't be disturbed. Its venom contains the neurotoxins Tst1 and Tst26. T. stigmurus has a recorded LD50 of 0.575 mg/ kg in mice, which is significant. In the state of Bahia, Brazil, in a period from January 1982 to December 1995, 237 patients proven to be stung by Tityus stigmurus, of these 237, information on symptoms was obtained from only 90 patients, symptoms in another 147 patients were not published, the symptoms were classified as local (pain, numbness, erythema, edema, paraesthesia, spot lesion, hyperemia, anesthesia, itching, wheal, burning, flushing and cramping), general (headache, sweating, cold extremities, hypothermia, ocular congestion and cyanosis), digestive (vomiting and nausea), neurological (tremors, agitation, difficulty moving, contractures and dizziness), cardiovascular (hypotension) and respiratory (dyspnea). Other systemic symptoms reported by this species include diaphoresis, somnolence, tachycardia, sialorrhea, pallor, convulsions, abdominal pain, tachypnea, bradycardia, chills, fainting and hypotonia.

However, if the person does get stung by them the person needs to:

- Use an ice pack to cool the burn
- Go to the hospital
- Make sure to be assessed for common severe complications related to scorpion stings, such as acute kidney injury and pancreatitis.
- Venom extraction kits were tested and proven to be ineffective in mitigating or preventing envenomation and causes more tissue trauma on the wound area due to the suction of the apparatus.
