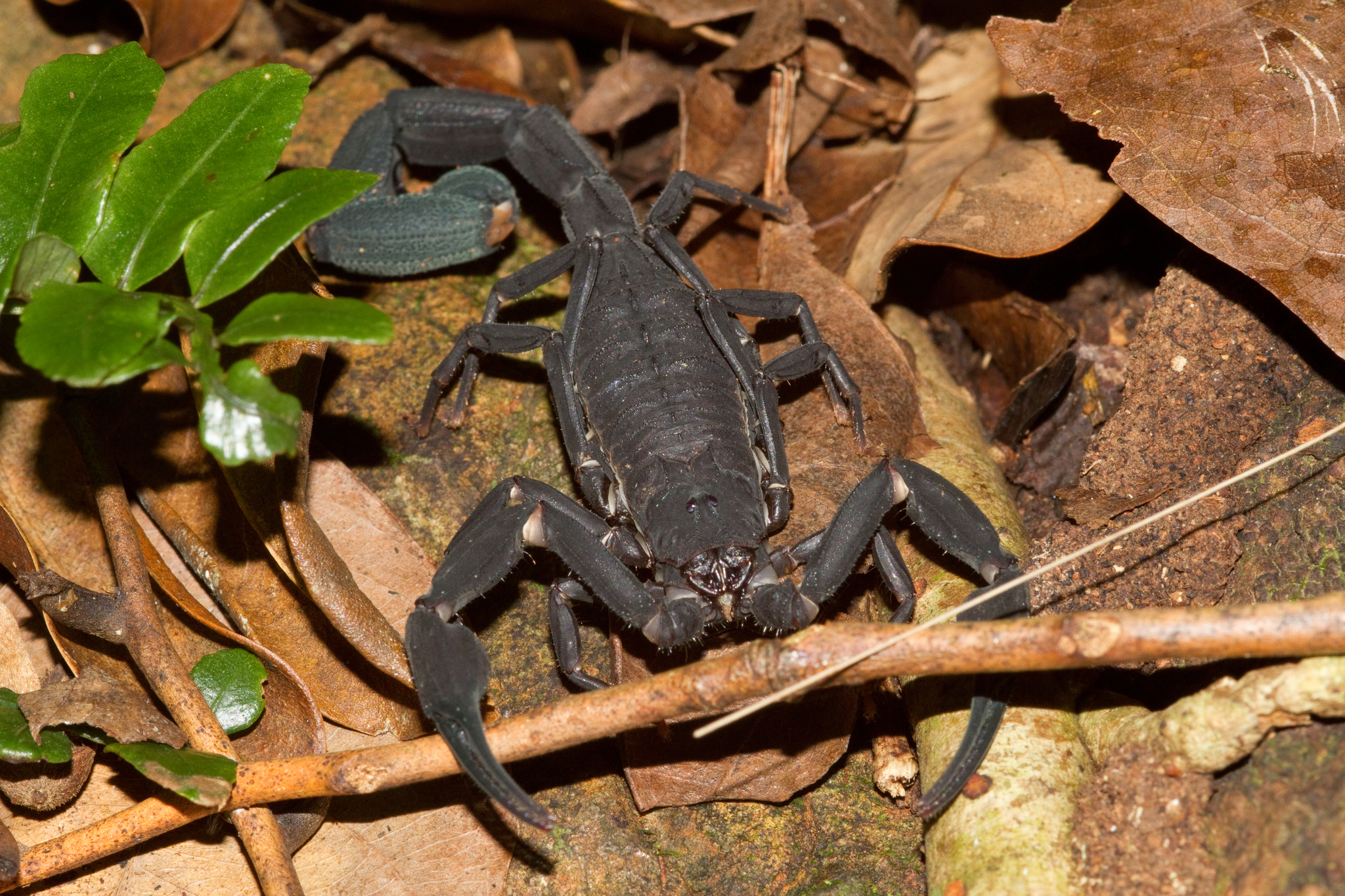

Scientific classification
- Kingdom: Animalia
- Phylum: Arthropoda
- Subphylum: Chelicerata
- Class: Arachnida
- Order: Scorpiones
- Family: Buthidae
- Genus: Tityus
- Species: T. pachyurus

Binomial name
- Tityus pachyurus Pocock, 1897

= Tityus pachyurus =

Species of scorpion

Tityus pachyurus is a species of scorpion endemic to Central America and South America.

== Characteristics ==
Tityus pachyurus can grow from 6 to 9 cm in length Its pedipalps are reddish, while the fourth and fifth segments of the post-abdomen are dark and thicker. Feeding is based on larvae of beetles (tenebrians) and cockroaches. This species occurs in Central America (Costa Rica and Panama) and in South America (Colombia). In Colombia this species occurs in the departments of Antioquia and Chocó. It is found mainly in tropical forests, urban regions and places with high tourist and industrial activity. Like many scorpions, it is nocturnal.

== Medical significance ==
It is the species responsible for the most serious accidents involving scorpions in Central America and Colombia, including children. In Colombia, a case of a 12-year-old boy was reported. Stung in the thigh, the victim had considerable pain at the site, and the case quickly progressed to systemic effects, with myocardial dysfunction, cardiovascular collapse, cardiac arrest and pulmonary edema. This species has a median lethal dose of 4.8 mg per kg.

Its venom is considered one of the most toxic, and responsible for the highest percentage of scorpion sting patient admission to hospitals in Colombia. Envenomation by this species can present symptoms such as tachycardia, diaphoresis, tachypnea, cyanosis, hypertension and bradycardia. In cardiovascular compromise, and cardiac arrest and pulseless ventricular tachycardia are also present.
