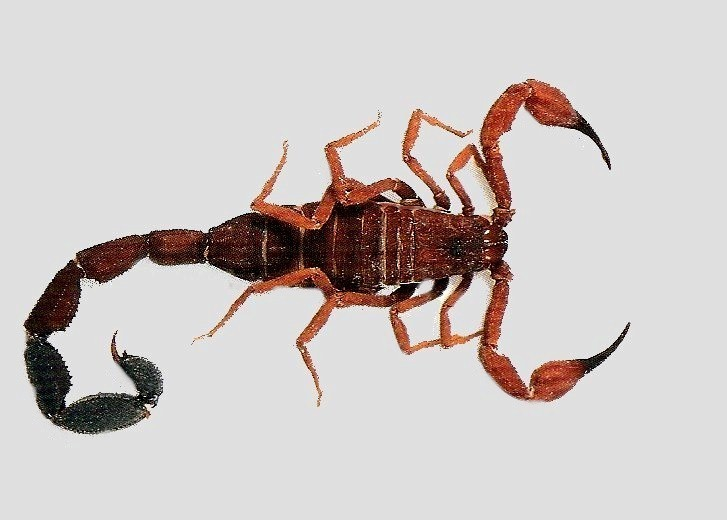

Scientific classification
- Kingdom: Animalia
- Phylum: Arthropoda
- Subphylum: Chelicerata
- Class: Arachnida
- Order: Scorpiones
- Family: Buthidae
- Genus: Tityus
- Species: T. discrepans

Binomial name
- Tityus discrepans (Pocock, 1897)

= Tityus discrepans =

Species of scorpion

Tityus discrepans is a species of scorpion found in northern and north-eastern South America.

== Description and behavior ==
Tityus discrepans can grow up to 71 mm (males) and 60 mm (females), has a reddish-brown body and pedipalps, and light legs, juveniles can be light yellow-brown, with the rest of the body with black areas. Like several scorpions, it has nocturnal habits, feeds on spiders, forks, cockroaches, butterflies and has even been noted to prey on other scorpions. It is a solitary animal, meeting other members of its species only during the mating season.

== Range and habitat ==
Tityus discrepans is found in Brazil, Suriname, Venezuela, Guyana and Trinidad and Tobago, inhabits wooded areas, under leaves and rocks, orchids, bromeliads, cracks and bark. This species also occurs in human habitations, where it has already been reported on sheets, clothing and shoes.

== Reproduction ==
Reproduction can occur at any time and several times a year, the way of reproduction is sexual, the male performs a dance, where it immobilizes the females and takes her to where he deposited the sperm cell (sperm bag). The female can produce 15-30 cubs, which are born fully developed, and are located on the mother's back.

== Medical significance ==
Tityus discrepans is considered a serious public health problem in Venezuela, being dangerous for all ages, especially children and the elderly, the sting of this species can result in piloerection, dyspnea, excessive salivation, cramps, fever and vomiting. In severe cases, heart failure, pulmonary edema and pancreatitis occur. The venom of this species is composed of 80 types of toxins, 6 of which are Bactridines, which inhibit the sodium channels in the nervous system, and 10 of which are considered dangerous to humans, due to their low molecular weight, it travels quickly through the bloodstream and attacks the heart, lungs and pancreas.
