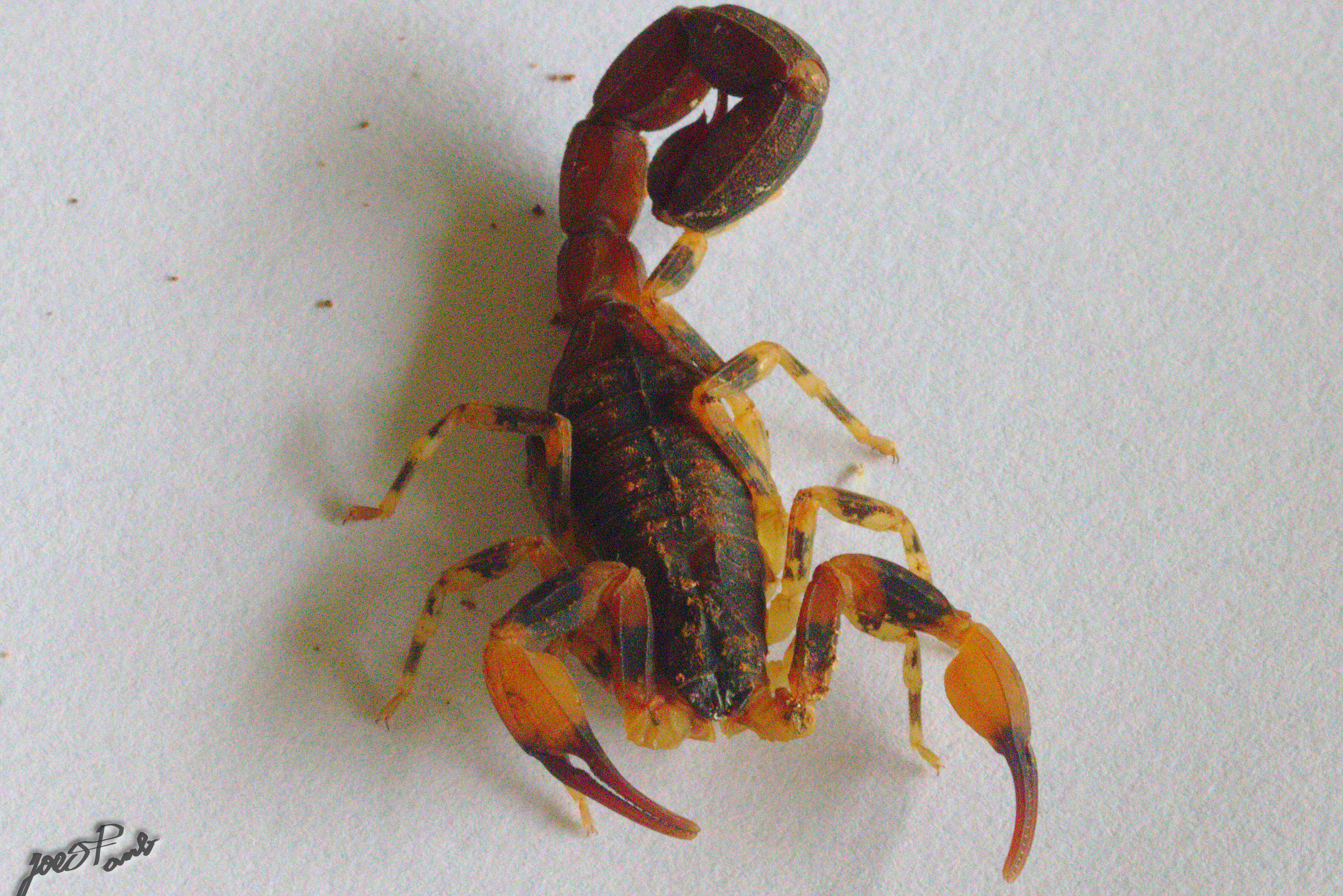

Scientific classification
- Kingdom: Animalia
- Phylum: Arthropoda
- Subphylum: Chelicerata
- Class: Arachnida
- Order: Scorpiones
- Family: Buthidae
- Genus: Tityus
- Species: T. bahiensis

Binomial name
- Tityus bahiensis (Perty, 1833)

Subspecies
- Tityus bahiensis bahiensis (Perty, 1833); Tityus bahiensis eickstedtae Lourenço, 1982

= Tityus bahiensis =

Species of scorpion

Tityus bahiensis is a medically important scorpion endemic to South America.

== Description and behavior ==
It usually reaches 6 cm in length. Its cephalothorax and tergites are dark, with reddish brown above, light legs with black spots, pedipalp is usually light brown, with a dark brown on the part of the tibia, the post-abdomen is pale brown, but often reddish-brown. its telson is reddish, the tips of the pincers and the stinger are brown or black, which is a way of identifying the species. the immature, are often reddish. Tityus bahiensis is a nocturnal scorpion, and not aggressive; they generally avoid humans, but if threatened will defend themselves.

== Diet in captivity ==
It feeds on cockroaches, mealworms, crickets, spiders and insect larvae.

== Range and habitat ==
The species occurs in Brazil (Minas Gerais, Goias, Sao Paulo, Mato Grosso do Sul and Parana), Argentina and Paraguay. The species is very common in agricultural areas.

== Reproduction ==
Mating can occur at any time of the year, but usually in November to April; the gestation time varies from 2 to 12 months, giving birth to between 2 and 25 offspring.

== Venom ==
It is primarily responsible for envenomation cases in rural areas, and is often cited as the second most toxic of its kind, behind only T. serrulatus. Its neurotoxic venom causes symptoms such as severe pain, edema, sweating, lethargy, tachycardia, pulmonary edema, dyspnea, pancreatitis, gastrointestinal complications, nausea, vomiting and changes in blood pressure. The LD_{50} for its venom is 0.5 mg/kg. The most prevalent toxin found in the venom of T. bahiensis is Tb1, accounting for 10% of the entire soluble venom content.
