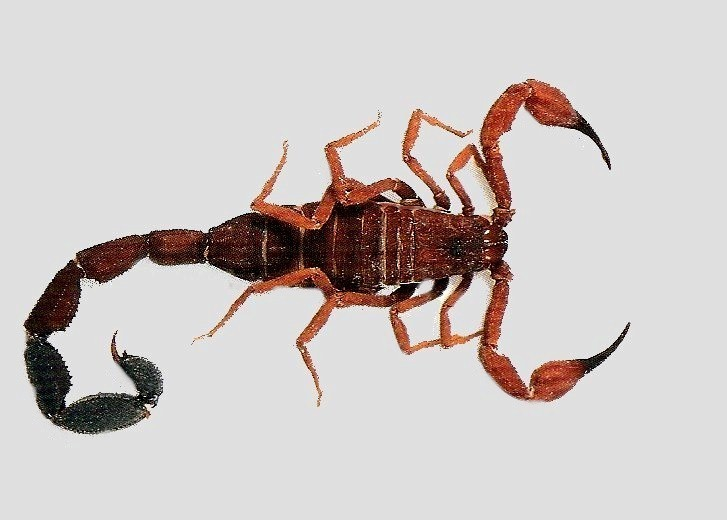
- Tityus discrepans

Scientific classification
- Kingdom: Animalia
- Phylum: Arthropoda
- Subphylum: Chelicerata
- Class: Arachnida
- Order: Scorpiones
- Family: Buthidae
- Genus: Tityus; Koch, 1836

Species
- More than 200, see text

= Tityus (genus) =

Tityus Temporal range: Palaeogene–present

Genus of scorpions

Tityus is a large genus of thick-tailed scorpions (family Buthidae), the namesake of its subfamily Tityinae. As of 2021, Tityus contains more than 220 described species distributed in Central America and South America, from Costa Rica to Argentina. Species in the genus Tityus have been studied for hundreds of years, long before the taxonomic classification was put in place. Tityus tend to be of medium size for scorpions, roughly 50 to 70 millimeters long. They are dark brown or red in color, and can exhibit sexual dimorphism. They can live in a variety of environments, ranging from urban to arid mountains to the Amazon Rainforest. Tityus scorpions are best known for their venom and potent sting. The genus contains several dangerously venomous scorpions, the best known of which is the Brazilian yellow scorpion, T. serrulatus. Its venom can cause severe illness (including pancreatitis), and in the young, old and infirm even death. Some experts have argued that the genus as a whole may be paraphyletic, which could explain the knowledge gaps related to Tityus.

== Geography ==
Scorpions in the genus Tityus can live in several distinct environments across South America. However, there appears to be a clear geographic distinction that exists between species. A species that inhabits the Andes Mountains will not also live in the Amazon Rainforest. In some South American countries, such as Argentina, the geographic range of Tityus scorpions is expanding. This creates a problem for the general public and healthcare. When scorpion stings become more frequent, it puts more strain on hospitals and healthcare facilities.

== Venom ==
The genus Tityus is most well known for its venomous species. Tityus serrulatus venom contains a powerful neurotoxin that affects almost all anatomical body systems. The most dangerous species in the genus Tityus is serrulatus. The nature of their venom and its ability to impact the entire body make Tityus serrulatus a particularly dangerous species. However, their stings are not often lethal, which may be due to low venom mass injected. Young children and seniors are at a higher risk of death than the general population. Many factors are important for determining how dangerous a scorpion sting will be. Variables such as venom composition, location of the sting, and the overall health makeup of the victim in question play a role in determining the lethality of a sting. Scorpion stings are the most common cause of envenomation in Brazil, and are seen as a risk in urban environments. Scorpions in the genus Tityus have been studied by medical researchers for the purpose of identifying and understanding the toxins produced by various species.

== Behavior ==
Little is yet understood about scorpion behavior in the genus Tityus. This is especially true of reproductive aspects, although some general patterns are known. Unlike the majority of arachnids that are oviparous, (i.e. hatching from eggs), in contrast all scorpions including those of the genus Tityus are viviparous, with live births. Notably, several species of Tityus (including Tityus serrulatus) are parthenogenic, a process that allows females to reproduce without fertilization. This survival strategy may contribute to their success in challenging environments. When in contrast the two sexes undergo a mating process, the females can use chemical communication to induce male courtship. After being exposed to compounds associated with female scorpions, the males will alter their activity and perform behaviors characteristic of courtship.

Tityus, like other scorpions use the stingers for both subduing prey items but also for defense, which is a behavior demonstrated by both sexes. Venom is energetically expensive to create, so scorpions only use their stinger defensively when seriously threatened.

== Diet ==
Scorpions in the genus Tityus are carnivores. They feed on insects such as cockroaches and crickets. It is believed that members of the genus Tityus can survive for over a year without food, and even give birth after lengthy periods of starvation. This is another survival technique that helps them outlast unfavorable conditions.

== Species ==
- Tityus aba Candido, Lucas, de Souza, Diaz & Lira-da-Silva, 2005
- Tityus abudi Armas, 1999
- Tityus acananensis González-Sponga, 2009
- Tityus adisi Lourenço, 2002
- Tityus adrianoi Lourenço, 2003
- Tityus ahincoi González-Sponga, 2001
- Tityus altithronus Armas, 1999
- Tityus anasilviae Armas & Abud Antun, 2004
- Tityus androcottoides (Karsch, 1879)
- Tityus anduzei González-Sponga, 1997
- Tityus angelesae Santiago-Blay, 2009
- Tityus anneae Lourenço, 1997
- Tityus antioquensis Lourenço & Otero Patiño, 1998
- Tityus apiacas Lourenço, 2002
- †Tityus apozonalli Riquelme, Villegas & González, 2015
- Tityus arellanoparrai González-Sponga, 1985
- Tityus argentinus Borelli, 1899
- Tityus asthenes Pocock, 1893
- Tityus atriventer Pocock, 1897
- Tityus bahiensis (Perty, 1833)
- Tityus bahoruco Teruel & Armas, 2006
- Tityus barquisimetanus González-Sponga, 1994
- Tityus bastosi Lourenço, 1984
- Tityus bellulus Armas, 1999
- Tityus betschi Lourenço, 1992
- Tityus birabeni Abalos, 1955
- Tityus blanci Lourenço, 1994
- Tityus blaseri Mello-Leitão, 1931
- Tityus boconoensis González-Sponga, 1981
- Tityus bolivianus Kraepelin, 1895
- Tityus brazilae Lourenço & Eickstedt, 1984
- Tityus breweri González-Sponga, 1997
- Tityus cachipalensis González-Sponga, 2002
- Tityus caesarbarrioi González-Sponga, 2001
- Tityus canopensis Lourenço, 2002
- Tityus carabobensis González-Sponga, 1987
- Tityus carinatoides Mello-Leitão, 1945
- Tityus caripitensis Quiroga, deSousa & Parrilla-Alvarez, 2000
- Tityus carvalhoi Mello-Leitão, 1945
- Tityus cerroazul Lourenço, 1986
- Tityus championi Pocock, 1898
- Tityus charalaensis Mello-Leitão, 1940
- Tityus charreyroni Vellard, 1932
- Tityus chilensis Lourenço, 2005
- Tityus cisandinus Lourenço & Ythier, 2017
- Tityus clathratus C. L. Koch, 1844
- Tityus columbianus (Thorell, 1876)
- Tityus confluens Borelli, 1899
- Tityus costatus (Karsch, 1879)
- Tityus crassicauda (Lourenço, 2013)
- Tityus crassimanus (Thorell, 1876)
- Tityus cuellari Lourenço, 1994
- Tityus culebrensis González-Sponga, 1994
- Tityus cylindricus (Karsch, 1879)
- Tityus dasyurus Pocock, 1897
- Tityus dedoslargos Francke & Stockwell, 1987
- Tityus demangei Lourenço, 1981
- Tityus dinizi Lourenço, 1997
- Tityus discrepans (Karsch, 1879)
- Tityus dorae González-Sponga, 2001
- Tityus duacaensis González-Sponga, 2007
- Tityus dulceae González-Sponga, 2006
- Tityus dupouyi González-Sponga, 1987
- Tityus ebanoverde Armas, 1999
- Tityus ecuadorensis Kraepelin, 1896
- Tityus elii (Armas & Marcano Fondeur, 1992)
- Tityus elizabethae Lourenço & Ramos, 2004
- Tityus elizabethebravoi González-Sponga & Wall Gonzalez, 2007
- Tityus engelkei Pocock, 1902
- Tityus estherae Santiago-Blay, 2009
- Tityus evandroi Mello-Leitão, 1945
- † Tityus exstinctus Lourenço, 1995
- Tityus fasciolatus Pessôa, 1935
- Tityus festae Borelli, 1899
- Tityus filodendron González-Sponga, 1981
- Tityus florezi Lourenço, 2000
- Tityus footei Chamberlin, 1916
- Tityus forcipula (Gervais, 1843)
- Tityus fuhrmanni Kraepelin, 1914
- Tityus funestus Hirst, 1911
- Tityus gaffini Lourenço, 2000
- Tityus gasci Lourenço, 1982
- Tityus gonzalespongai Quiroga, de Sousa, Parrilla-Alvarez & Manzanilla, 2004
- Tityus guaricoensis Gonzalez-Sponga, 2004
- Tityus horacioi Lourenço & Leguin, 2011
- Tityus imei Borges, de Sousa & Manzanilla, 2006
- Tityus indecisus Mello-Leitão, 1934
- Tityus insignis (Pocock, 1889)
- Tityus intermedius Borelli, 1899
- Tityus irapaensis González-Sponga, 2002
- Tityus isabelceciliae González-Sponga, D'Suze & Sevcik, 2001
- Tityus ivani González-Sponga, 2008
- Tityus ivicnancor González-Sponga, 1997
- Tityus jeanvellardi Lourenço, 2001
- Tityus julianae Lourenço, 2005
- Tityus juliorum Santiago-Blay, 2009
- Tityus jussarae Lourenço, 1988
- Tityus kaderkai Kovarik, 2005
- Tityus kalettai González-Sponga, 2007
- Tityus kukututee Ythier, Chevalier & Gangadin, 2020
- Tityus kuryi Lourenço, 1997
- Tityus lancinii González-Sponga, 1972
- Tityus lokiae Lourenço, 2005
- Tityus longidigitus González-Sponga, 2008
- Tityus lourencoi Flórez, 1996
- Tityus lutzi Giltay, 1928
- Tityus macrochirus Pocock, 1897
- Tityus magnimanus Pocock, 1897
- Tityus maimirensis González-Sponga, 2007
- Tityus manakai González-Sponga, 2004
- Tityus maniapurensis González-Sponga, 2009
- Tityus marajoensis Lourenço & da Silva, 2007
- Tityus maranhensis Lourenço, de Jesus Junior & Limeira-de-Oliveira, 2006
- Tityus martinpaechi Lourenço, 2001
- Tityus matthieseni Lourenço & Pinto-da-Rocha, 2000
- Tityus mattogrossensis Borelli, 1901
- Tityus maturinensis González-Sponga, 2008
- Tityus melanostictus Pocock, 1893
- Tityus melici Lourenço, 2003
- Tityus metuendus Pocock, 1897
- Tityus michelii Armas, 1982
- Tityus microcystis Lutz & Mello, 1922
- Tityus monaguensis González-Sponga, 1974
- Tityus mongei Lourenço, 1996
- Tityus mucusunamensis González-Sponga, 2006
- Tityus munozi Lourenço, 1997
- Tityus neblina Lourenço, 2008
- Tityus neglectus Mello-Leitão, 1932
- Tityus neibae Armas, 1999
- Tityus nelsoni Lourenço, 2005
- Tityus nematochirus Mello-Leitão, 1940
- Tityus neoespartanus González-Sponga, 1996
- Tityus nororientalis González-Sponga, 1996
- Tityus obispoi González-Sponga, 2006
- Tityus obscurus (Gervais, 1843)
- Tityus obtusus (Karsch, 1879)
- Tityus ocelote Francke & Stockwell, 1987
- Tityus osmanus González-Sponga, 1996
- Tityus oteroi Lourenço, 1998
- Tityus ottenwalderi Armas, 1999
- Tityus pachyurus Pocock, 1897
- Tityus pampanensis González-Sponga, 2007
- Tityus paraguayensis Kraepelin, 1895
- Tityus parvulus Kraepelin, 1914
- Tityus paulistorum Lourenço & Qi, 2006
- Tityus perijanensis González-Sponga, 1994
- Tityus pictus Pocock, 1893
- Tityus pintodarochai Lourenço, 2005
- Tityus pittieri González-Sponga, 1981
- Tityus pococki Hirst, 1907
- Tityus portoplatensis Armas & Marcano Fondeur, 1992
- Tityus potameis Lourenço & Leão Giupponi, 2004
- Tityus prancei Lourenço, 2000
- Tityus proseni Abalos, 1954
- Tityus pugilator Pocock, 1898
- Tityus pusillus Pocock, 1893
- Tityus quiriquirensis González-Sponga, 2008
- Tityus quirogae De Sousa, Manzanilla & Parrilla-Alvarez, 2006
- Tityus quisqueyanus (Armas, 1982)
- Tityus ramirezi Esquivel de Verde, 1969 [nomen dubium]
- Tityus raquelae Lourenço, 1988
- Tityus rebieri Lourenço, 1997
- Tityus riocaurensis González-Sponga, 1996
- Tityus rionegrensis Lourenço, 2006
- Tityus riverai Teruel & Sanchez, 2009
- Tityus roigi Maury & Lourenço, 1987
- Tityus rojasi González-Sponga, 1996
- Tityus romeroi González-Sponga, 2008
- Tityus rondonorum Rojas-Runjaic & Armas, 2007
- Tityus rufofuscus Pocock, 1897
- Tityus rugosus Schenkel, 1932
- Tityus rusmelyae González-Sponga, D'Suze & Sevcik, 2001
- Tityus sabinae Lourenço, 1994
- Tityus sanarensis González-Sponga, 1997
- Tityus sanfernandoi González-Sponga, 2008
- Tityus sarisarinamensis González-Sponga, 2002
- Tityus sastrei Lourenço & Flórez, 1990
- Tityus septentrionalis Armas & Abud Antun, 2004
- Tityus serrulatus Lutz & Mello, 1922
- Tityus shiriana González-Sponga, 1991
- Tityus silvestris Pocock, 1897
- Tityus simonsi Pocock, 1900
- Tityus smithii Pocock, 1893
- Tityus soratensis Kraepelin, 1912
- Tityus stigmurus (Thorell, 1876)
- Tityus strandi Werner, 1939
- Tityus surimeridensis González-Sponga, 2002
- Tityus surorientalis González-Sponga, 1996
- Tityus sylviae Lourenço, 2005
- Tityus tamayoi González-Sponga, 1987
- Tityus tayrona Lourenço, 1991
- Tityus tenuicauda Prendini, 2001
- Tityus timendus Pocock, 1898
- Tityus tocantim Lourenço, 2022
- Tityus trinitatis Pocock, 1897
- Tityus trivittatus Kraepelin, 1898
- Tityus tucurui Lourenço, 1988
- Tityus uniformis Mello-Leitão, 1931
- Tityus unus Lourenço & Pinto-da-Rocha, 2000
- Tityus uquirensis González-Sponga, 2001
- Tityus urachichensis González-Sponga, 2007
- Tityus urbinai Scorza, 1952
- Tityus uruguayensis Borelli, 1901
- Tityus vaissadei Lourenço, 2002
- Tityus valerae Scorza, 1954
- Tityus venamensis González-Sponga, 1981
- Tityus ventuarensis González-Sponga, 2009
- Tityus walli González-Sponga & Wall Gonzalez, 2007
- Tityus wayuu Rojas-Runjaic & Armas, 2007
- Tityus yerenai González-Sponga, 2009
- Tityus ythieri Lourenço, 2007
- Tityus zulianus González-Sponga, 1981

[?] Tityus thelyacanthus Mello-Leitão, 1933

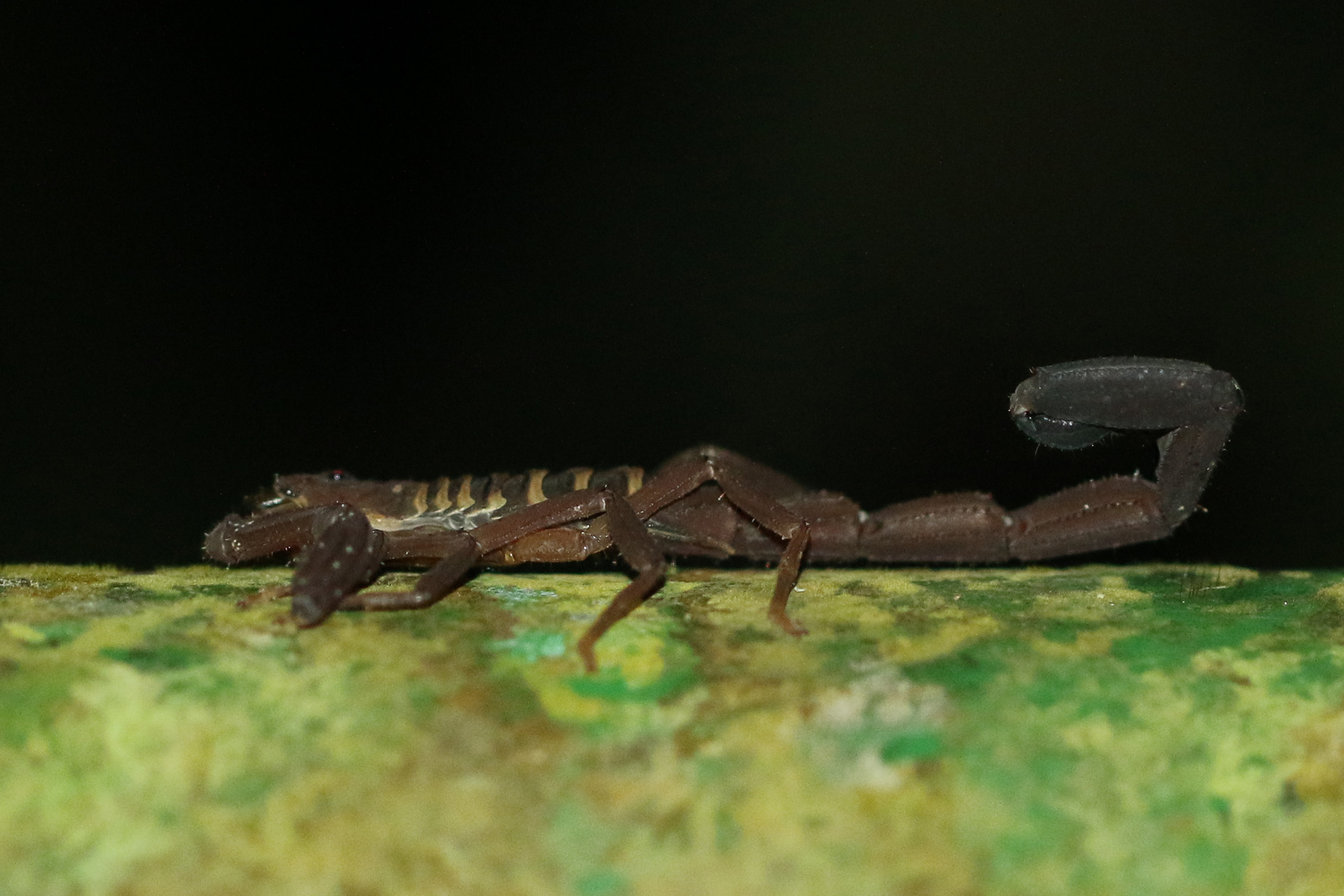
Tityus trinitatis Trinidad

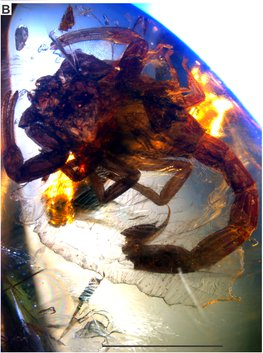
Tityus apozonalli in amber
