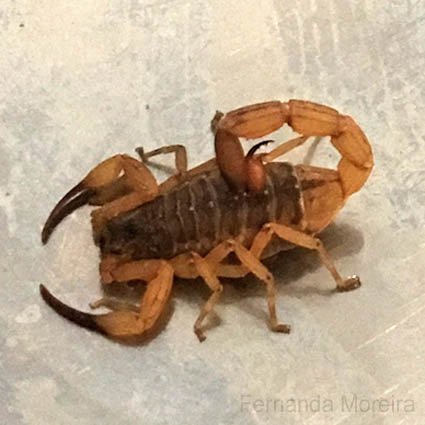

Scientific classification
- Kingdom: Animalia
- Phylum: Arthropoda
- Subphylum: Chelicerata
- Class: Arachnida
- Order: Scorpiones
- Family: Buthidae
- Genus: Tityus
- Species: T. serrulatus

Binomial name
- Tityus serrulatus Lutz & Mello, 1922

= Tityus serrulatus =

Species of scorpion

Tityus serrulatus, the Brazilian yellow scorpion, is a species of scorpion of the family Buthidae. It is native to Brazil, and its venom is extremely toxic. It is the most dangerous scorpion in South America and is responsible for the most fatal cases.

== Description ==
Adult specimens typically measure between 5–7 cm (2–3 in) in length. As suggested by its common name, coloration consists of pale-yellow legs (8 in total) and pedipalps, with a darker shade of yellowish brown on the trunk and tip of the legs, pedipalps and tail. Like other members of the family Buthidae, T. serrulatus has a bulbous tail, often carried in a characteristic forward curve over the back, which is segmented, with prominent ridges and serrations. The tail is tipped with a venom-injecting barb capable of immobilizing prey or delivering defensive strikes.

== Geographic range ==
The species is endemic to Brazil and widely found throughout the country, including the states of Alagoas, Bahia, Ceará, Espírito Santo, Goiás, Mato Grosso, Mato Grosso do Sul, Minas Gerais, Paraná, Pernambuco, Rio de Janeiro, Rio Grande do Norte, Rio Grande do Sul, Rondônia, Santa Catarina, São Paulo, Sergipe, and Distrito Federal.

"Due to deforestation and growing urbanization, this species is becoming more and more present," according to Rogério Bertani in an interview with the British newspaper The Guardian. He is a scientist and scorpion specialist at the Butantan Institute in São Paulo. "I personally think that the problem will continue to grow." By 2018 there was a notable increase in the number of T. serrulatus scorpions living in the urban spaces of São Paulo, contributing to an increase in reported scorpion stings in Brazil from 12,000 in 2000 to 140,000 by 2018. An abundance of prey, notably cockroaches, and shelter along with a lack of predators is believed to be a cause of the increase in scorpion numbers in Brazilian cities.

== Feeding ==
It has a diet of insects, such as cockroaches, and is suited to life in sewers and trash heaps in urban areas. Having a low metabolic rate, it can survive for months without eating.

== Reproduction ==
The species is usually parthenogenetic.

== Venom ==
=== Potency ===
In Brazil, scorpions are credited with causing the highest incidence of human envenomations of all venomous animals. They cause more than all other venomous animals, including snakes and spiders, combined. With mortality rates ranging from 1.0 to 2.0% among children and elderly persons, T. serrulatus is responsible for more medically significant accidents than any other scorpion in the country. Most stings occur in urban areas, inside or near homes, with greater frequency in the south and southeast during the warm and rainy months, but with little or no seasonal variability in the north, northeast, and center-west.

=== Effects ===
In mild cases, localized pain is the primary symptom. Tityus serrulatus venom contains TsIV, which slows the inactivation of sodium channels in muscles and nerve cells. Tityus serrulatus has an excitatory neurotoxin that attacks the autonomic nervous system, causing the release of adrenaline, noradrenaline and acetylcholine, causing an immense variety of symptoms in the victims; clinical effects may include hyperglycemia, fever, priapism, agitation, hypersalivation, tachycardia, hypertension, mydriasis, sweating, hyperthermia, tremors, gastrointestinal complications (diarrhea, abdominal pain, nausea, vomiting) and pancreatitis. Convulsions and coma are relatively rare, but can occur. Death usually results from pulmonary edema and cardiorespiratory failure. Deaths can occur between 1–6 hours, or 12–14 hours, depending on the age group, the person's state of health and the quantity of injected venom. The venom of this species seems to have different lethalities according to its distribution, T. serrulatus from Distrito Federal has an LD_{50} of 51.6 μg/kg, compared to LD_{50} from T. serrulatus from Minas Gerais, 26 μg/kg.

According to a nationwide epidemiological study of scorpion accidents that was conducted from 2000 to 2012, there were 482,616 accidents and 728 deaths reported in Brazil during that period. All of the fatal cases were attributed to the genus Tityus, and T. serrulatus, in particular, was believed to be responsible for the vast majority of scorpion-related deaths considered by the study.
