= List of plants poisonous to equines =

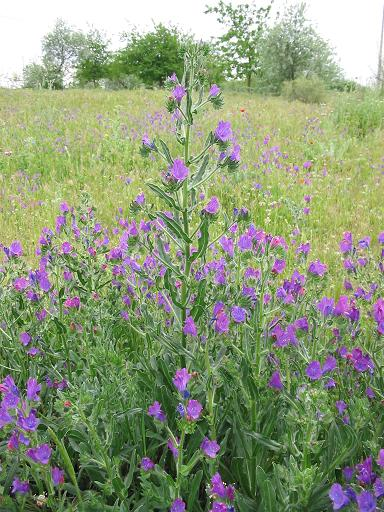
Paterson's Curse has been responsible for the deaths of many horses.

Many plants are poisonous to equines; the species vary depending on location, climate, and grazing conditions. In many cases, entire genera are poisonous to equines and include many species spread over several continents. Plants can cause reactions ranging from laminitis (found in horses bedded on shavings from black walnut trees), anemia, kidney disease and kidney failure (from eating the wilted leaves of red maples), to cyanide poisoning (from the ingestion of plant matter from members of the genus Prunus) and other tissue damage. Members of genus Prunus had been theorized to be at fault for mare reproductive loss syndrome, but the eastern tent caterpillar was later found to be the cause. Some plants, including yews, are deadly and extremely fast-acting. Several plants, including nightshade, become more toxic as they wilt and die, posing a danger to horses eating dried hay or plant matter blown into their pastures.

The risk of animals becoming ill during the fall is increased, as many plants slow their growth in preparation for winter, and equines begin to browse on the remaining plants. Many toxic plants are unpalatable, so animals avoid them where possible. However, this is not always the case; locoweeds, for example, are addictive and once a horse has eaten them, it will continue to eat them whenever possible, and can never be exposed to them again. When a toxic plant is ingested, it can be difficult to diagnose, because exposure over time can cause symptoms to occur after the animal is no longer exposed to the plant. Toxins are often metabolized before the symptoms become obvious, making it hard or impossible to test for them. Hungry or thirsty horses are more likely to eat poisonous plants, as are those pastured on overgrazed lands. Animals with mineral deficiencies due to poor diets will sometimes seek out poisonous plants. Poisonous plants are more of a danger to livestock after wildfires, as they often regrow more quickly.

== Poisonous plants ==
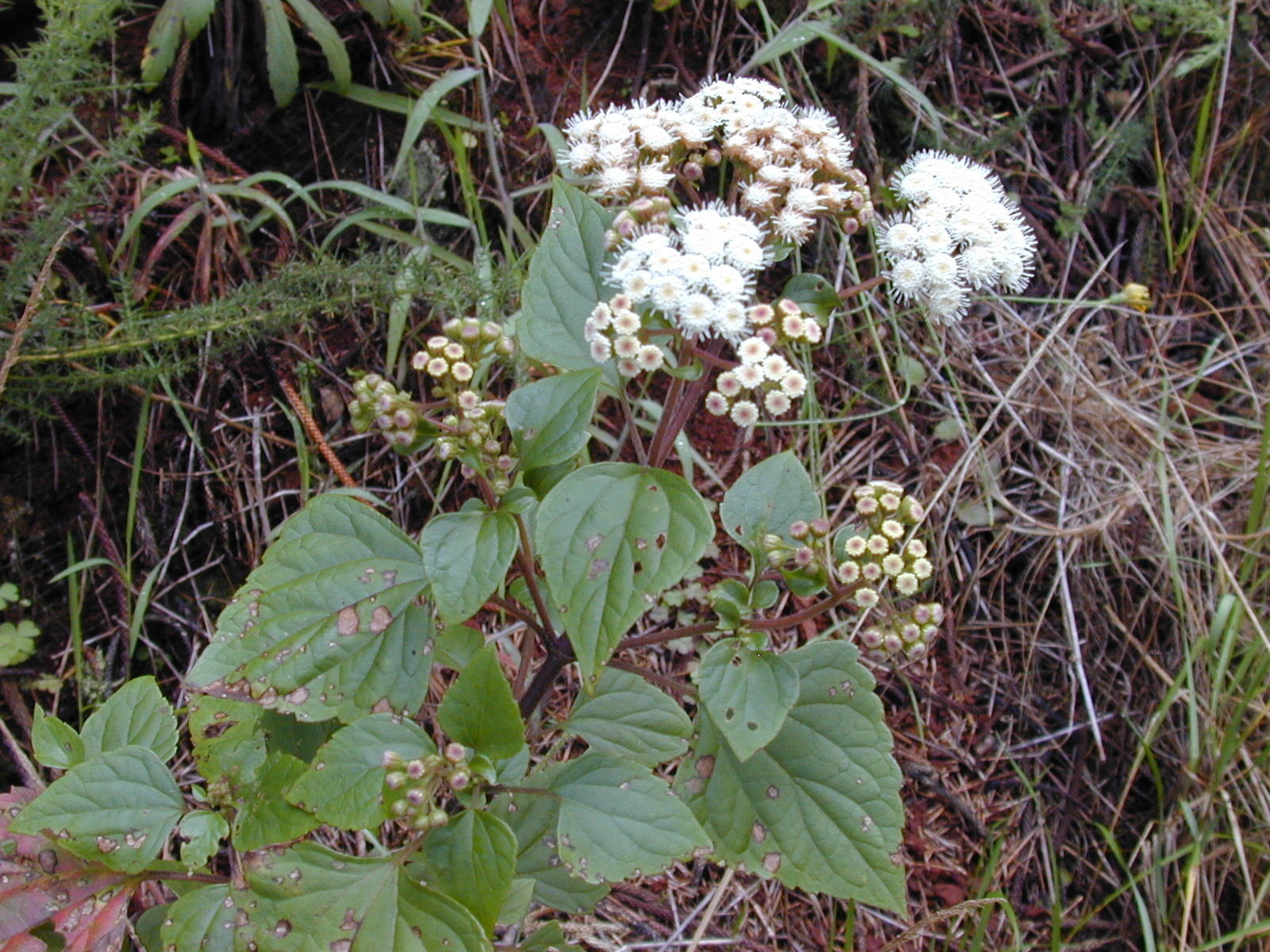
Crofton weed (Ageratina adenophora) (flowers and leaves)

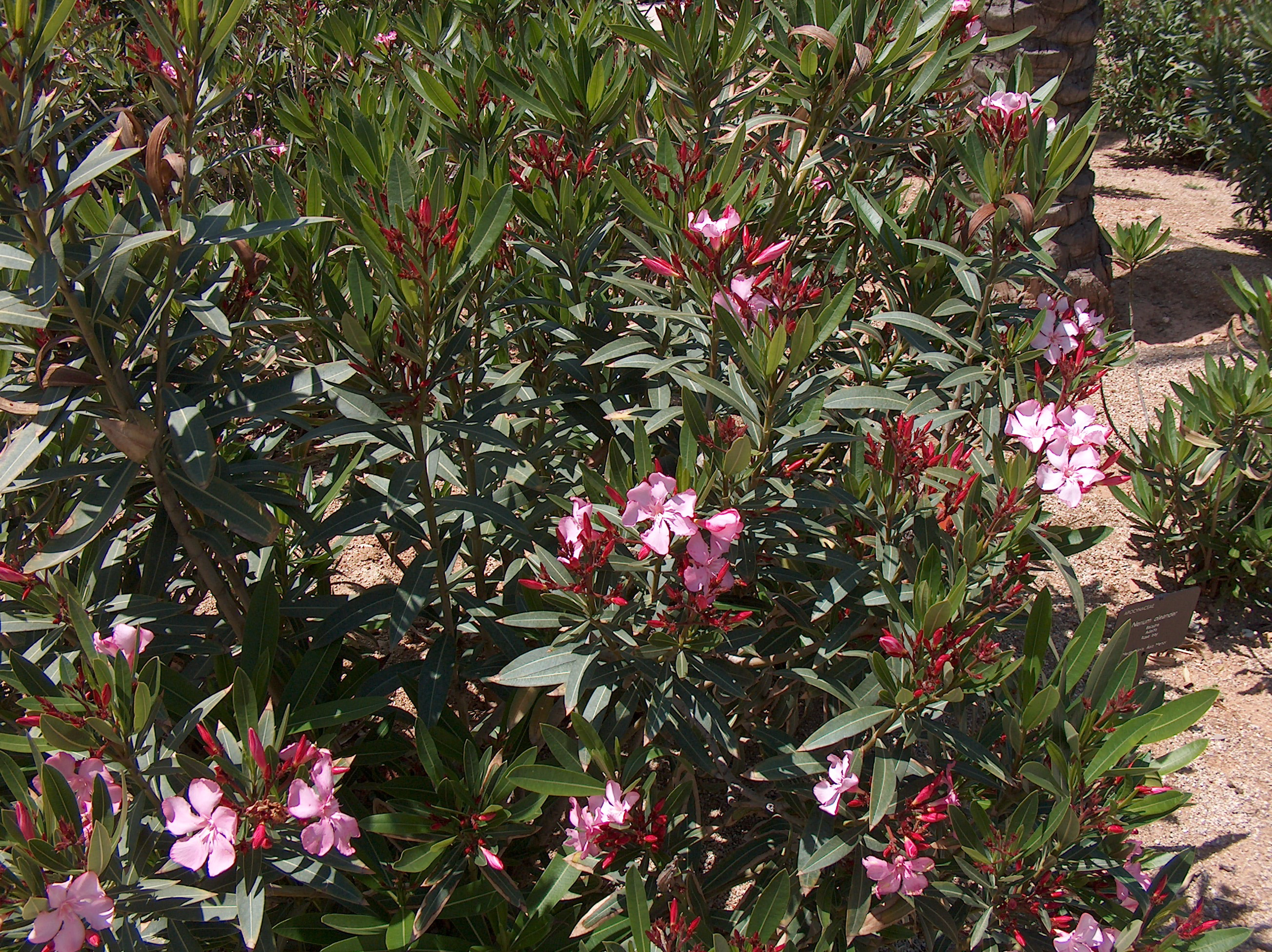
The deadly Nerium oleander

Scientific name	Common name	Notes	References
Abrus precatorius	Crab's eye	Also known as precatory bean, rosary pea, or jequirity bean	
Acer rubrum	Red maple, also known as swamp or soft maple	Toxic compounds are gallic acid and tannins.	
Adonis microcarpa	Pheasant's eye	Often found in hay.	
Aesculus hippocastanum	Horse chestnut	Also known as buckeye	
Ageratina	Snakeroots	Known poisonous species include Ageratina adenophora (Crofton weed, causes Tallebudgera horse disease) and Ageratina altissima (white snakeroot)	
Aleurites	Tung oil tree		
Amsinckia intermedia	Fiddleneck	Contains pyrrolizidine alkaloids	
Apocynum cannabinum	Hemp dogbane	Also known as Indian hemp, choctaw root, rheumatism weed, and snake's milk	
Arctotheca calendula	Cape weed		
Armoracia lapathifolia	Horseradish		
Artemisia		Known poisonous species include Artemisia tridentata (big sagebrush) and Artemisia filifolia (sand sagebrush)	
Asclepias syriaca	Common milkweed		
Astragalus	Locoweed, crazy weed, or milk vetch	Contains Swainsonine	
Atropa belladonna	Deadly nightshade or belladonna		
Baptisia	False indigo		
Berteroa incana	Hoary alyssum		
Brassica	Mustards		
Buxus sempervirens	Boxwood		
Celastrus scandens	Climbing bittersweet		
Centaurea	Star-thistles, knapweeds	Known poisonous species include Centaurea solstitialis (yellow star thistle or St. Barnaby's thistle) and Centaurea repens (Russian knapweed)	
Cestrum parqui	Green cestrum		
Chrysothamnus nauseosus	Rubber rabbitbrush		
Cicuta	Water hemlock, cowsbane		
Claviceps paspali	Paspalum ergot		
Conium maculatum	Hemlock or poison hemlock		
Corydalis	Fitweed, fumitory		
Craspedia chrysantha	Round billy button or woollyhead		
Crotalaria	Rattlepods		
Cucumis myriocarpus	Paddy melon		
Cuscuta	Dodder		
Cynoglossum officinale	Houndstongue		
Datura	Jimsonweed, thorn-apple		
Delphinium	Larkspur		
Dendrocnide moroides	Stinging tree or Gympie stinger		
Descurainia pinnata	Tansy mustard		
Digitalis	Foxgloves		
Dryopteris filix-mas	Male fern		
Duboisia	Corkwoods		
Echium plantagineum	Paterson's curse	Also known as Salvation Jane, blue weed and Lady Campbell weed	
Equisetum	Horsetails, mare's tails, scouring rush		
Erythrophleum chlorostachys	Cooktown ironwood		
Euphorbia	Spurges		
Festuca arundinacea	Tall fescue		
Franseria discolor	White ragweed		
Glechoma hederacea	Ground ivy	Also known as creeping charlie	
Grindelia	Gumweeds		
Haplopappus heterophyllus	Rayless goldenweed	Also known as jimmyweed or burrow weed	
Heliotropium	Heliotropes	Known poisonous species include Heliotropium amplexicaule (blue heliotrope), H. europaeum (common heliotrope), and H. supinum (creeping heliotrope)	
Homeria	Cape tulips		
Hypericum perforatum	St. John's wort	Also known as Klamath weed	
Hypochaeris radicata	Flatweed or catsear	Has been implicated in causing Australian stringhalt, possibly due to a toxic mold that grows on it, especially poisonous to draft horses	
Jacobaea	Ragworts		
Juglans nigra	Black walnut	Bedding horses in shavings or sawdust can cause laminitis	
Juniperus virginiana	Juniper		
Kalmia latifolia	Mountain laurel or spoonwood	Also known as spoonwood or calico bush	
Kochia scoparia	Burning bush	Also known as summer cypress or Mexican firewood	
Lantana camara	Yellow sage		
Ligustrum	Privets		
Lupinus	Lupins		
Lychee	Lychee	Ingesting large amounts almost certainly caused the death of four horses	
Malva parviflora	Mallow		
Marsilea drummondii	Nardoo	Contains an enzyme which destroys vitamin B_{1}, leading to brain damage in sheep and horses	
Melilotus	Sweetclover	Includes Melilotus alba (white sweetclover) and M. officinalis (yellow sweetclover), can be grazed as a forage crop, but mold or spoilage converts coumarins to toxic dicumarol, thus moldy hay or silage is dangerous	
Nerium oleander	Oleander	Also known as rose laurel, adelfa, or rosenlorbeer	
Nicotiana	Tobacco		
Onoclea sensibilis	Sensitive fern or meadow fern		
Oxytropis	Locoweed or crazy weed	Contains Swainsonine	
Persea americana	Avocado		
Physalis	Japanese lanterns, groundcherries		
Phytolacca americana	Pokeweed		
Prunus	Cherries, apricots, peaches, and plums		
Pteridium esculentum/P. aquilinum	Bracken fern		
Quercus	Oaks		
Ranunculus	Buttercups		
Raphanus raphanistrum	Wild radish		
Rhododendron	Azaleas, laurels, and rose bays		
Ricinus communis	Castor bean	Also known as palma Christi, fatal even in small amounts	
Robinia pseudoacacia	Black locust	Also known as false acacia	
Romulea		Known poisonous species include Romulea longifolia (Guildford grass) and R. rosea (onion grass or onion weed)	
Rudbeckia laciniata	Goldenglow, coneflower, or thimbleweed		
Senecio	Ragworts, groundsel, or stinking willy		
Silybum marianum	Variegated thistle	Poisons cattle, sheep, and rarely horses	
Solanum	Potatoes, tomatoes, nightshades, horse nettle, ground cherry, or Jerusalem cherry		
Solidago	Goldenrod		
Sorghum	Sudan grass, Johnson grass	Cyanide produced after stress	
Stachys arvensis	Field woundwort or stagger weed		
Stipa viridula	Sleepy grass		
Swainsona	Darling peas		
Taraxacum officinale	Dandelion	When infected with a toxic mold that grows on it, the plant has been linked to outbreaks of Australian stringhalt.	
Taxus	Yews		
Trifolium pratense	Red clover		
Vinca major	Blue periwinkle or large periwinkle		
Wislizenia refracta	Jackass clover		
Xanthium strumarium	Cocklebur		
Zephyranthes atamasca	Atamasco lily or rain lily		
