= Rood & Riddle Equine Hospital =

Veterinary hospital in Lexington, Kentucky

Coordinates: 38.0929°N 84.5109°W

- Type: Equine veterinarians
- Industry: Veterinary medicine; Thoroughbred horse racing; Equine sports
- Founded: 1986
- Headquarters: 2150 Georgetown Road; Lexington, Kentucky 40511
- Key people: William Rood; Thomas Riddle(founding partners)
- Divisions: Saratoga Springs, New York; Wellington, Florida
- Website: http://www.roodandriddle.com/

Rood & Riddle Equine Hospital was established in Lexington, Kentucky in 1986 as a partnership between veterinarians William Rood and Thomas Riddle. The facility offers a range of services for the treatment of horses. They have cared for many famous Thoroughbreds both at the racetrack and on the farm. They also provide support for other equine sporting events such as the 2010 FEI World Equestrian Games held in Lexington. Rood & Riddle operates branches in Saratoga Springs, New York and Wellington, Florida.

== Background ==
William ("Bill") Rood, DVM, is the Chief Executive Officer and President of Rood & Riddle. He graduated from the University of Louisville Equine Industry Program.

W. Thomas Riddle, DVM, whose father was also a veterinarian, grew up in South Carolina and graduated from the University of Georgia College of Veterinary Medicine in 1978. His specialty is reproductive veterinary medicine and he still frequently travels to the horse farms around Lexington. Riddle joined Rood's practice in 1981 and became a partner in 1984. They founded Rood & Riddle Equine Hospital in 1986.

Larry Bramlage, DVM, is another partner at Rood & Riddle, specializing in equine orthopedic surgery. "For many orthopedic injuries, when I first started doing surgery, it was somewhat of a last-ditch effort," he said in 2002. "Now orthopedic surgery has changed to where surgery is the first line of defense. Previously, the concern about doing surgery was that the surgery would do as much harm as the injury did."

Rood & Riddle has been called the "Mayo Clinic for horses" and is a full-service equine referral center. In a 2002 interview, Rood said the hospital treated about 10,000 cases each year, which included 4,600 surgeries and 1,293 arthroscopies. Their most common cases were colic and pneumonia. At that time, the hospital had 36 vets and 135 support staff. By 2013, the hospital had grown to a 24-acre facility with 50 vets and nine barns capable of holding 150 equine patients. The Lexington property includes surgical centers, a podiatry unit, a reproductive center, a colic intensive care unit, a neonatal unit and advanced diagnostic technology. In 2013, Rood & Riddle expanded to Saratoga Springs, New York after purchasing Saratoga Equine Veterinary Services. In 2016, they purchased a hospital facility in Wellington, Florida, a center of sport horse activities such as show jumping.

== Notable cases ==
In the spring of 2001, Riddle was the first to report on a number of cases of in utero foal deaths, referred to as mare reproductive loss syndrome (MRLS). Thousands of mares in central Kentucky were affected, resulting in an economic loss estimated to be as high $500 million. Rood & Riddle participated in a number of studies and helped determine that eastern tent caterpillars were responsible for the outbreak. By 2002, MRLS had decreased to only 30% of the previous year and was virtually eliminated by 2003.

Other notable cases include:

- In 2008, Chelokee suffered a catastrophic injury while racing that was surgically repaired by Bramlage by fusing the fetlock joint.
- Kip Deville was treated for colic in 2009 but then developed laminitis, leading to his death in 2010 after months of treatment at Rood & Riddle.
- In February 2013, Rachel Alexandra underwent a six-hour surgery performed by Dr. Brett Woodie at Rood & Riddle after she suffered a life-threatening colon injury during foaling.
- In 2014, Wise Dan, who was treated throughout his career by Bramlage for orthopedic conditions, underwent colic surgery at Rood & Riddle and was later able to return to racing.
- In October 2014, Cigar died at age 24 after being surgically treated for severe osteoarthritis in his neck.
- In March 2015, Groupie Doll delivered a premature colt, who was nursed back to health at Rood & Riddle.
- In April 2016, Zenyatta's four-day-old colt died after being treated at Rood & Riddle for meconium aspiration syndrome.

Although best known for their treatment of Thoroughbreds, Rood & Riddle is involved in all types of equine sports. They were named the Official Equine Hospital and Veterinary Partner for the 2010 FEI World Equestrian Games, and provided veterinary support at a series of test events starting in 2009. Since then, they have been associated with the annual Alltech National Horse Show in Lexington.
