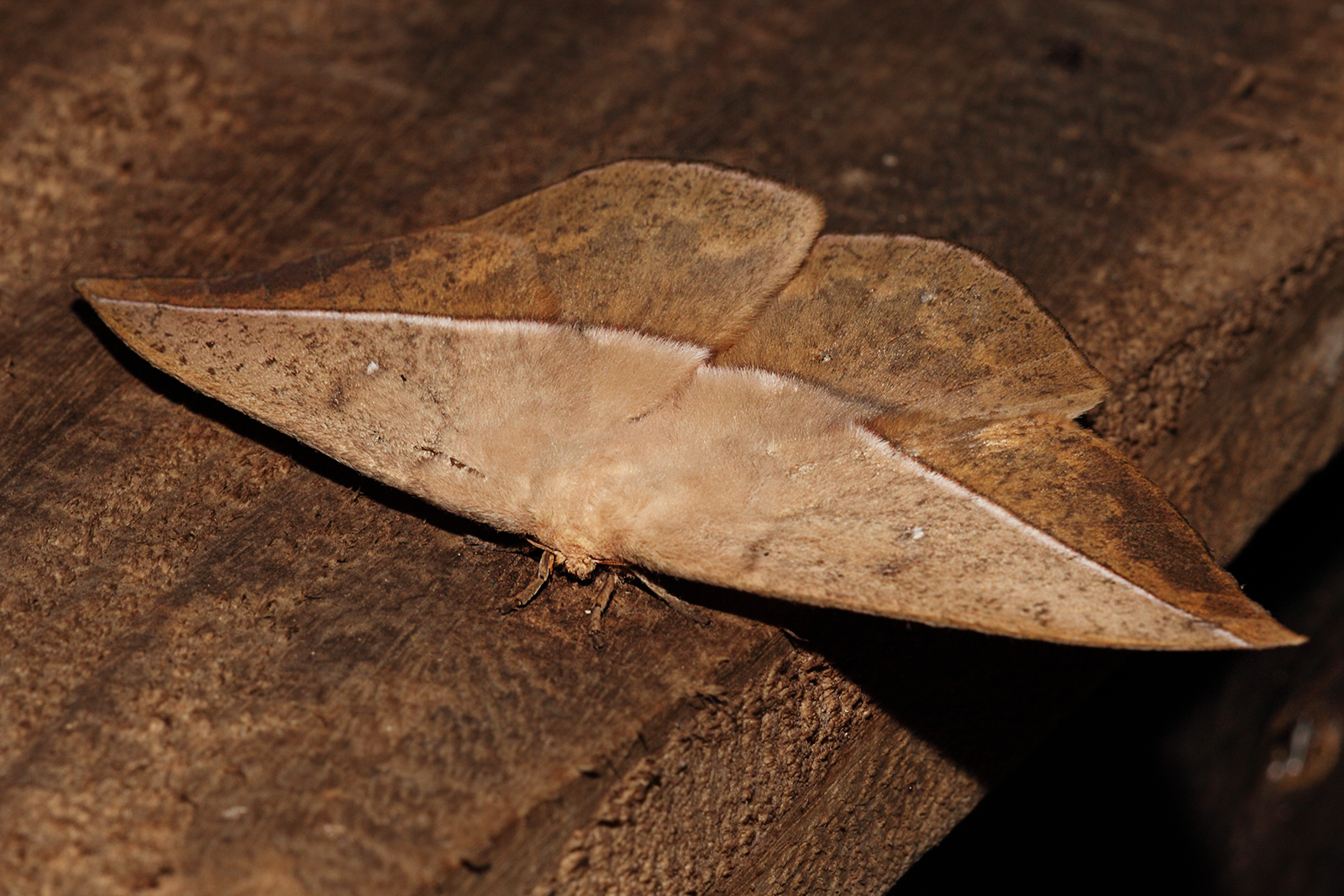

Scientific classification
- Kingdom: Animalia
- Phylum: Arthropoda
- Class: Insecta
- Order: Lepidoptera
- Family: Saturniidae
- Genus: Lonomia
- Species: L. camox

Binomial name
- Lonomia camox Lemaire, 1971

= Lonomia camox =

Species of moth

Lonomia camox is a species of saturniid moth that was discovered by Claude Lemaire in 1971.
