= Lonomia frankae =

Scientific classification
- Kingdom: Animalia
- Phylum: Arthropoda
- Class: Insecta
- Order: Lepidoptera
- Family: Saturniidae
- Genus: Lonomia
- Species: L. frankae

Binomial name
- Lonomia frankae Meister, Naumann, Brosch & Wenczel, 2005

Species of moth

Lonomia frankae is a species of saturniid moth. To date it has only been found in the vicinity of Oxapampa, Peru. Although it is not rare during April, it has only been caught in a single location, despite extensive sampling for a decade. Males do not fly until a short time before sunrise, which has likely contributed to its late discovery. The exact region, locally known as La Suiza, is separated from the thick forest of the Amazon basin by a ridge, and lies at an altitude of about 2,000 m.
