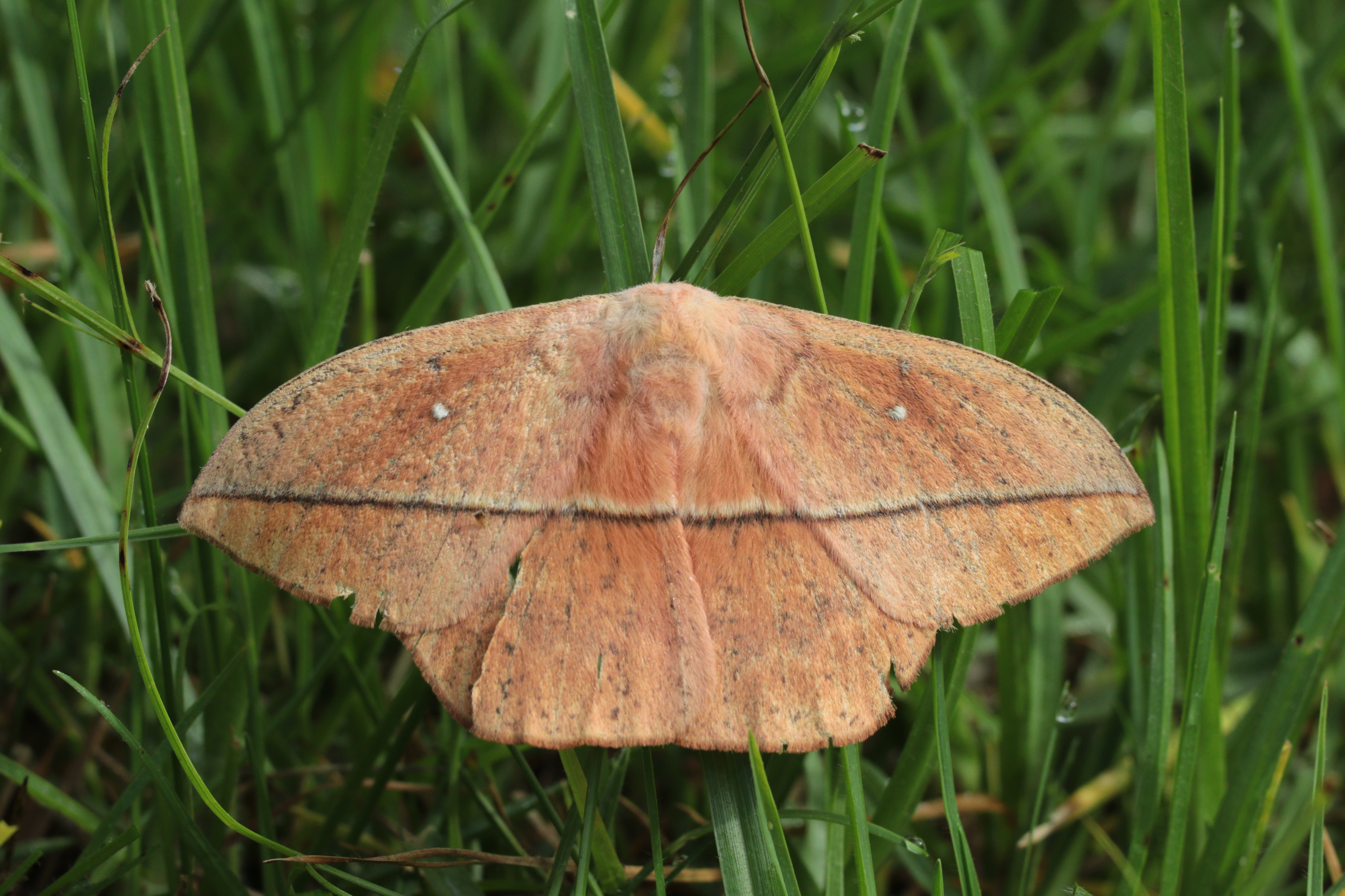
- L. electra Mount Totumas cloud forest, Panama
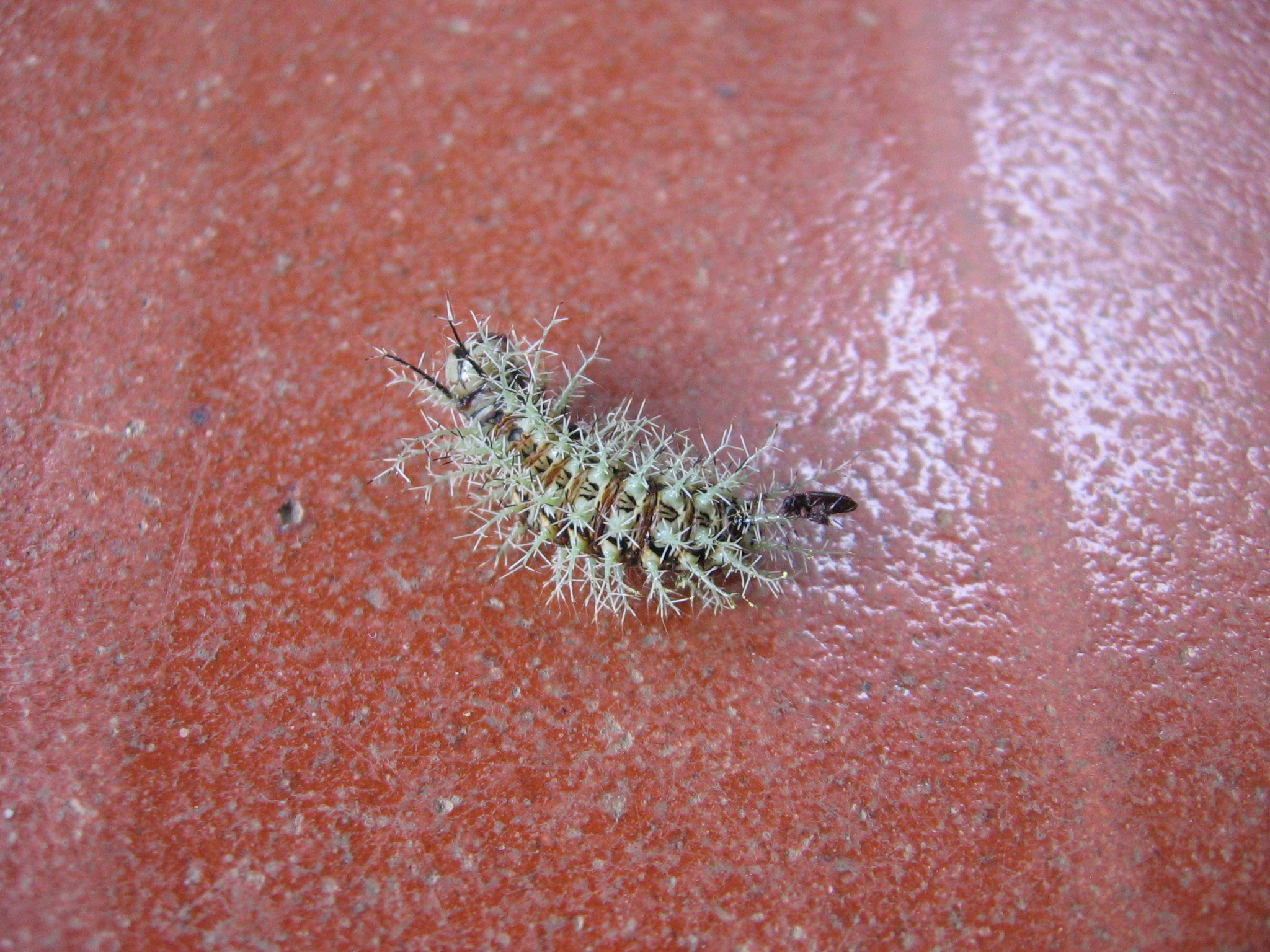
- Caterpillar of Lonomia obliqua

Scientific classification
- Kingdom: Animalia
- Phylum: Arthropoda
- Clade: Pancrustacea
- Class: Insecta
- Order: Lepidoptera
- Family: Saturniidae
- Subfamily: Hemileucinae
- Genus: Lonomia; Walker, 1855

Species
- See text

Diversity
- 14 species

= Lonomia =

Genus of insects

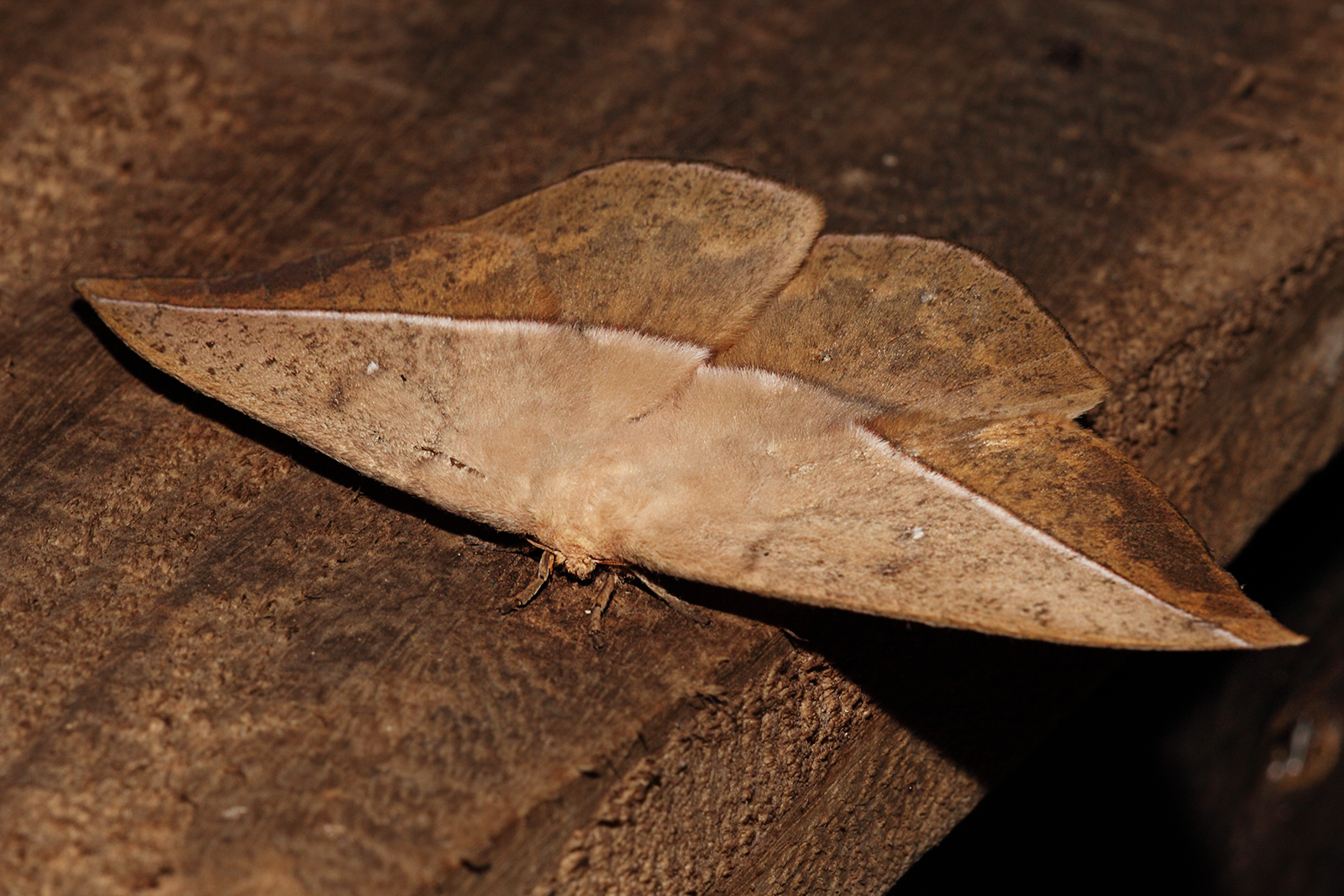
Lonomia sp.

The genus Lonomia is a moderate-sized group of fairly cryptic saturniid moths from South America, famous not for the adults, but for their highly venomous caterpillars, which are responsible for a few deaths each year, especially in southern Brazil, and the subject of hundreds of published medical studies. They are commonly known as giant silkworm moth, a name also used for a wide range of other saturniid moths.

== Description ==
The caterpillars are themselves extremely cryptic, blending in against the bark of trees, where the larvae commonly aggregate. The larvae, like most hemileucines, are covered with urticating hairs, but these caterpillars possess a uniquely potent anticoagulant venom.

== Toxicity ==
A typical envenomation incident involves a person unknowingly leaning against, placing their hand on, or rubbing their arm against a group of these caterpillars that are gathered on the trunk of a tree. The effects of a dose from multiple caterpillars can be dramatic and severe, including massive internal hemorrhaging, kidney failure, and hemolysis. The resulting medical syndrome is sometimes called lonomiasis. Death may result, either rapidly or after many days following envenomation.

The LD_{50} of the Lonomia venom is 0.19 mg for an 18–20 g mouse (IV); however, due to the small amount of venom in the bristles of the caterpillar, the rate of human fatality is only 1.7%.

While there are more than a dozen species in the genus, the most troublesome species is Lonomia obliqua, and it is this species on which most of the medical research has centered. As anticoagulants have some very beneficial applications (e.g., prevention of life-threatening blood clots) the research is motivated by the possibility of deriving some pharmaceutically valuable chemicals from the toxin.

== Species ==
- Lonomia achelous (Cramer, 1777) — Bolivia, Venezuela, Colombia, Ecuador, French Guiana, Brazil, Peru, Suriname
- Lonomia beneluzi Lemaire, 2002 — French Guiana
- Lonomia camox Lemaire, 1972 — Venezuela, French Guiana, Suriname
- Lonomia columbiana Lemaire, 1972 — Costa Rica, Panama, Colombia
- Lonomia descimoni Lemaire, 1972 — Bolivia, Colombia, Ecuador, French Guiana, Peru, Suriname, Brazil
- Lonomia diabolus Draudt, 1929 — Brazil, French Guiana
- Lonomia electra Druce, 1886 — Central America up to Mexico
- Lonomia francescae L. Racheli, 2005 — Ecuador
- Lonomia frankae Meister, Naumann, Brosch & Wenczel, 2005 — Peru
- Lonomia obliqua Walker, 1855 — Argentina, Brazil, Uruguay
- Lonomia pseudobliqua Lemaire, 1973 — Bolivia, Colombia, Ecuador, Venezuela, Peru
- Lonomia rufescens Lemaire, 1972 — Nicaragua to Panama, Colombia, Peru
- Lonomia serranoi Lemaire, 2002 — El Salvador
- Lonomia venezuelensis Lemaire, 1972 — Venezuela
