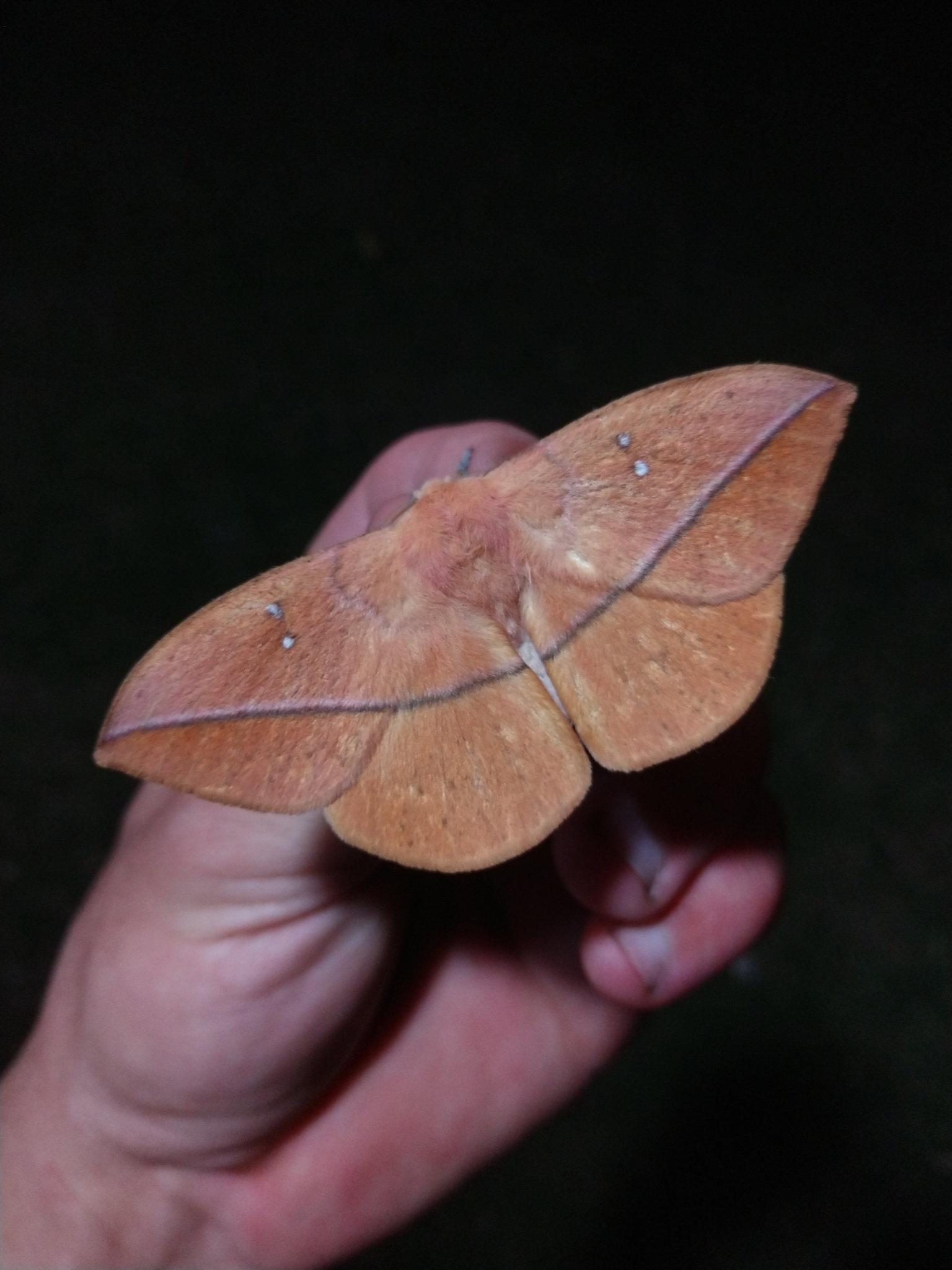
- Adult

Scientific classification
- Kingdom: Animalia
- Phylum: Arthropoda
- Clade: Pancrustacea
- Class: Insecta
- Order: Lepidoptera
- Family: Saturniidae
- Genus: Lonomia
- Species: L. obliqua

Binomial name
- Lonomia obliqua Walker, 1855

= Lonomia obliqua =

Species of moth

Lonomia obliqua is a species of saturniid moth ("giant silk moth") from South America. It is famous for its larval form, rather than the adult moth, primarily because of the caterpillar's defense mechanism, urticating bristles that inject a potentially deadly venom. The caterpillar has been responsible for many human deaths, especially in southern Brazil. Its venom has been the subject of numerous medical studies. The species was first described by Francis Walker in 1855. Guinness World Records classified Lonomia obliqua as the most venomous caterpillar in the world.

== Description ==
These caterpillars are about 4.1 to 6.7 centimeters (about 2 in) long, with background colors ranging from green to brown. Well camouflaged, they have rows of tubercles crowned with whorls of easily detachable spines of different sizes.

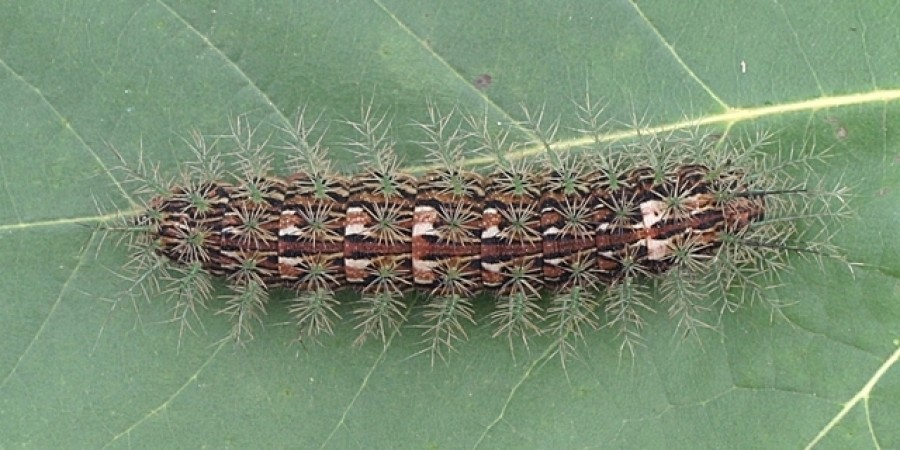
Larva

== Discovery ==
Caterpillars of many species can cause irritation by their hollow body hairs that envenom or detach easily, or can be poisonous if ingested. Prior to investigations into Lonomia caterpillars, it was not known that caterpillars could produce toxins in sufficient quantities to kill a human. Lonomia obliqua is found in the south of Brazil in the states of Rio Grande do Sul, Santa Catarina, and Paraná. The species appears to be spreading to the southeast of Brazil, and recent accidents with the species were reported in the states of São Paulo, Rio de Janeiro, and Minas Gerais. L. obliqua is also found in Uruguay, Paraguay, and Argentina.

The species became internationally known when an epidemic occurred in an agrarian community in Rio Grande do Sul. Hematoma and gangrene-like symptoms manifested, spreading throughout the body, eventually causing massive blood leakage into the brain and, in several cases, death. At first the cause could not be determined, although each victim stated they had "just handled a bunch of leafy branches to break the trail or gather vegetation." Exploring the area, the only creature commonly found within all the incidents was the L. obliqua caterpillar. Its hair growth covers its body, and each clump of spines is able to easily puncture the skin and release toxins into the victim.

== Toxicity ==
Lonomia obliqua has a toxic venom which causes disseminated intravascular coagulation and a consumptive coagulopathy, which can lead to a hemorrhagic syndrome. The toxins are stored in sacs at the base of each spine. As the spines penetrate the victim, venom flows through the hollow bristles and into the puncture wound.

It was discovered that the toxin in the caterpillar's skin held potent anti-clotting agents. This anti-clotting agent would attach to another protein of the body's cells and cause them to leak as blood is unable to clot. This internal bleeding would fill the surrounding tissue with "bruised blood". This internal bleeding spreads through the internal organs and eventually leads to compression and brain death. This accounts for the minimum of 500 deaths resulting from contact with L. obliqua caterpillars.

Of the 26 species of the genus Lonomia found on the American continent, only Lonomia obliqua and Lonomia achelous have caused severe reactions, leading to hemorrhagic syndrome. Since 1989 the number of human accidents caused by these caterpillars has been increasing in the southern region of Brazil. Most victims were male (63%), many were between 0 and 21 years old (45%), and lesions are especially common on the fingers (41%). The reported death rate is 2.5%.

In a 2021 study, caterpillar accidents in Brazil attributed to Lonomia obliqua between 2007 and 2017 amounted to 42,264 recorded cases. Of the 248 cases considered severe, five resulted in death. While such incidents are not common, a São Paulo-based vaccine company has begun producing antivenom.

During the venom extraction, after removal of all spicules, each caterpillar produces approximately 2.4 mg of venom; the total amount of venom injected in an individual weighing 70 kg can reach up to 1.4–1.7 mg/kg.

== Effects of venom ==
Disseminated intravascular coagulation occurs as the toxin interacts with the victim's body. One serious effect on envenomed victims is hemorrhage syndrome. "First described by Arocha-Pinango and Layrisse in Venezuela in 1967, the hemorrhagic diathesis caused in humans by touching the Lonomia species begins with inflammatory changes at the site of envenoming, followed by systemic symptoms such as headache, fever, vomiting, and malaise. After 24 hours, a severe bleeding disorder ensues, leading to ecchymosis, hematuria, pulmonary, and intracranial hemorrhages, and acute kidney injury."

== Case studies ==
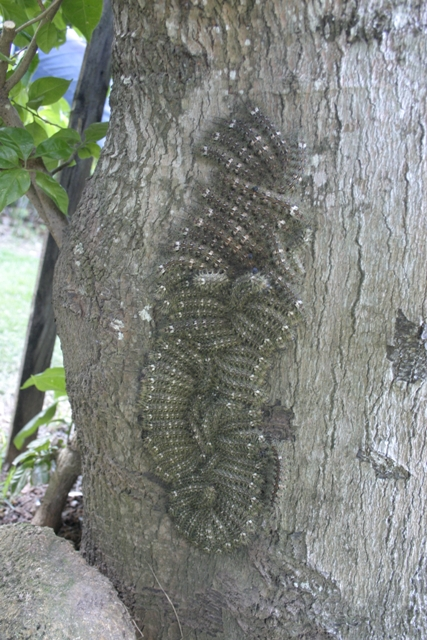
Gregarious L. obliqua caterpillars clustered on a tree trunk. Contact with multiple caterpillars can result in more significant envenomation, and more serious health effects.

Although few cases are recorded, a case study of a fatal encounter was published in Arquivos de Neuro-Psiquiatria: "A 70-year-old, previously healthy woman developed a sudden coma. Four days before, she had started to present hematuria. Shortly after admission, her coma was rated as Glasgow 3. Physical examination revealed several skin hemorrhages, and gross hematuria was present. Based on information in a note left by the patient, two small hyperemic lesions were identified on the tip of her left toe. Along with the note was the green caterpillar which was hidden inside of her slipper. CT-scan imaging revealed multiple intracerebral hemorrhages. She died seven days after being envenomed."

In another case, internal bleeding spread throughout the lower body. While this victim did not die, prompt medical attention was necessary.

== Treatment ==
While there are many reported cases of serious injuries and fatalities, there are not many records of proper treatment should an individual be stung. According to Dr. Robert Norris, stings and abrasions caused by Lonomia obliqua should be treated with antifibrinolytics. If blood products are required, they must be given cautiously to avoid fueling the constant consumptive coagulopathy. An antiserum is produced by the Butantan Institute in São Paulo, Brazil. It effectively reverses the coagulation disorders induced by Lonomia obliqua venom, and patients treated with this antiserum recover rapidly.

== Medical applications ==
L. obliqua caterpillar toxin has been the subject of numerous studies to determine its medical value. In particular the component called "Lopap" (L. obliqua prothrombin activator protease) has exhibited anticoagulant and anti-apoptotic qualities.
