= Mare reproductive loss syndrome =

Ailment in horses

Mare reproductive loss syndrome (MRLS) is a syndrome consisting of equine abortions and three related nonreproductive syndromes which occur in horses of all breeds, sexes, and ages. MRLS was first observed in the U.S. state of Kentucky in a three-week period around May 5, 2001, when about 20–30% of Kentucky's pregnant mares suffered abortions. A primary infectious cause was rapidly ruled out, and the search began for a candidate toxin. No abortifacient toxins were identified.

In the spring of 2001, Kentucky had experienced an extraordinarily heavy infestation of eastern tent caterpillars (ETCs). An epidemiological study showed ETCs to be associated with MRLS. When ETCs returned to Kentucky in the spring of 2002, equine exposure to caterpillars was immediately shown to produce abortions. Research then focused on how the ETCs produced the abortions. Reviewing the speed with which ETCs produced late-term abortions in 2002 experiments, the nonspecific bacterial infections in the placenta/fetus were assigned a primary driving role. The question then became how exposure to the caterpillars produced these non-specific bacterial infections of the affected placenta/fetus and also the uveitis and pericarditis cases.

Reviewing the barbed nature of ETC hairs (setae), intestinal blood vessel penetration by barbed setal fragments was shown to introduce barbed setal fragments and associated bacterial contaminants into intestinal collecting blood vessels (septic penetrating setae). Distribution of these materials following cardiac output would deliver these materials to all tissues in the body (septic penetrating setal emboli). About 15% of cardiac output goes to the late-term fetus, at which point the septic barbed setal fragments are positioned to penetrate placental tissues which lack an immune response. Bacterial proliferation, therefore, proceeds unchecked and the late-term fetus is rapidly aborted.

Similar events occur with the early-term fetus, but as a much smaller target receiving an equivalently smaller fraction of cardiac output, the early-term fetus is less likely to be "hit" by a randomly distributing setal fragment. Since this MRLS pathogenesis model was first proposed in 2002, other caterpillar-related abortion syndromes have been recognized, most notably equine amnionitis and fetal loss in Australia, and more recently, a long-recognized relationship between pregnant camels eating caterpillars and abortions among the camel pastoralists in the western Sahara.

== History ==
What became MRLS was first noted on April 26, 2001, by Dr. Thomas Riddle of Lexington, Kentucky, who observed an unusual number of equine in utero early fetal deaths in 60-day-old fetuses he was examining by ultrasound for sex determination. These early fetal losses were soon followed by a sequence of numerous early and late fetal losses and, recognized somewhat later, coincident and relatively small numbers of pericarditis, unilateral uveitis, and encephalitis syndromes occurring in horses of all ages and sexes.

The fetal loss numbers were large. During the three weeks around the first of May 2001, about 20–30% of Kentucky's pregnant mares suffered abortions. Of foals conceived in the spring of 2001, about 2000 were lost, the so-called early fetal losses (EFLs). Of foals conceived during the spring of 2000, and then close to term, at least 600 were lost, the so-called late fetal losses (LFLs). Based on these overwhelming reproductive losses, the syndrome was named the mare reproductive loss syndrome (MRLS).

MRLS was defined as including four syndromes: (1) EFLs, (2) LFLs, (3) unique unilateral uveitis, and (4) pericarditis syndrome. An associated encephalitis syndrome was not included in the original case definition. The unusual pericarditis cases and the unique single-eye uveitis cases were observed in horses of all ages, breeds, and sexes, were independent of any state of pregnancy, and that they occurred at the same time as the early and late fetal loss syndromes. From the first, therefore, MRLS was clearly not simply a pregnancy-related syndrome.

The total economic loss to Kentucky and the racing industry for the 2001 MRLS season has been estimated at $336–500 million.

Coincident with the MRLS syndrome in May 2001, Kentucky was experiencing an extraordinarily heavy infestation of eastern tent caterpillars (ETCs). As part of an extensive and multifaceted investigation spearheaded by the University of Kentucky, a rigorous epidemiological survey by Dr. Roberta Dwyer and her associates soon confirmed an association of MRLS with the presence of the caterpillar. Yet to come, however, was scientific proof that the caterpillars were the cause of MRLS, and the proposed mechanism by which they affected horses.

== Clinical signs ==
MRLS was initially characterized by four syndromes: (1) EFLs, (2) LFLs and the nonreproductive syndromes, (3) unilateral uveitis, (4) pericarditis, and later (5) Actinobacillus encephalitis. MRLS was observed in mares of all breeds and ages. Early and late fetal losses were observed within the first and last trimesters of pregnancy, respectively. For EFLs, clinical signs from the sick mares included pus-like discharge from the vulva and fetal membranes protruding from the vulva, as the fetuses were located in either the vagina or vulva. One to three days prior to the EFLs, several mares showed mild colic symptoms, abdominal straining, or low-grade fever. Within a week of abortion, inspections indicated moderate to severe inflammation within the uterine region. Performing ultrasounds revealed either dead fetuses or live fetuses with slow heart rates and lethargic movements. All the fetuses, both alive and dead, were surrounded by cloudy amniotic fluid.

Clinical signs for LFLs included explosive parturition, dystocia, foaling while standing, premature placenta separation, and foals either stillborn or born weak. Placentas were observed to carry a pale brown hue as opposed to their usual dark reddish-brown color. The umbilical cords were thick, dull, yellowish, and inflamed. The weak foals were often incapable of breathing on their own and required resuscitation. These foals were also observed to be dehydrated and hypothermic, with irregular heartbeat and respiration. The majority of these foals did not survive past four days.

One finding observed exclusively in MRLS was unilateral uveitis; initially, affected horses expressed inflammation around a single eye, along with fluid accumulation on the corneas, anterior and posterior chambers due to the inflammation. The fluid in the anterior chambers exhibited tan to yellow hues, and often was accompanied by hemorrhaging around the surface of the iris.

== Cause ==
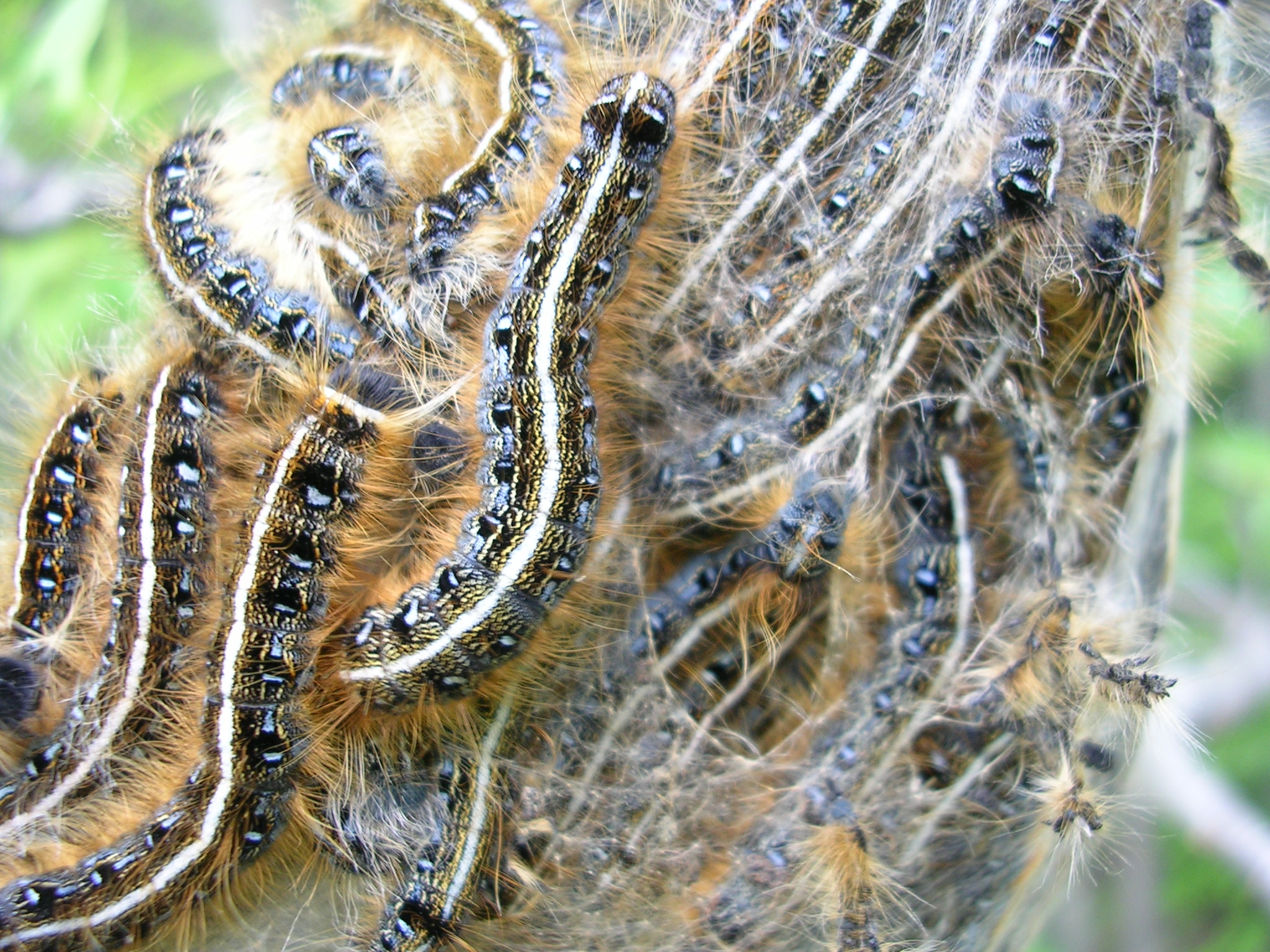
Eastern tent caterpillars

The eastern tent caterpillar infestation in the spring of 2001 was extraordinary. It was not uncommon to observe more than a dozen caterpillars per square foot of lawn or pasture. One photograph shows a water bucket completely engulfed with ETCs. The pasture presence of ETCs was thought to be related to the MRLS abortions, leading to ETC epidemiological studies. ETC eggs are preferentially laid in webs on black cherry trees, and the primary food for ETCs is black cherry tree leaves.

By June 2001, Kentucky ETCs were no longer available for research, and would not reappear until the following April/May. MRLS research in the interim focused on the possible role of black cherry tree-related cyanide as the proximal cause of MRLS. The leaves of black cherry trees are known to be toxic due to their production of cyanide. Cyanide conveyed to mares via the caterpillars was initially thought to be the causative agent. Administration of both cyanide and mandelonitrile (a cyanide-containing chemical in cherry leaves) to horses demonstrated cyanide does not cause MRLS.

When the caterpillars returned to central Kentucky in late April 2002, they were readily shown to cause both the early and late fetal losses.

In 2002, investigators' attention was drawn to the highly toxic Brazilian Lonomia obliqua caterpillar setae and their enzymatic fibrinolysin toxin. A caterpillar defense mechanism based on specific setal toxins made more biological sense than a defense based on intestinal cyanide content. More importantly, if the ETC abortions were due to an enzyme or toxin, it should be possible to vaccinate horses against the toxin, an approach already explored with reference to the Lonomia toxin. In June 2002, conception of this ETC enzymatic setal toxin hypothesis was recorded as an intellectual property (IP) disclosure with the University of Kentucky IP office in which creation of an anti-ETC abortifacient toxin vaccine was proposed.

Following these initiatives, when ETCs again became available in 2002, a number of experiments on pregnant mice seeking to evaluate the use of pregnant mice as a laboratory model of MRLS and to develop experimental support for a filterable protein ETC toxin. These experiments showed intact ETC setae appeared to cause fetal resorption in mice, but frozen ETC setae and ETC setal filtrates failed to produce fetal resorptions in mice.

== Mechanism of action ==
The septic penetrating setal emboli (SPSE) hypothesis is the most probable mechanism of action for ETC exposure leading to MRLS. SPSE is believed to be a completely novel hypothesis, without precedent in biology or medicine.

Reviewing the speed with which ETC dosing produced LFLs in controlled experiments and the barbed nature of ETC hairs (setae), and thereafter) intestinal blood vessel penetration by barbed ETC setal fragments, followed by their systemic distribution following cardiac output (SPSE) and then distant tissue penetration by these distributed fragments to tissues with reduced immune responses, i.e., the early- and late-term fetus, the eye, and the heart/pericardial space/fluid, followed by bacterial proliferation in the reduced immune response tissue (fetus, eye, pericardial fluid) would both quantitatively account for and mechanistically link all four MRLS syndromes, including most particularly the unique and unprecedented single-eye lesions.

In this probabilistic model, the number of actual distributing setal fragments is assumed to be small, on the order of tens per day, but the probability of a clinically observed adverse event in a poorly immune-protected tissue penetrated by a setal fragment was assumed to be close to 1.0, leading to the numerous EFL and LFL events and the rare but essentially unique single-eye events of MRLS. A poor immune response in affected tissues is an integral part of the SPSE hypothesis. ETC setal fragments distributing bacteria to immune competent tissues, as occurred in all horses in central Kentucky during the ETC/MRLS do not appear to produce any observable clinical responses. However, the fetus is well known to be poorly immune protected, as is the eye, and extracellular tissue fluids such as the pericardial fluid are also less well immune protected, i.e., the four tissues in which clinical lesions of MRLS were observed.

The pericardial and single-eye events, occurring at the same time as the reproductive loss events, but in horses of all ages and sexes, meant the MRLS factor "went through" essentially all central Kentucky horses at the time of the MRLS reproductive events. However, only in pregnant mares were the most numerous, dramatic and commercially significant events observed.

The probability of an MRLS event is, all other things being equal, directly related to the proportion of cardiac output delivered to the tissue in question. This accounts for the very rapid (36-hr) onset of the high-dose LFL events, the much slower rate of onset of EFL events, due to the much smaller size and correspondingly smaller portion of cardiac output going to the early term fetus. The proportion of cardiac output going to a single eye is clearly very small, accounting for the very small incidence (estimated at one per 60,000 equine eyes in central Kentucky) of the unique single-eye events. In fact, based on the incidence of single-eye events, estimates of the actual number of circulating setal fragments on the order of ten per day, the small number of which accounts for the lack of clinical signs in ETC MRLS horses and the difficulty in culturing bacteria from the bloodstream of MRLS mares.

The pathogenesis of MRLS was found to depend simply on the mechanical properties of the barbed setal fragments and their ability to transport bacterial pathogens through the cardiovascular system and distribute them by tissue penetration to poorly immune-protected tissues such as the early and late fetus, the eye, and the pericardial fluid. As such, setal fragment penetration could well be an ancient defense mechanism of caterpillars, and given that possibility, MRLS-like syndromes might well be found in association with other caterpillar species.

This proposed pathogenesis, SPSE hypothesis of MRLS, was communicated privately among colleagues and university administrators, and then publicly at the Bain Fallon lectures, the Gold Coast, Australia, July 2002, and the following month to participants the First International Symposium on the Mare Reproductive Loss Syndrome.

In 2003 (Memorial Day Weekend), compelling statistical evidence in support of this probabilistic mechanism developed when a combined analysis of 2012 and 2013 LFL abortion rate data showed their time courses closely followed a probabilistic mathematical equation called accelerated failure time model (AFT). This AFT analysis was immediately written up as a toxicokinetic analysis of MRLS, shared in draft form with colleagues prior to submission for publication, and the full SPSE hypothesis was next written up and published immediately thereafter.

At about this time during the fall of 2003, colleagues who had been provided the prepublication draft of the AFT analysis paper were performing necropsies on pigs that had been dosed with ETCs. They noted the intestinal tracts of these pigs showed large numbers of intestinal microgranulomas, each encasing an ETC setal fragment. Discussing rumors of these findings with Dr. Terry Fitzgerald, he noted that similar intestinal microgranulomas had been observed previously in ETC-dosed rats by colleagues experimenting with ETCs, and he shared some H and E section of such a rat intestinal ETC setal microgranuloma slides for inclusion in a second paper.

The SPSE hypothesis included intestinal penetration and presumably lethal peritonitis as one logical outcome of intestinal exposure to ETC septic penetrating setal fragments. One may reasonably assume that all living possessors of intestinal tracts have an evolutionarily well-developed and effective defense to intestinal exposure to insult such as ETC setal fragments and/or equivalent structures. The completely consistent and logical nature of the defense mechanism, namely encapsulation of the penetrating fragment in connective tissue so that the tissue movements driving fragment movement are effectively minimized and peristalsis-driven migration of the fragment is thereby prevented.

The AFT model, while first developed to describe mechanical failure, has been applied frequently to biological and medical situations. In most toxicological models, the effect is proportional to concentration of toxin or amount of insult. However, in the AFT model, both effect (abortion) and the time to effect are dependent on concentration. This statistical model fit MRLS data which showed abortions occurred rapidly and in higher frequencies at high doses of ETCs, and the onset of abortions was delayed and abortions occurred with lower frequency at low doses.

A simple intuitive model of AFT analysis is to imagine what happens when a person armed with a machine gun appears at the door of a crowded ballroom and shoots randomly into the room. Sooner or later, everybody in the ballroom will be killed. However, if the shooter just happens to be shooting very slowly, then the time to the first death will be relatively longer and the frequency of hits is low, which is of course the longer "lag time period" and low frequency one sees with MRLS in a normal year when the caterpillars are rare (or an experimental dose of caterpillars is small). However, if the shooter is shooting very fast, then the time to first death is very short and frequency of death is high, equivalent to the very short time to first abortions and high frequency of abortions when caterpillar exposure is unusually high, as happened in Kentucky in 2001 (or if the experimental dose of caterpillars is high). When exposure to the caterpillars is high, the first abortions occur very soon after first exposure, drawing immediate attention to the link between the caterpillars and the abortions. This random shooting model is also relevant to the single eyes. A disease of the eyes will usually affect both eyes, but single-eye events were seen with MRLS. With the gun analogy, the probability of any individual being hit in an eye is small; however, the probability of an individual being hit in both eyes is vanishingly small. The shooting model, therefore, explains the unique single-eye events of MRLS, perhaps the single most unusual and initially confounding characteristic of the entire MRLS syndrome.

== MRLS-related syndromes around the world ==
When the SPSE mechanism explaining MRLS was identified, it was immediately apparent that the model might be an ancient defensive mechanism of caterpillars, and that MRLS-like syndromes might well exist and be identified elsewhere. In 2004, Dr. Thomas Tobin was contacted by a horse farmer in NSW, Australia, who was faced with what she believed were caterpillar-related abortions on her farm in eastern Australia. She put Tobin in touch with the investigating veterinarian, Dr. Nigel Perkins, who at that time understood the Kentucky MRLS outbreak to be black cherry tree/cyanide-driven. Advice to Perkins was brief and unequivocal—given the similarities between MRLS and the syndrome he was describing and the possible role of caterpillars in his syndrome, his experimental approaches should be to first test the caterpillars, any and all other abortigenic candidates, test second. Following this advice, the recommended caterpillar administration experiments were performed and the local processionary caterpillar was identified as the cause of the Australian caterpillar-driven abortion syndrome, which was named "Equine Amnionitis and Fetal Loss".

A further indication of the possible ubiquity of caterpillar-related abortions comes from the western Sahara, where traditional camel pastoralists/herders have long known that pregnant camels exposed to caterpillars are at high likelihood of abortion or birth in a condition similar to the late-term MRLS fetuses. In the western Sahara, the condition is known as duda, the local term for caterpillar, and the link to the caterpillar is very well understood in the local Saharan camel pastoralist cultures. Considering the difficulty that certain groups in Kentucky had in accepting the theory of caterpillars causing MRLS, the long-time familiarity of a traditional camel-herding culture with the concept of caterpillar-driven abortions is interesting.

== Prevention and treatment ==
Because the black cherry tree is the preferred host tree for the eastern tent caterpillar, one approach to prevention is to simply remove the trees from the vicinity of horse farms, which was one of the first recommendations made concerning MRLS. Next, because the brief time for which the full-grown ETCs are on the ground in the vicinity of pregnant mares, simply keeping pregnant mares out of contact with them is also an effective preventative mechanism. In this regard, one Kentucky horse farm took the approach of simply muzzling mares during an ETC exposure period, an approach which was reportedly effective.

No effective treatment for MRLS is apparent. Mares which aborted are treated with broad-spectrum antibiotics to avoid bacterial infections. The foals born from mares infected with MRLS are given supportive care and supplied with medication to reduce inflammatory response and improve blood flow, but none of the treatments appears to be effective, as the majority of the foals do not survive. Unilateral uveitis is treated symptomatically with antibiotics and anti-inflammatory drugs.
