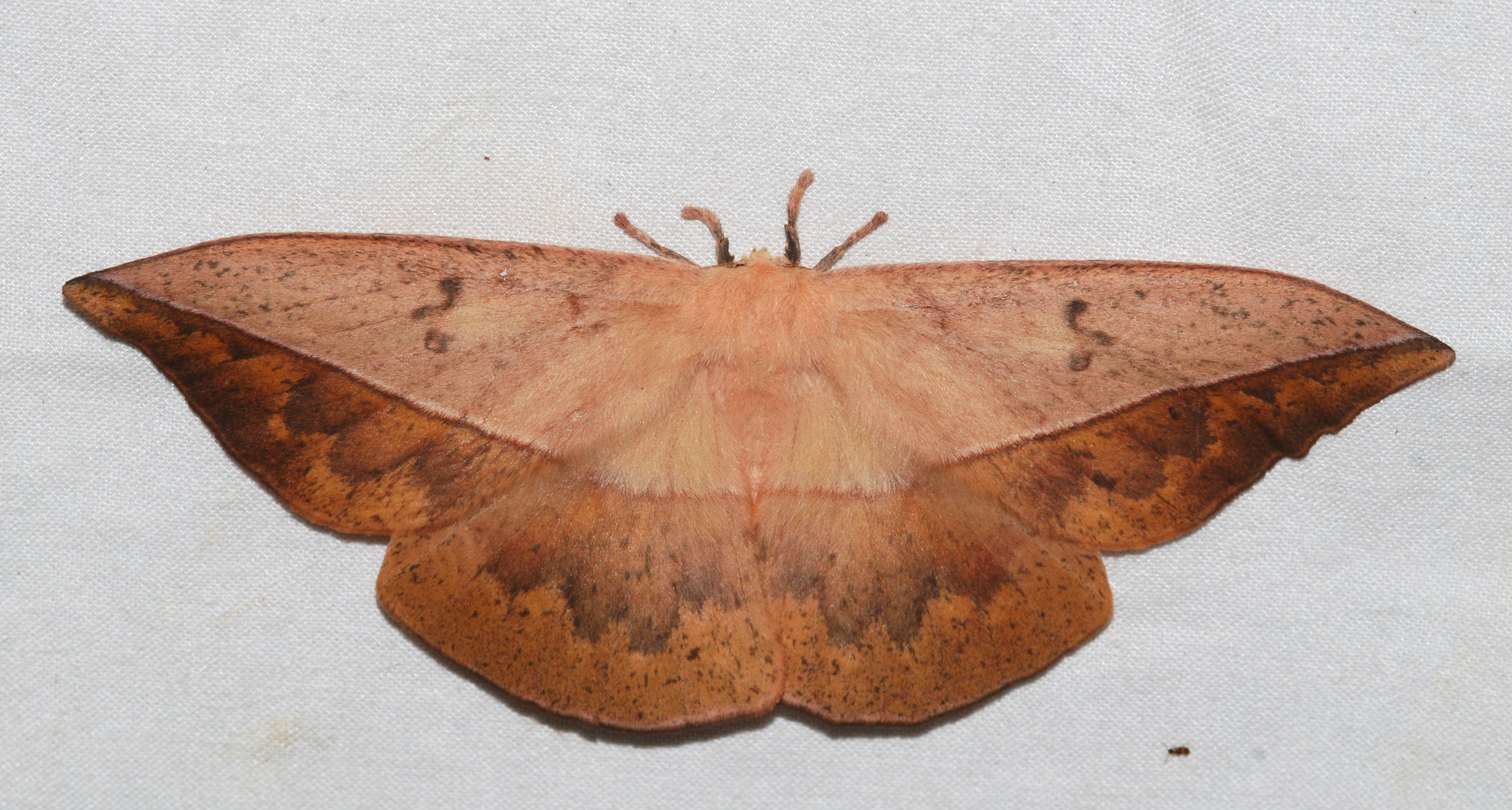
- Moth form of Lonomia achelous or saturniid moth

Scientific classification
- Kingdom: Animalia
- Phylum: Arthropoda
- Class: Insecta
- Order: Lepidoptera
- Family: Saturniidae
- Genus: Lonomia
- Species: L. achelous

Binomial name
- Lonomia achelous Cramer, 1777

= Lonomia achelous =

Species of moth

Lonomia achelous, the Brazilian caterpillar or giant silkworm moth caterpillar, is a venomous caterpillar endemic to South America. The species was first described by Pieter Cramer in 1777.

== Description and behavior ==
These caterpillars measure 50 mm in length, have a thick, bristle-covered body which is greenish brown, and a dark brown or black head capsule. Juveniles are usually light green, and darken with age. The moth's eggs are light greenish yellow in the shape of a barrel; they are placed in suitable host plants. The moth has a coloration of several shades of pale to medium brown, the wings are similar to a dead leaf, has a dark central fixation at the tip of the wing.

During the larval phase they are nocturnal, and they feed on leaves of shrubs and several woody trees. They are usually grouped on trunks or at the bottom of the same plants during the day. The larvae are covered by pointed hollow spines (spicules), the venom is injected into any intruder when fixed on the skin and broken.

== Distribution and habitat ==
It is found in South America, in Bolivia, Brazil, Colombia, Ecuador, French Guiana, Guyana, Peru, Suriname and Venezuela.

== Venom ==
Lonomia achelous venom has potent procoagulant and anticoagulant activity. Lonomin II and lonomin I activate fibrinolysis and lonomin V is a factor XIII protease, while lonomin IV, a factor Xa–like activator, and lonomin III, a direct prothrombin activator, can cause mild disseminated intravascular coagulation. Euglobulin lysis time is commonly increased, reflecting the predisposition for hemorrhage, including alveolar hemorrhage and intracranial hemorrhage, that can have a delayed manifestation in envenomated patients.
