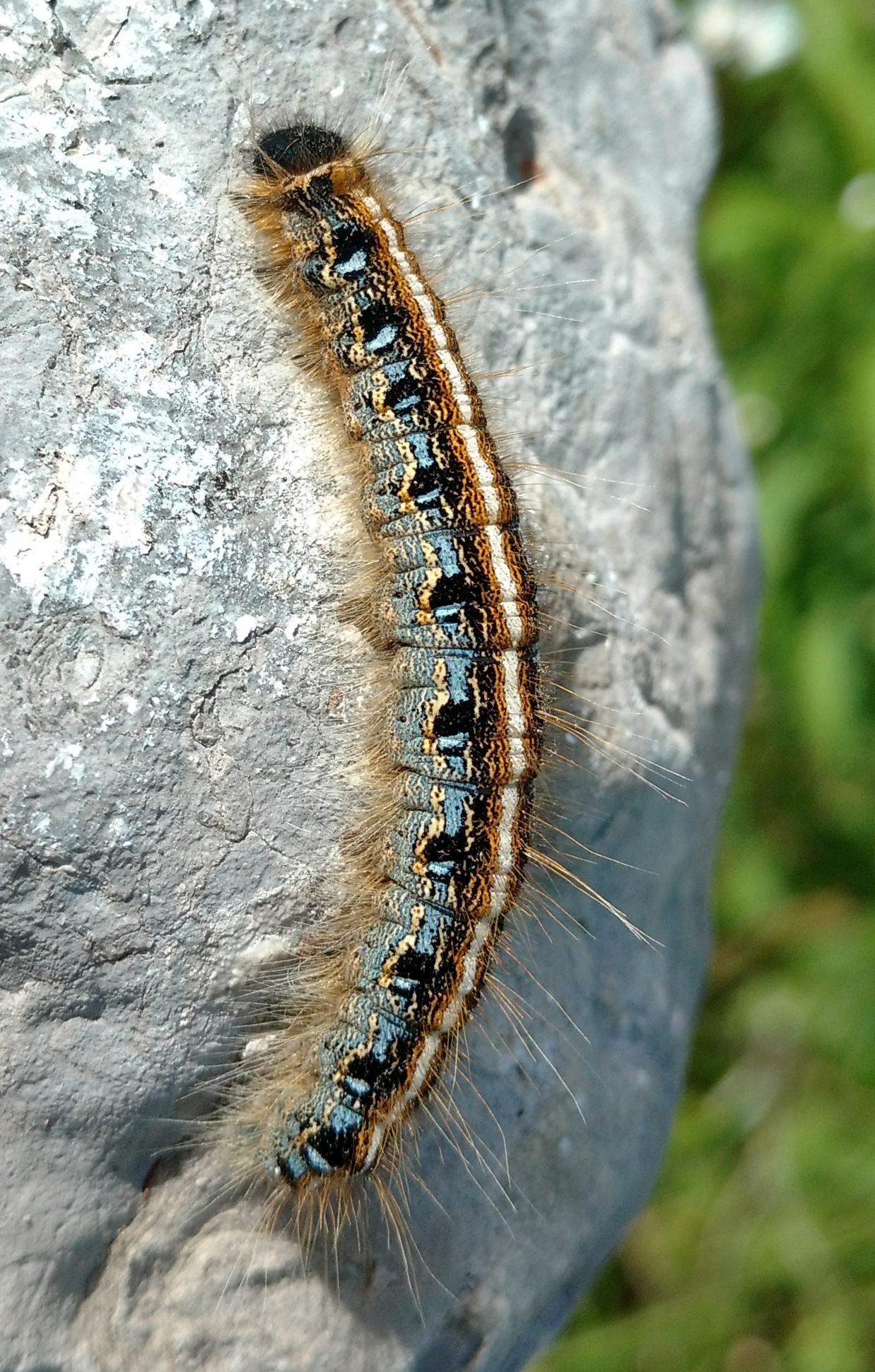
- Caterpillar
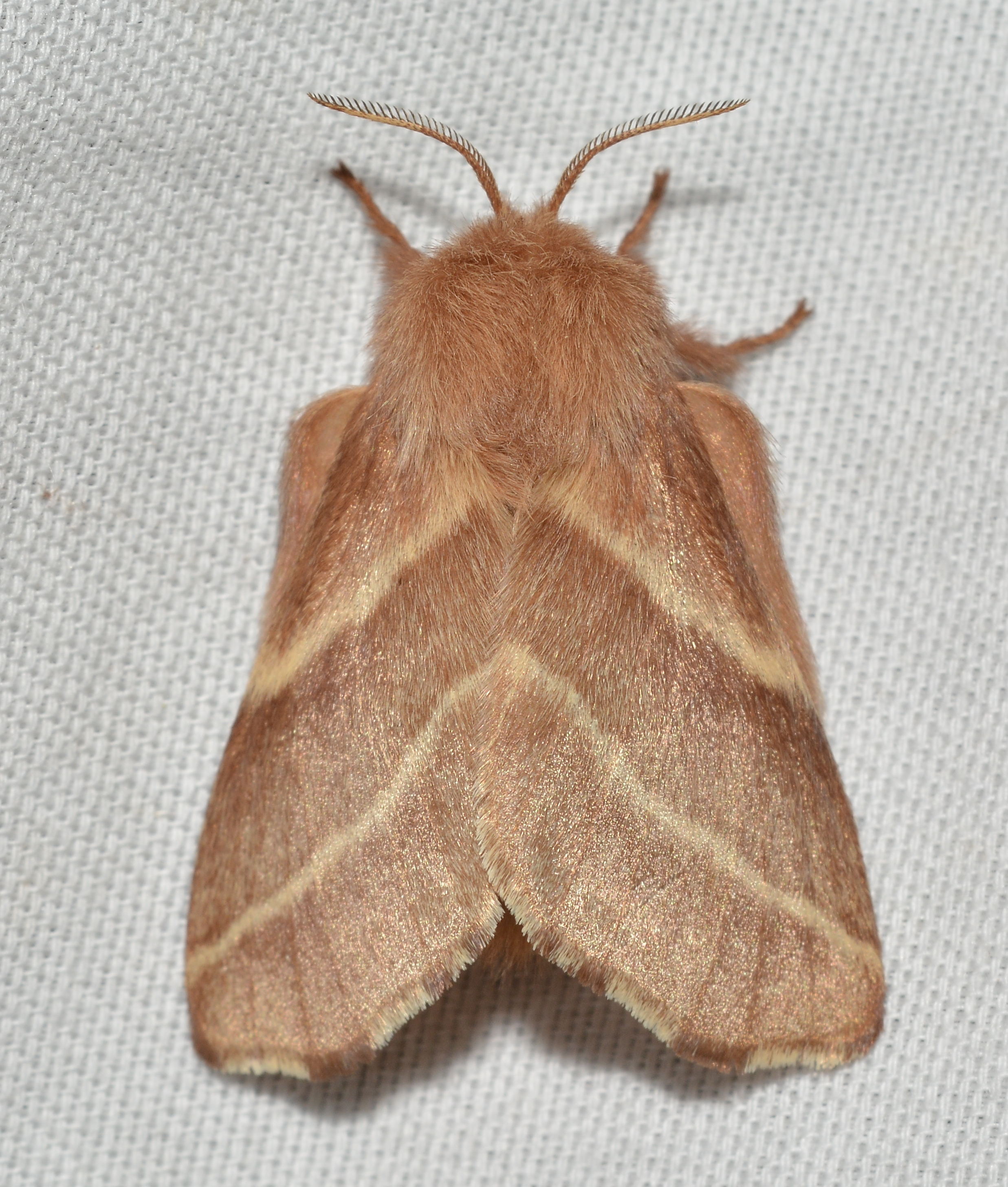
- Moth

Scientific classification
- Kingdom: Animalia
- Phylum: Arthropoda
- Clade: Pancrustacea
- Class: Insecta
- Order: Lepidoptera
- Family: Lasiocampidae
- Genus: Malacosoma
- Species: M. americanum

Binomial name
- Malacosoma americanum (Fabricius, 1793)

Synonyms
- Bombyx americana Fabricius, 1793; Bombyx pensylvanica Guérin-Méneville, [1832]; Clisiocampa decipiens Walker, 1855; Bombyx frutetorum Boisduval, 1869

= Eastern tent caterpillar =

Species of moth

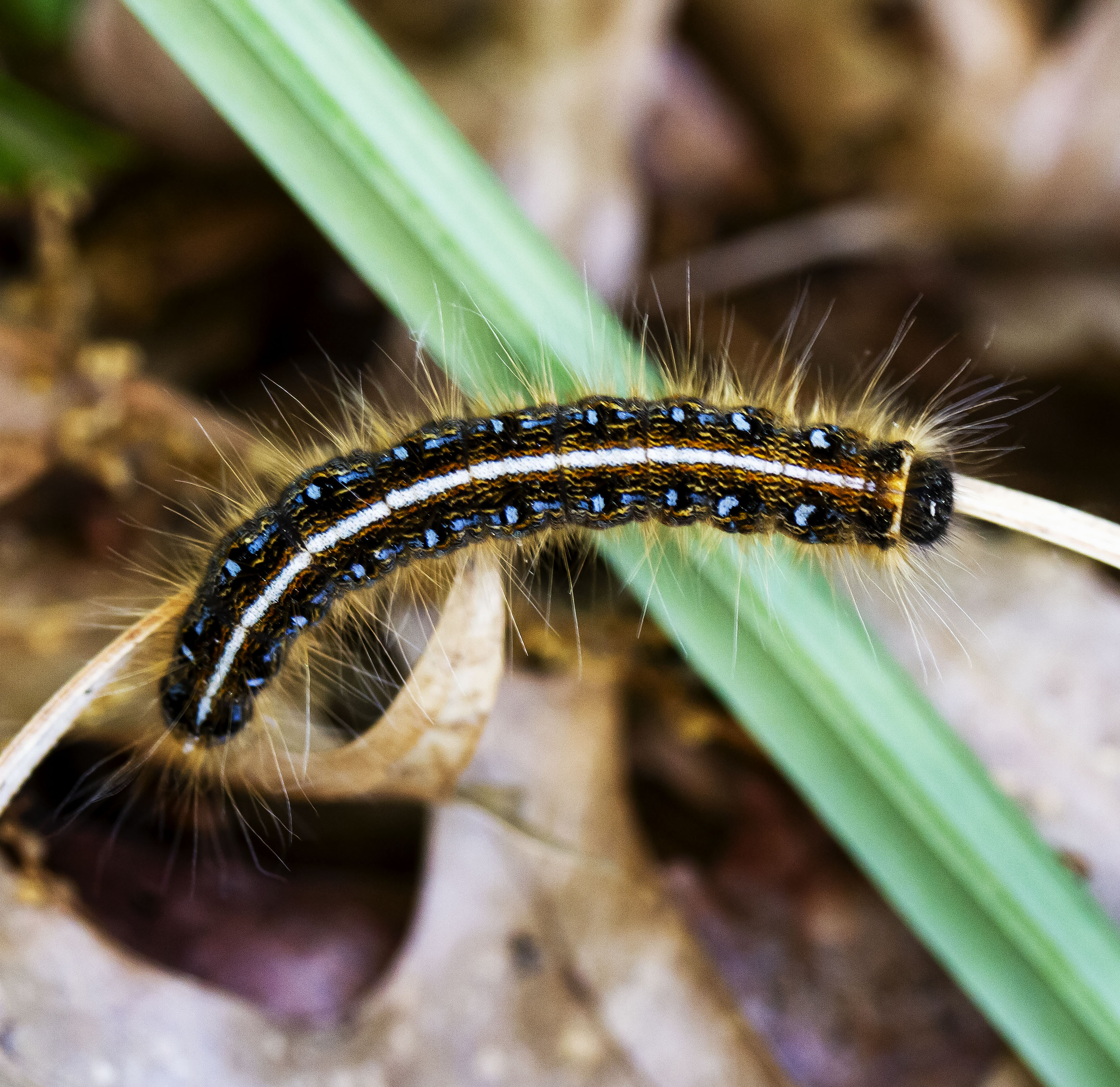
(Malacosoma americana) caterpillar

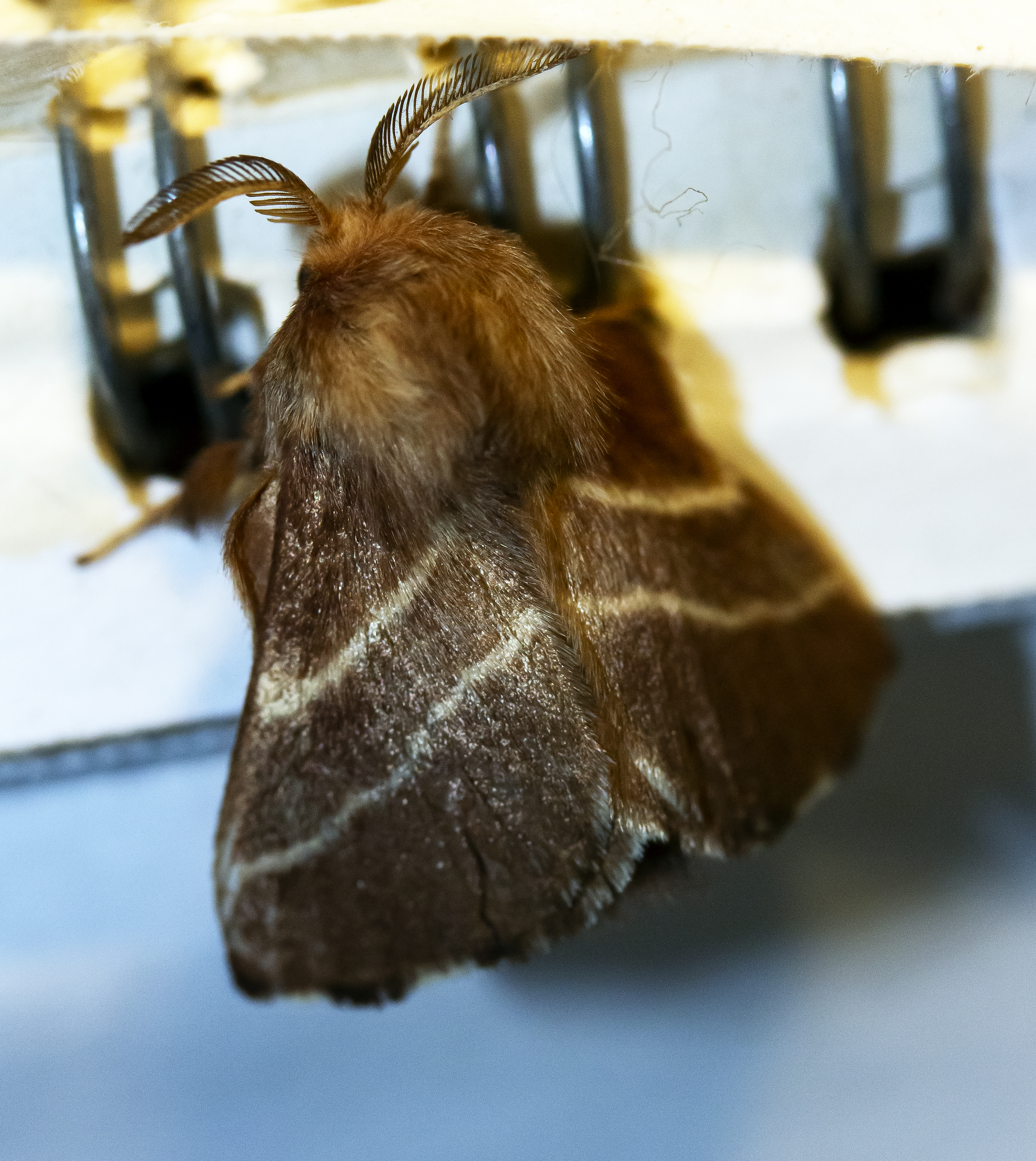
Eastern tent caterpillar moth (Malacosoma americana)

The eastern tent caterpillar (Malacosoma americanum) is a species of moth in the family Lasiocampidae, the tent caterpillars or lappet moths. It is univoltine, producing one generation per year. It is a tent caterpillar, a social species that forms communal nests in the branches of trees. It is sometimes confused with the spongy moth (whose larvae look similar) and the fall webworm (which also builds tents), and may be erroneously referred to as a bagworm, which is the common name applied to unrelated caterpillars in the family Psychidae. The moths oviposit almost exclusively on trees in the plant family Rosaceae, particularly cherry (Prunus) and apple (Malus). The caterpillars are hairy with areas of blue, white, black and orange. The blue and white colors are structural colors created by the selective filtering of light by microtubules that arise on the ball cuticle.

== Social behavior ==
Tent caterpillars are among the most social of larvae. The adult moth lays her eggs in a single batch in late spring or early summer. An egg mass contains about 200 to 300 eggs. Embryogenesis proceeds rapidly, and within three weeks, fully formed caterpillars can be found within the eggs. The small caterpillars lie quiescent until the following spring, when they chew their way out of the eggs just as the buds of the host tree begin to develop.

The newly hatched caterpillars initiate the construction of a silk tent soon after emerging. They typically aggregate at the tent site throughout their larval stage, expanding the tent each day to accommodate their increasing size. Under field conditions, the caterpillars feed three times each day, just before dawn, at midafternoon, and in the evening after sunset. During each bout of feeding, the caterpillars emerge from the tent, add silk to the structure, move to distant feeding sites en masse, feed, and then return immediately to the tent where they rest until the next activity period. The exception to this feeding pattern occurs in the last instar, when the caterpillars feed only at night. The insect has six larval instars. At the last stage, the caterpillars disperse and each constructs a cocoon in a protected place. The adult moths, or imagoes, emerge about two weeks later. They are strictly nocturnal and start flying after nightfall, coming to rest within a few hours of dawn. Mating and oviposition typically occur on the day the moths emerge from their cocoons; the females die soon thereafter.

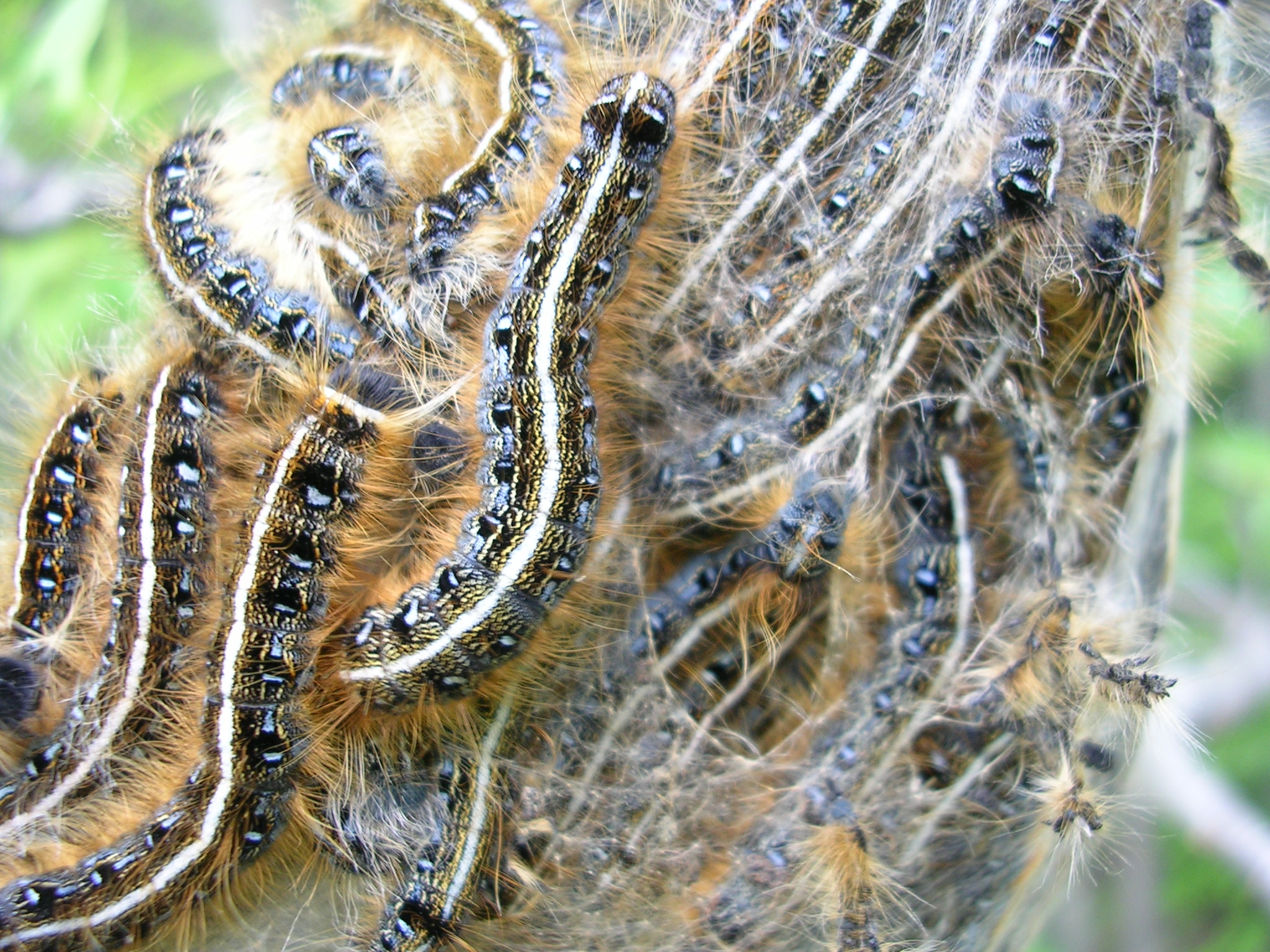
Tent after hatching

Tent caterpillars, like many other species of social caterpillars, vigorously thrash the anterior part of their bodies when they detect predators and parasitoids. Such bouts of thrashing, which may be initiated by a single caterpillar, radiate rapidly through the colony and may result in group displays involving dozens of caterpillars. Such displays create a moving target for tachinid flies, wasps, and other small parasitoids that would lay eggs on or in the body of the caterpillar. They also clearly deter stink bugs and other timid predators. Groups of caterpillars resting on the surface of the tent constitute aposematic displays. Cherry leaves are cyanogenic and the caterpillars regurgitate cyanide-laden juices when disturbed.

== Tents and temperature ==
The tent of this species is among the largest built by any tent caterpillar. It is constructed in the crotch of the host tree and is typically oriented with the broadest wall facing the southeast to take advantage of the morning sun. The caterpillars typically add silk to the surface of the structure at the onset of each of their daily activity periods. The silk is laid down under slight tension and it eventually contracts, causing the newly spun layer of silk to separate from the next layer. The tent thus consists of discrete layers separated by gaps within which the caterpillars rest. The tent has openings to allow them to enter and exit. Openings are often formed where branches jut from the structure, but are most common at the apex of the tent.

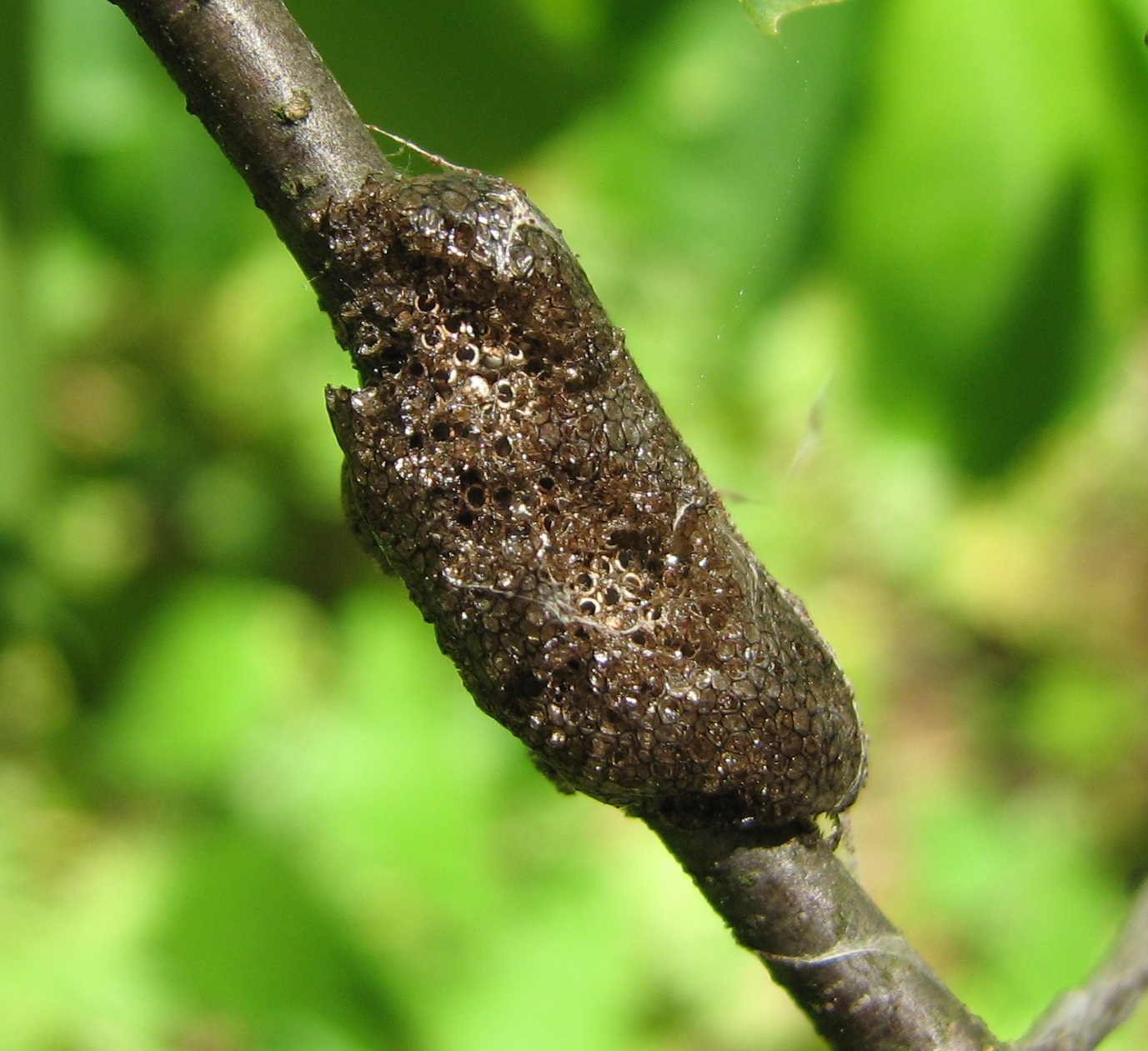
Egg mass on wild cherry

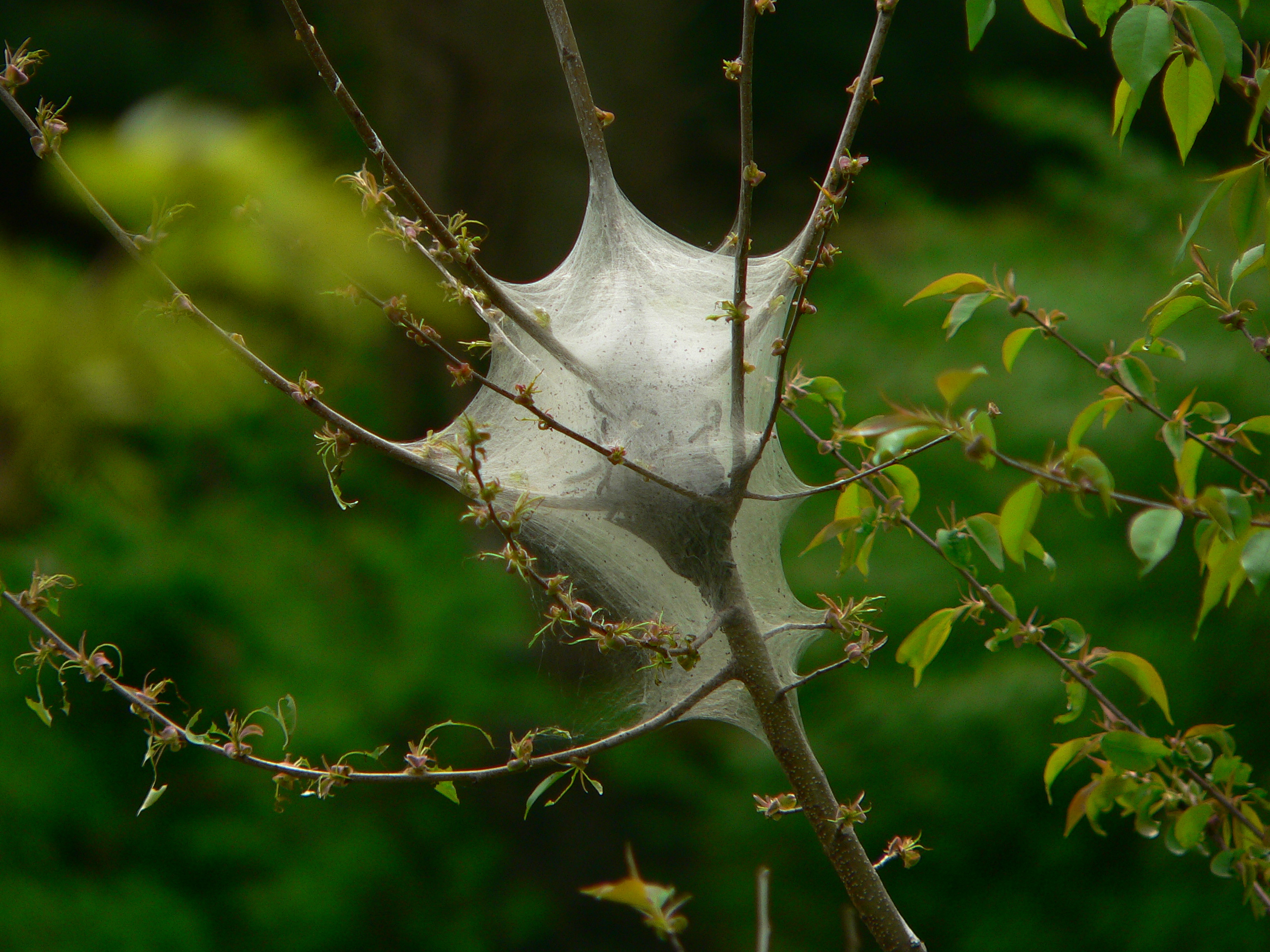
Communal tent

Light has a great effect on the caterpillars while they are spinning, and they spin the majority of their silk on the most illuminated face of the tent. Indeed, if, under experimental conditions, the dominant light source is directed at the tent from below, the caterpillars will build their tent upside down.

Caterpillars continue to expand their tent until they enter the last phase of their larval lives. The sixth-instar caterpillar conserves its silk for cocoon construction and adds nothing to the tent.

The tents are multifunctional. They facilitate basking, offer some protection from enemies, provide secure perches, and act as a staging site from which the caterpillars launch en masse forays to distant feeding sites. The elevated humidity inside the tent may facilitate molting.

Eastern tent caterpillars are among the earliest of caterpillars to appear in the spring. Because the early spring weather is often cold, the caterpillars rely on the heat of the sun to elevate their body temperatures to levels that allow them to digest their food. Studies show that below 15 °C (59 °F), the caterpillars are unable to process the food in their guts. Early instars are black and their bodies readily absorb heat. When basking, they typically pack together tightly, reducing heat loss due to convective currents. Their long setae also serve to stem convective heat loss. The caterpillars may aggregate on the surface of the tent or within it. The tents act as miniature greenhouses, trapping the heat of the morning sun and allowing the caterpillars to warm more quickly than they would if they remained outside. An aggregation of basking caterpillars can achieve temperatures in excess (T_{body}−T_{ambient}) of 44 °C (111 °F). They easily overheat, so the aggregation splits up when they reach a satisfactory temperature.

Because of its layered structure, the tent is thermally heterogeneous, and the caterpillars can adjust their temperature by moving from layer to layer. They may also aggregate on the outside of the shaded side of the tent and hang from the tips of their abdomens to enhance convective heat loss and cooling.

As has been shown for some other caterpillars, eastern tent caterpillars are capable of generating a small amount of metabolic heat while they digest their meals. When recently fed caterpillars pack tightly together, the temperature in the interior of the mass may be several degrees above ambient temperature even in the absence of a radiant heat source. It is unclear whether this small heat gain has a significant effect on the rate of their growth.

== Feeding ==
Tent caterpillars secrete silk from a spinneret wherever they go, and frequently-used pathways soon bear conspicuous silk trails. As the caterpillars move about the tree, they largely confine their movements to these trails. They lay down pheromones along the trails by dragging their abdomens. Caterpillars that find food may overmark the exploratory trails they follow back to the tent, creating recruitment trails. Recruitment trails are much more attractive to its brethren than exploratory trails, and serve to lead the group directly to the newest food source. A single successful forager can recruit the entire colony to its food find.

The exact identity of the trail pheromone of the eastern tent caterpillar has not yet been determined, but the chemical 5β-cholestane-3-one has been shown to be fully competitive with it. Caterpillars readily follow trails of this chemical, even abandoning their own trails in favor of artificial trails prepared with the compound.

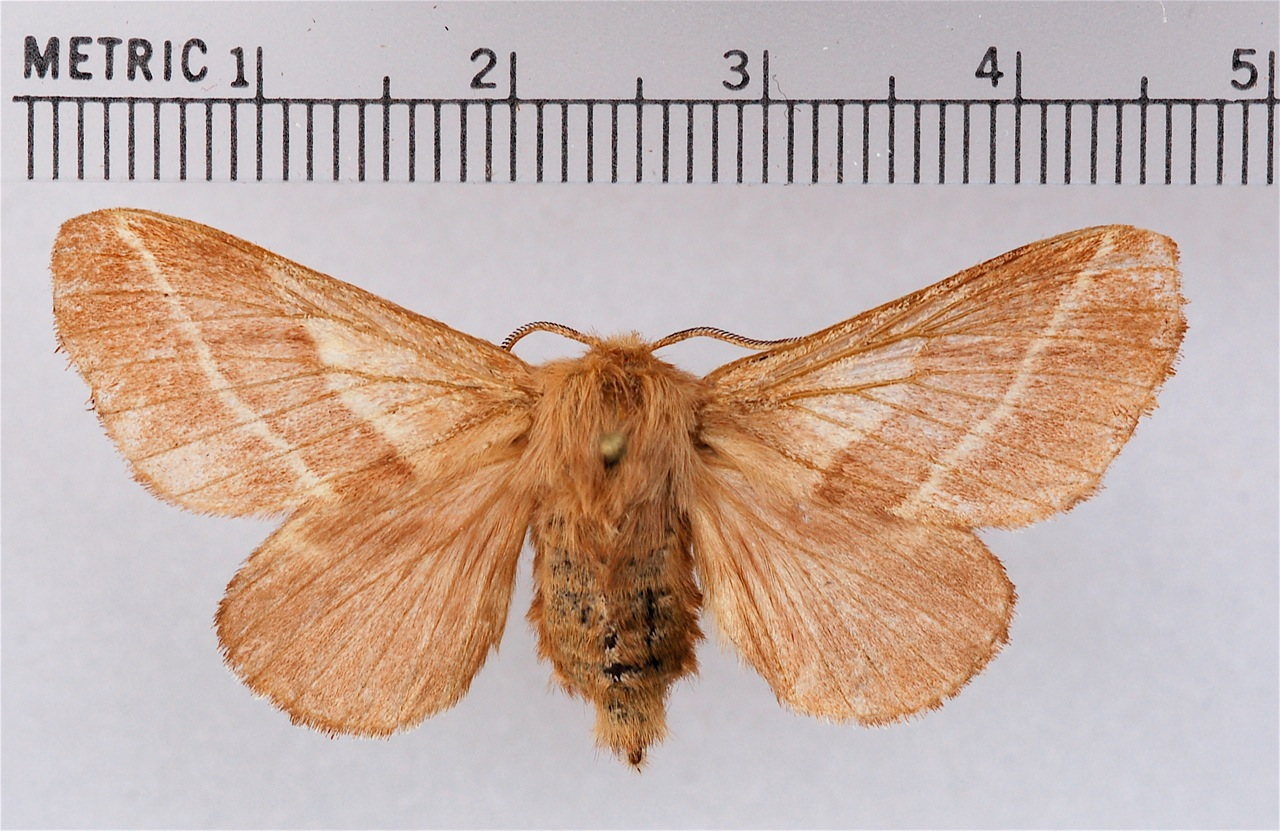
Female

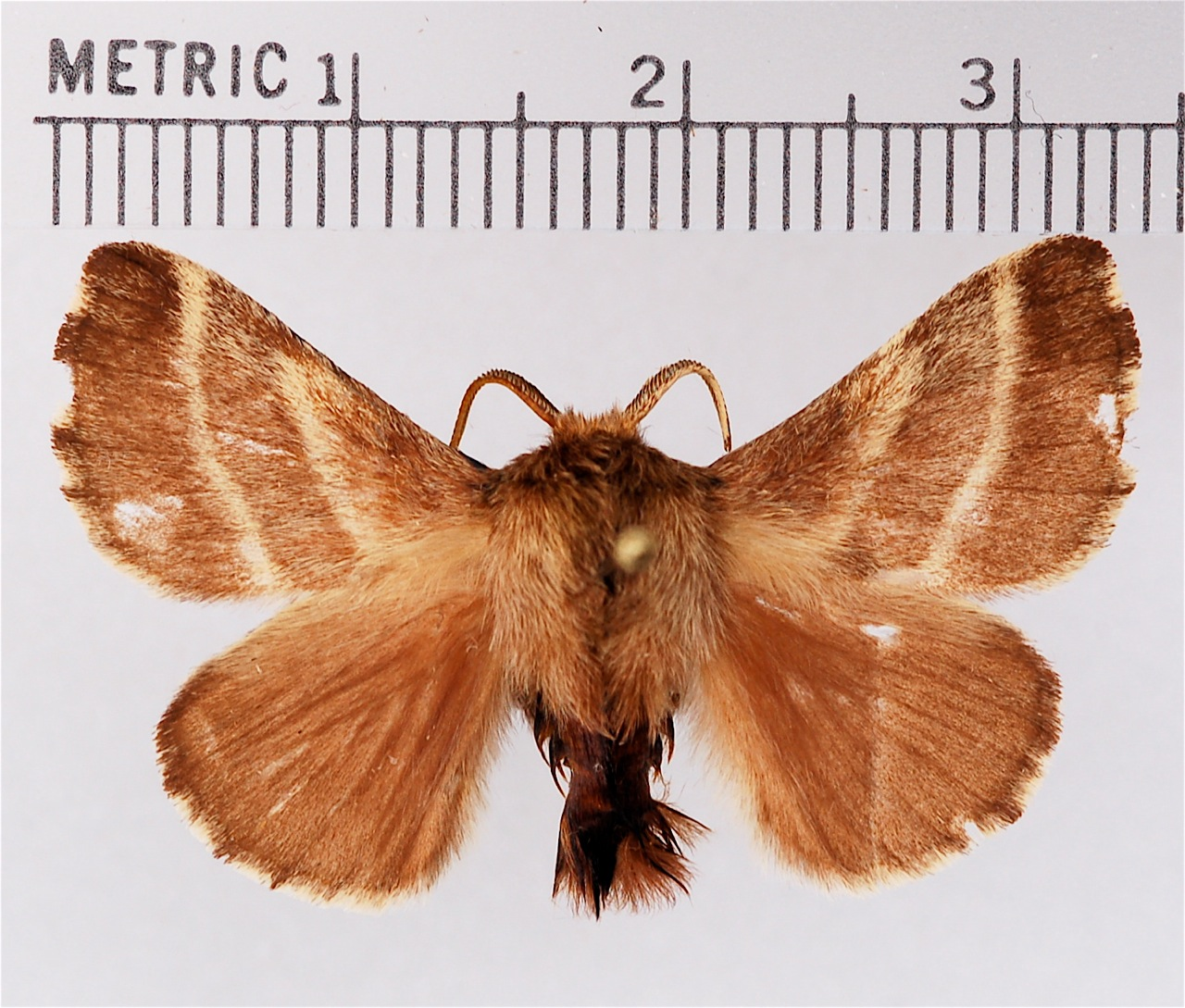
Male

== Spread ==
The species is found in the eastern Nearctic region of the northern United States and southern Canada in wooded areas.

== Pest status ==
The eastern tent caterpillar is of some importance as a pest because it defoliates ornamental trees. Damaged trees, however, typically recover and refoliate within several weeks.

== Toxicity ==
The eastern tent caterpillar is toxic to horses. It has been linked to mare reproductive loss syndrome in horses, but the exact mechanism by which the caterpillar triggers abortion has yet to be determined. Experimental studies have shown that when pregnant mares are fed eastern tent caterpillars, they abort. The caterpillars of this species often feed on the highly cyanogenic black cherry tree (Prunus serotina) and the mares were originally thought to abort in response to the cyanide they consumed along with the caterpillars. However, that hypothesis was disproved. In another study, the necropsy of a mare fed eastern tent caterpillars showed fragments of the caterpillar's setae had embedded in the gut wall, and it was hypothesized that they may facilitate the passage of infective agents from the horse's gut into the bloodstream and then to the placenta, triggering abortion.
