= Rugowithius longissimus =

Scientific classification
- Kingdom: Animalia
- Phylum: Arthropoda
- Subphylum: Chelicerata
- Class: Arachnida
- Order: Pseudoscorpiones
- Family: Withiidae
- Genus: Rugowithius
- Species: R. longissimus

Binomial name
- Rugowithius longissimus Harvey, 2015

Species of pseudoscorpion

Rugowithius longissimus is a species of pseudoscorpion in the Withiidae family. It was described in 2015 by Australian arachnologist Mark Harvey. The specific epithet longissimus (Latin: 'longest') refers to the large size of the species compared to Rugowithius bulbosus.

== Description ==
Body lengths of males are 2.50–2.85 mm; that of the female paratype is 2.24 mm. The colour is dark red-brown.

== Distribution and habitat ==
The species occurs in Far North Queensland in rainforest habitats. The type locality is 20 km north of Cape Tribulation.

== Behaviour ==
The pseudoscorpions are terrestrial predators.
