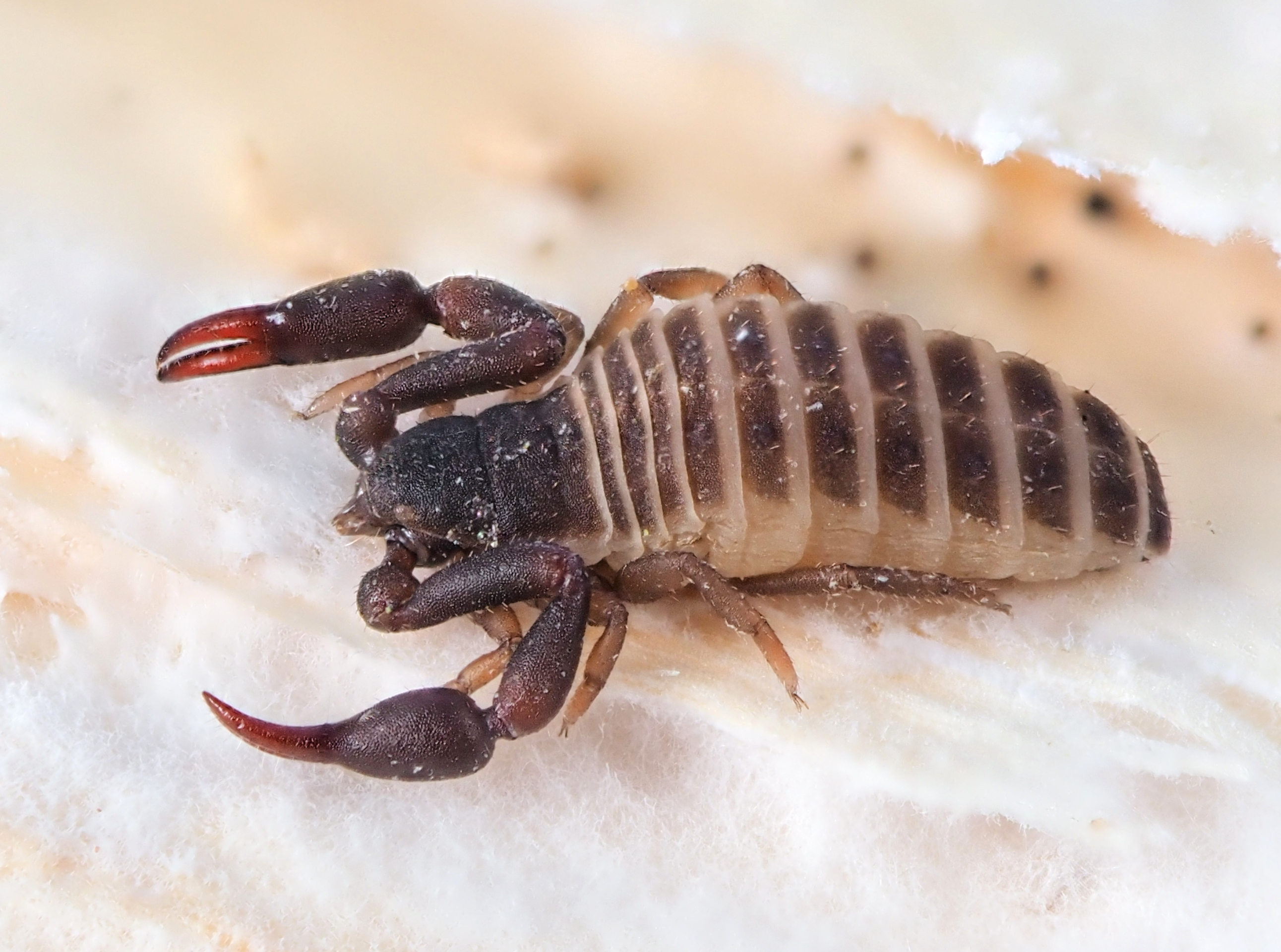

Scientific classification
- Kingdom: Animalia
- Phylum: Arthropoda
- Subphylum: Chelicerata
- Class: Arachnida
- Order: Pseudoscorpiones
- Family: Withiidae
- Genus: Withius
- Species: W. piger

Binomial name
- Withius piger (Simon, 1878)

Synonyms
- Chelifer piger Simon, 1878; Chelifer subruber Simon, 1879; Chelifer (Trachychernes) oculatus Beier, 1929

= Withius piger =

Species of pseudoscorpion

Withius piger is a species of pseudoscorpion in the Withiidae family. It was described in 1878 by French arachnologist Eugène Simon.

== Distribution and habitat ==
The species has a cosmopolitan distribution, often in human-dominated environments, and has been widely introduced. The type locality is Bou Saâda, Algeria.

== Behaviour ==
The pseudoscorpions are synanthropic, terrestrial predators.
