= Rugowithius bulbosus =

Scientific classification
- Kingdom: Animalia
- Phylum: Arthropoda
- Subphylum: Chelicerata
- Class: Arachnida
- Order: Pseudoscorpiones
- Family: Withiidae
- Genus: Rugowithius
- Species: R. bulbosus

Binomial name
- Rugowithius bulbosus Harvey, 2015

Species of pseudoscorpion

Rugowithius bulbosus is a species of pseudoscorpion in the Withiidae family. It was described in 2015 by Australian arachnologist Mark Harvey. The specific epithet bulbosus (Latin: 'swollen') refers to the swollen basal region of the pedipalpal femur.

== Description ==
Body lengths of males are 1.95–2.08 mm; those of females 1.60–2.91 mm. The colour is generally dark red-brown.

== Distribution and habitat ==
The species occurs in the Top End of the Northern Territory. The type locality is Manngarre Rainforest at Cahills Crossing, on the banks of the East Alligator River, Kakadu National Park. The pseudoscorpions were found under fig tree bark.

== Behaviour ==
The pseudoscorpions are terrestrial predators.
