= Animal attacks in the United States =

Animal attacks in the United States may refer to:

- List of fatal alligator attacks in the United States
- List of fatal shark attacks in the United States
- List of fatal snake bites in the United States
- List of fatal dog attacks in the United States

== See also ==
- Animal attacks in Latin America
- Animal attacks in Australia
