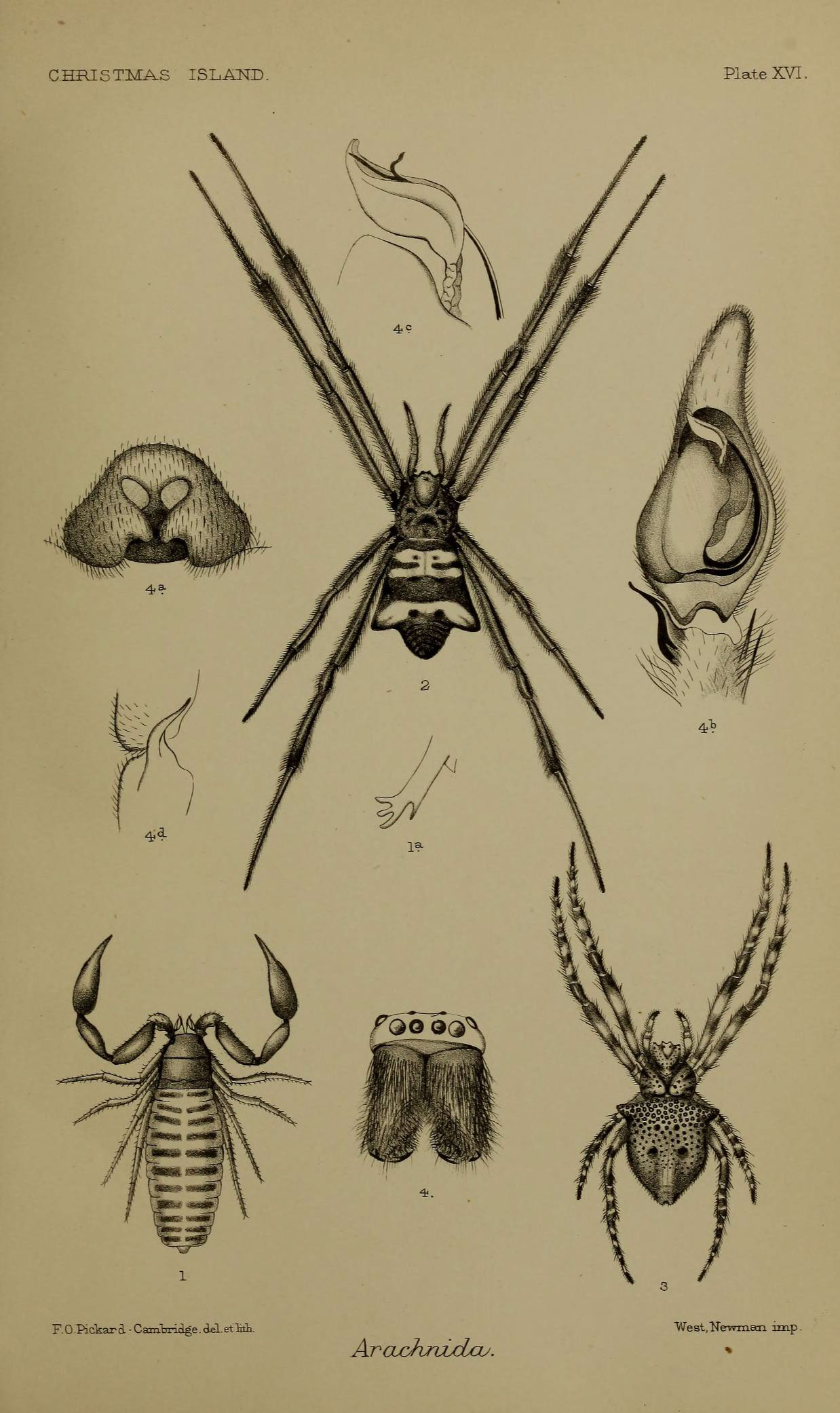
- Metawithius murrayi (bottom left)

Scientific classification
- Kingdom: Animalia
- Phylum: Arthropoda
- Subphylum: Chelicerata
- Class: Arachnida
- Order: Pseudoscorpiones
- Family: Withiidae
- Genus: Metawithius
- Species: M. murrayi

Binomial name
- Metawithius murrayi (Pocock, 1900)

Synonyms
- Chelifer murrayi Pocock, 1900

= Metawithius murrayi =

Species of pseudoscorpion

Metawithius murrayi is a species of pseudoscorpion in the Withiidae family. It was described in 1900 by British arachnologist Reginald Innes Pocock.

== Distribution and habitat ==
The species occurs in Southeast Asia, including Indian Ocean islands, Indonesia and Timor. The type locality is North West Point on Australia's Christmas Island.

== Behaviour ==
The pseudoscorpions are terrestrial predators.
