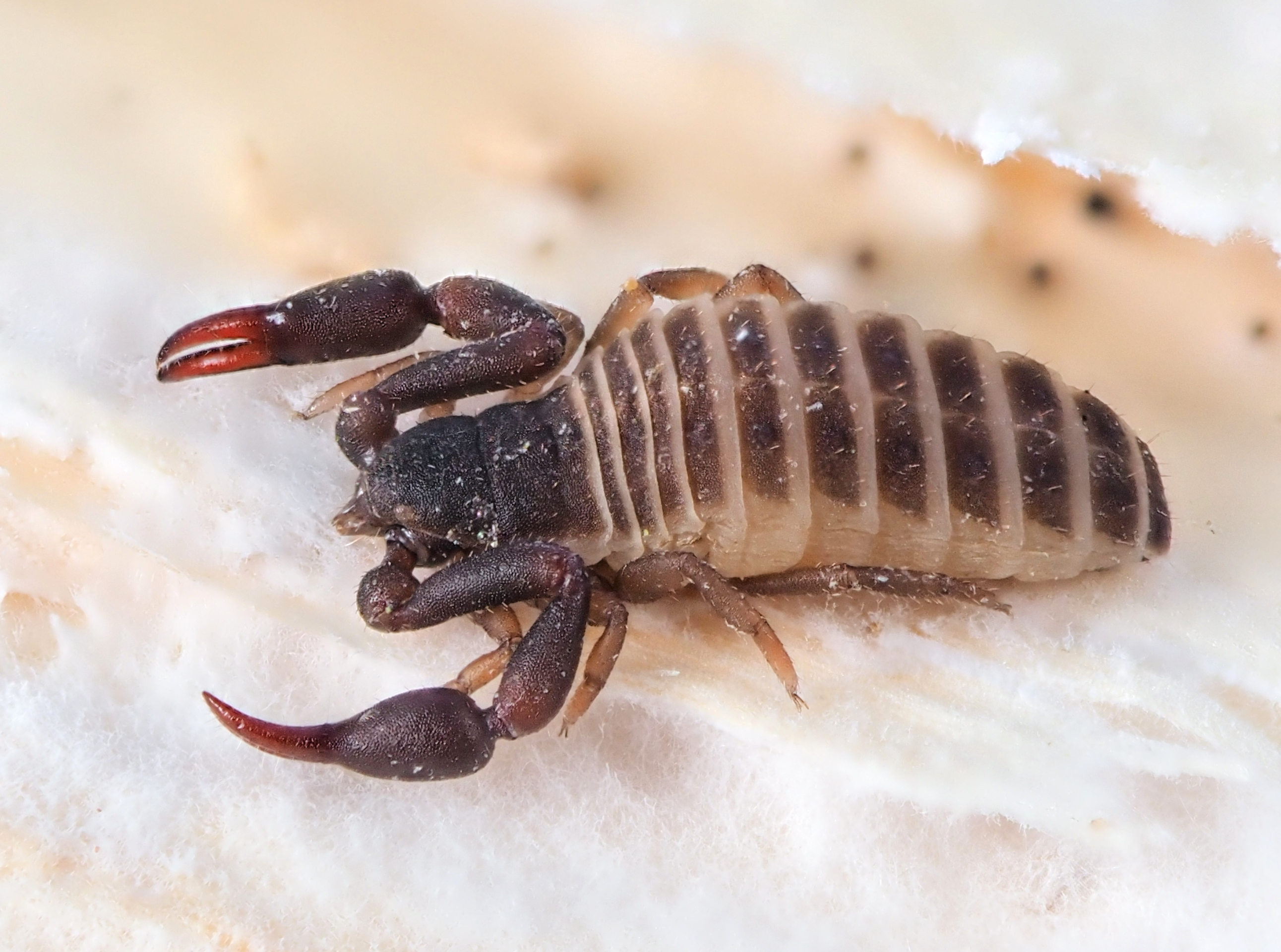
- Withius piger

Scientific classification
- Kingdom: Animalia
- Phylum: Arthropoda
- Subphylum: Chelicerata
- Class: Arachnida
- Order: Pseudoscorpiones
- Family: Withiidae
- Genus: Withius; Kew, 1911

Type species
- Chelifer subruber Simon, 1879

Synonyms
- Allowithius Beier, 1932; Xenowithius Beier, 1953

= Withius =

Genus of pseudoscorpions

Withius is a genus of pseudoscorpions in the Withiidae family. It was described in 1911 by English zoologist Harry Wallis Kew. The generic name Withius honours Danish arachnologist Carl Johannes With (1877–1923).

== Species ==
The genus contains the following species:

- Withius abyssinicus (Beier, 1944)
- Withius angolensis (Beier, 1948)
- Withius angustatus (Tullgren, 1907)
- Withius arabicus Mahnert, 1980
- Withius ascensionis (Beier, 1961)
- Withius australasiae (Beier, 1932)
  - Withius australasiae australasiae (Beier, 1932)
  - Withius australasiae formosanus (Beier, 1937)
- Withius brevidigitatus Mahnert, 1988
- Withius ceylanicus (Ellingsen, 1914)
- Withius congicus (Beier, 1932)
  - Withius congicus congicus (Beier, 1932)
  - Withius congicus exiguus (Beier, 1955)
- Withius despaxi Vachon, 1937
- Withius faunus (Simon, 1879)
- Withius fuscus Mahnert, 1988
- Withius glabratus (Ellingsen, 1910)
- Withius gracilipalpus Mahnert, 1988
- Withius hispanus (L. Koch, 1873)
- Withius indicus Murthy and Ananthakrishnan, 1977
- Withius japonicus Morikawa, 1954
- Withius kaestneri (Vachon, 1937)
- Withius lagunae (Moles, 1914)
- Withius lawrencei (Beier, 1935)
- Withius laysanensis (Simon, 1899)
- Withius leggi Nassirkhani, 2022
- Withius lewisi (Beier, 1946)
- Withius litoreus (Beier, 1935)
- Withius madagascarensis (Ellingsen, 1895)
- Withius nanus Mahnert, 1988
- Withius neglectus (Simon, 1878)
- Withius paradoxus (Ellingsen, 1912)
- Withius pekinensis (Balzan, 1892)
- Withius piger (Simon, 1878)
- Withius rebierei Heurtault, 1971
- Withius simoni (Balzan, 1892)
- Withius somalicus (Beier, 1932)
- Withius suis Sivaraman, 1980
- Withius tenuimanus (Balzan, 1892)
- Withius termitophilus (Tullgren, 1907)
- Withius texanus (Banks, 1891)
- Withius transvaalensis (Beier, 1953)
- Withius tweediei (Beier, 1955)
- Withius vachoni (Beier, 1944)
- Withius vagrans Chamberlin, 1925

=== Fossil species ===
- Withius eucarpus (Dalman, 1826)
