= Rugowithius =

Scientific classification
- Kingdom: Animalia
- Phylum: Arthropoda
- Subphylum: Chelicerata
- Class: Arachnida
- Order: Pseudoscorpiones
- Family: Withiidae
- Genus: Rugowithius; Harvey, 2015

Type species
- Rugowithius bulbosus Harvey, 2015

Genus of pseudoscorpions

Rugowithius is a genus of pseudoscorpions in the Withiidae family. It is endemic to northern Australia. It was described in 2015 by Australian arachnologist Mark Harvey.

== Etymology ==
The genus name Rugowithius comes from Latin ruga ('crease' or 'wrinkle'), referring to the corrugated patch of cuticle on the male maxillae, combined with the generic name Withius honouring Danish arachnologist Carl Johannes With (1877–1923).

== Species ==
The genus contains the following species:

- Rugowithius bulbosus Harvey, 2015
- Rugowithius longissimus Harvey, 2015
