= Metawithius =

Scientific classification
- Kingdom: Animalia
- Phylum: Arthropoda
- Subphylum: Chelicerata
- Class: Arachnida
- Order: Pseudoscorpiones
- Family: Withiidae
- Genus: Metawithius; Chamberlin, 1931

Type species
- Chelifer murrayi Pocock, 1900

Synonyms
- Microwithius Redikorzev, 1938; Hyperwithius Beier, 1951

Genus of pseudoscorpions

Metawithius is a genus of pseudoscorpions in the Withiidae family. It was described in 1931 by American arachnologist Joseph Conrad Chamberlin.

== Species ==
The genus contains the following species:

- Metawithius annamensis (Redikorzev, 1938)
- Metawithius dawydoffi (Beier, 1951)
- Metawithius keralensis Johnson, Mathew, Sebastian & Joseph, 2019
- Metawithius murrayi (Pocock, 1900)
- Metawithius nepalensis (Beier, 1974)
- Metawithius philippinus Beier, 1937
- Metawithius spiniventer Redikorzev, 1938
  - Metawithius spiniventer pauper Beier, 1953
  - Metawithius spiniventer spiniventer Redikorzev, 1938
- Metawithius tonkinensis (Beier, 1951)
