= Animal attacks in Australia =

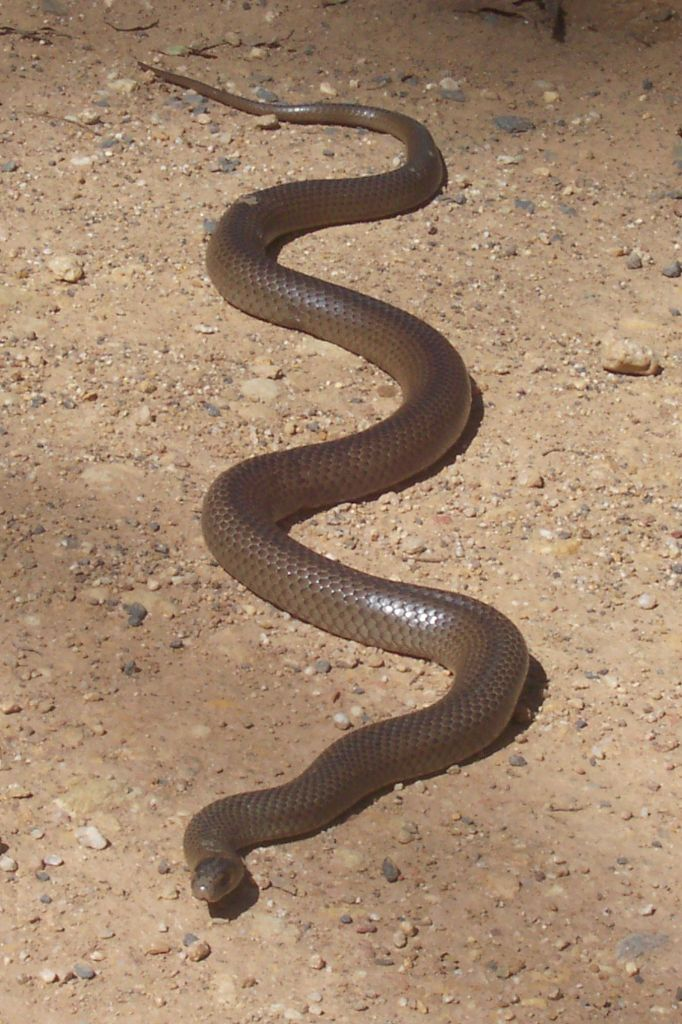
The brown snake is not the most venomous Australian snake, but it has caused the most deaths.

Wildlife attacks in Australia occur every year from several different native species, including snakes, spiders, freshwater and saltwater crocodiles, various sharks, cassowaries, dingoes, kangaroos, stingrays and stonefish and a variety of smaller marine creatures such as bluebottles, blue-ringed octopus, cone shells and jellyfish.

It is estimated that there are about 100,000 dog attacks in Australia each year, of which around 3,000 result in hospitalizations.

== Land ==
=== Cassowary ===
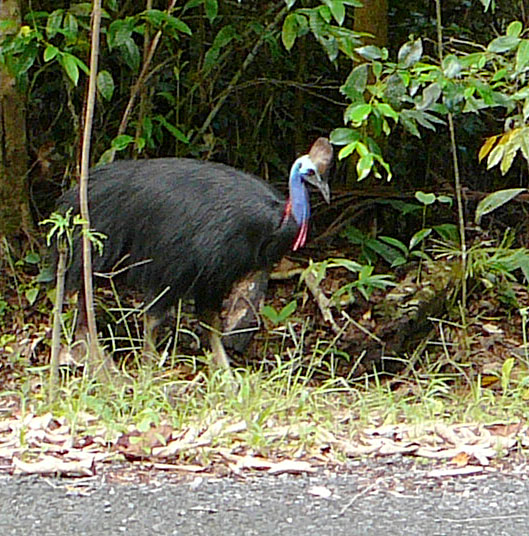
Cassowary

Cassowaries have a reputation for being dangerous to people and domestic animals. The 2007 edition of the Guinness World Records lists the cassowary as the world's most dangerous bird. During World War II American and Australian troops stationed in New Guinea were warned to steer clear of them.

In his book Living Birds of the World from 1958, ornithologist Thomas E. Gilliard wrote:

The inner or second of the three toes is fitted with a long, straight, murderous nail which can sever an arm or eviscerate an abdomen with ease. There are many records of natives being killed by this bird.

However, Gilliard did not include any such records or any references for them, and although this assessment of the danger posed by cassowaries has been repeated in print by authors including Gregory S. Paul (1988), and Jared Diamond (1997) recent research on hundreds of cassowary attacks has only been able to find one human death.

A 2003 study of attacks by the southern cassowary in Queensland found no wounds larger than punctures about 1.5 centimetres in diameter. Of 221 attacks studied, 150 were against humans. A total of 75% of these were from cassowaries that had been fed by people. In 71% of cases the bird chased or charged the victim. In 15% of cases they kicked. Of the attacks, 73% involved the birds expecting or snatching food, 5% involved defending natural food sources, 15% involved defending themselves from attack, 7% involved defending their chicks or eggs. Of all 150 attacks there was only one human death.

The one documented human death caused by a cassowary was that of Phillip Mclean, aged 16, and it happened on 6 April 1926. He and his brother, aged 13, were attempting to beat the cassowary to death with clubs. They were accompanied by their dog. The bird kicked the younger boy, who fell and ran away. Then the older boy struck the bird. The bird charged and knocked the older boy to the ground. While on the ground, Phillip was kicked in the neck, opening a 1.25 centimetre wound. Phillip got up and ran but died shortly afterwards from the haemorrhaging blood vessel in his neck.

Cassowary strikes to the abdomen are among the rarest of all, but there is one case of a dog that was kicked in the belly in 1995. The blow left no puncture, but there was severe bruising. The dog later died from an apparent intestinal rupture.

=== Dingoes ===
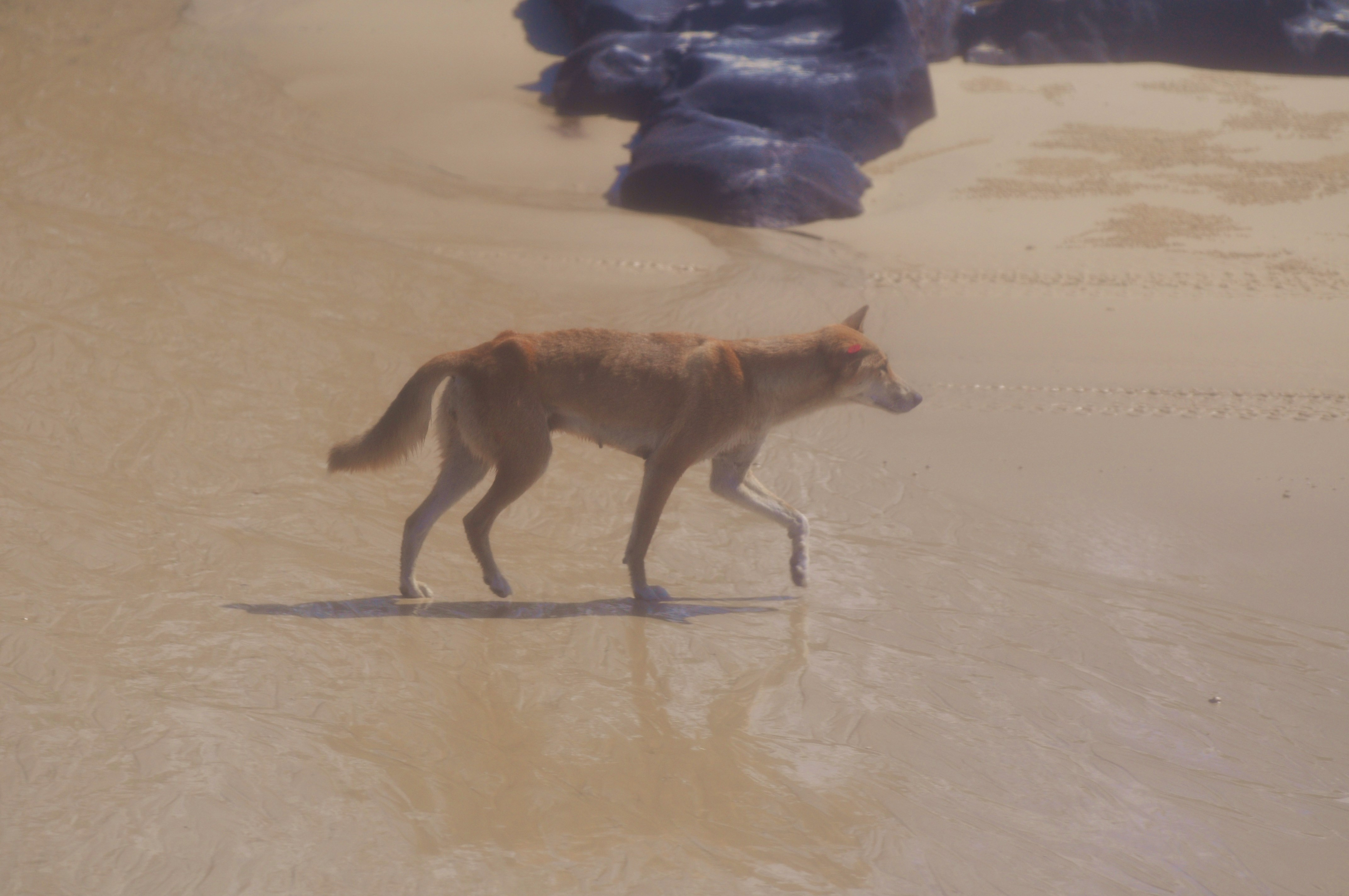
A dingo on the beach at K'gari

Dingo attacks in Australia are rare but can happen. Dingos are more of a danger to livestock such as sheep which is why the Dingo Fence was constructed. As wild dogs are large predators, they can be potentially dangerous to humans. The likelihood of wild dogs being a danger to humans depends to a large degree on how humans behave toward them. The more frequently these dogs are fed or scavenge human leftovers, the more likely it is that they lose all caution and sometimes react aggressively towards humans when they no longer receive or find food. Even when habituation to humans seems to be the cause for attacks, it is not clear what the ultimate cause for attacks and overall threat towards humans is. The first well documented case of a dingo attack on K'gari is from the year 1988. Already 60 years before, a newspaper account reported of problems with dingoes. Between 1996 and 2001 altogether 279 incidences with dingoes have been reported, with 39 of the cases assessed as "major" and one as "catastrophic". In April 2001 at Waddy Point on K'gari, a nine-year-old male was attacked and killed by two dingoes. On 19 August 1980 a nine-week-old girl named Azaria Chamberlain was captured by a dingo near the Uluru and killed. Her mother was suspected and convicted of murder. Four years later she was released from prison when the jacket of the baby was found in a dingo den and the mother was therefore found innocent. This incident caused much outcry for and against the dingoes. To be better prepared for dingo attacks demands were made that a better recording of problematic cases should be implemented. Also non-lethal guns, spray cans with appropriate content, whips and aversive baits should be used to increase the caution of the dingoes.

=== Emu ===
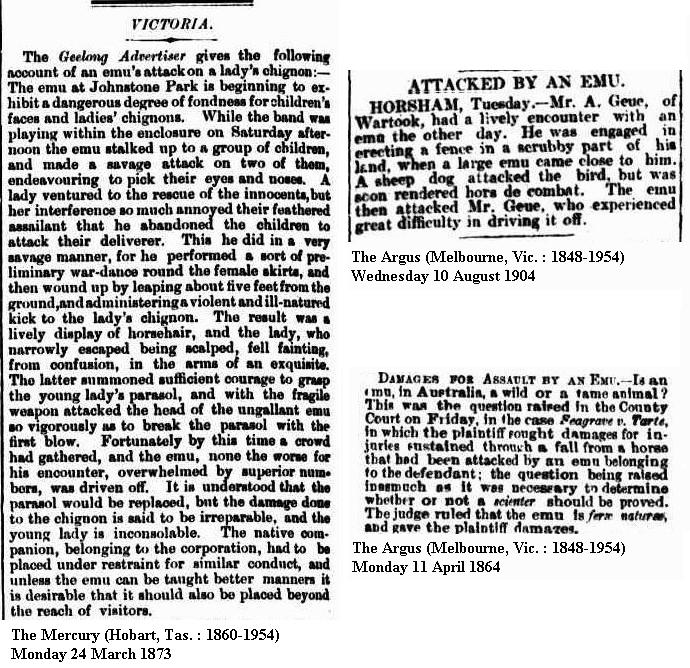
Emu attacks which appeared in old Australian newspapers

Emu attacks are rare but have occurred. When attacked, the emu will move in a zigzag pattern to prevent attacks from the wedge tailed eagle, or use kicking at close range. In 1932 many emus moved into farm territory in Western Australia, with the army called in to dispatch them in the so-called Emu War. Some attacks noted include in 1957 an emu charged a car, in 1904 an emu attacked a dog's owner after the dog attacked it, in 1873 an emu attacked children and a woman at Johnstone Park, Geelong. A man fell off a horse which was attacked by an emu in Bullarook in 1864 which went to court as Seagrave v Tarte, where the judge ruled the emu is ferae naturae.

=== Kangaroos ===
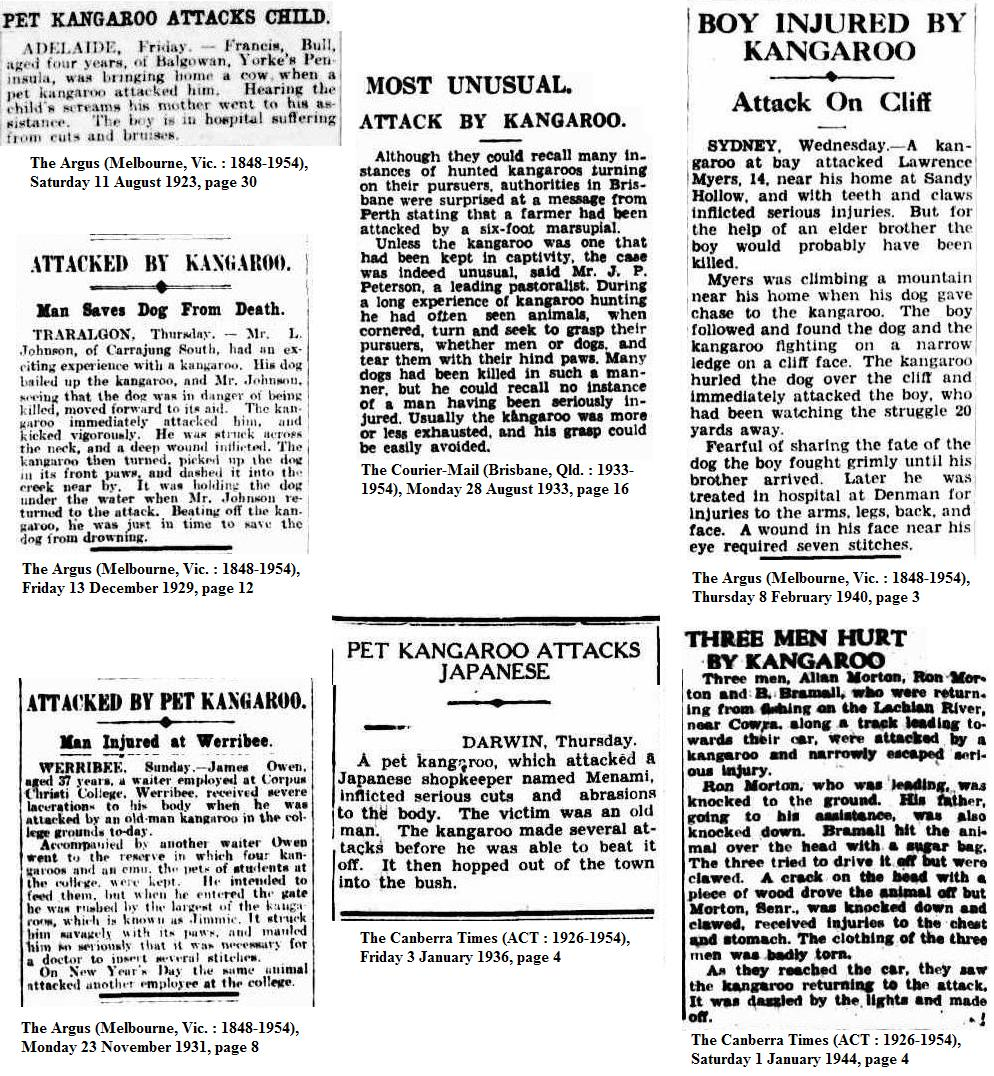
Kangaroo attacks described in old newspapers.

Kangaroo attacks in Australia are rare because kangaroos are usually docile; however, they can attack when provoked or cornered, and they have been known to kill dogs. Very occasionally they can attack even if not provoked. If there is a shortage of food, kangaroos will enter suburbs, and may attack (which may be unintentional or in self-defence), as noted in Melbourne and Canberra.

There were two incidents in 1999 and 2002, and 15 to 20 reports in the area between Coffs Harbour and Sydney. The New South Wales Court of Appeal ruled in Shorten v Grafton District Golf Club (2000) that a golf course had a duty of care to warn patrons of the danger of kangaroo attack, after a 13-year-old boy was injured by one in 1996.

The Queensland Department of Environment and Resource Management mentions kangaroos can be aggressive towards people, and advises that if approached by an aggressive kangaroo, people should keep it at a distance so that it cannot kick or scratch. An Animal Planet video on avoiding kangaroo attacks says the main defence is to keep moving out of the animal's kicking range.

Several of the attacks have been widely reported in international media. In particular a 1988 attack in the Grampians which was filmed was shown on World's Most Shocking Moments and reported elsewhere. The 1996 attack on the golf course in Grafton was shown on After the Attack and reported by National Geographic and others. The recent attacks in Sunbury were widely reported in Australia as well as international media. In March 2009 a kangaroo smashed through the window of a suburban house in Garran which also made international news.

A 77-year-old man died in 2022 after being attacked by a kangaroo he had been keeping as a pet in Redmond, Western Australia. It is the first fatal kangaroo attack reported in Australia since 1936.

=== Magpies ===
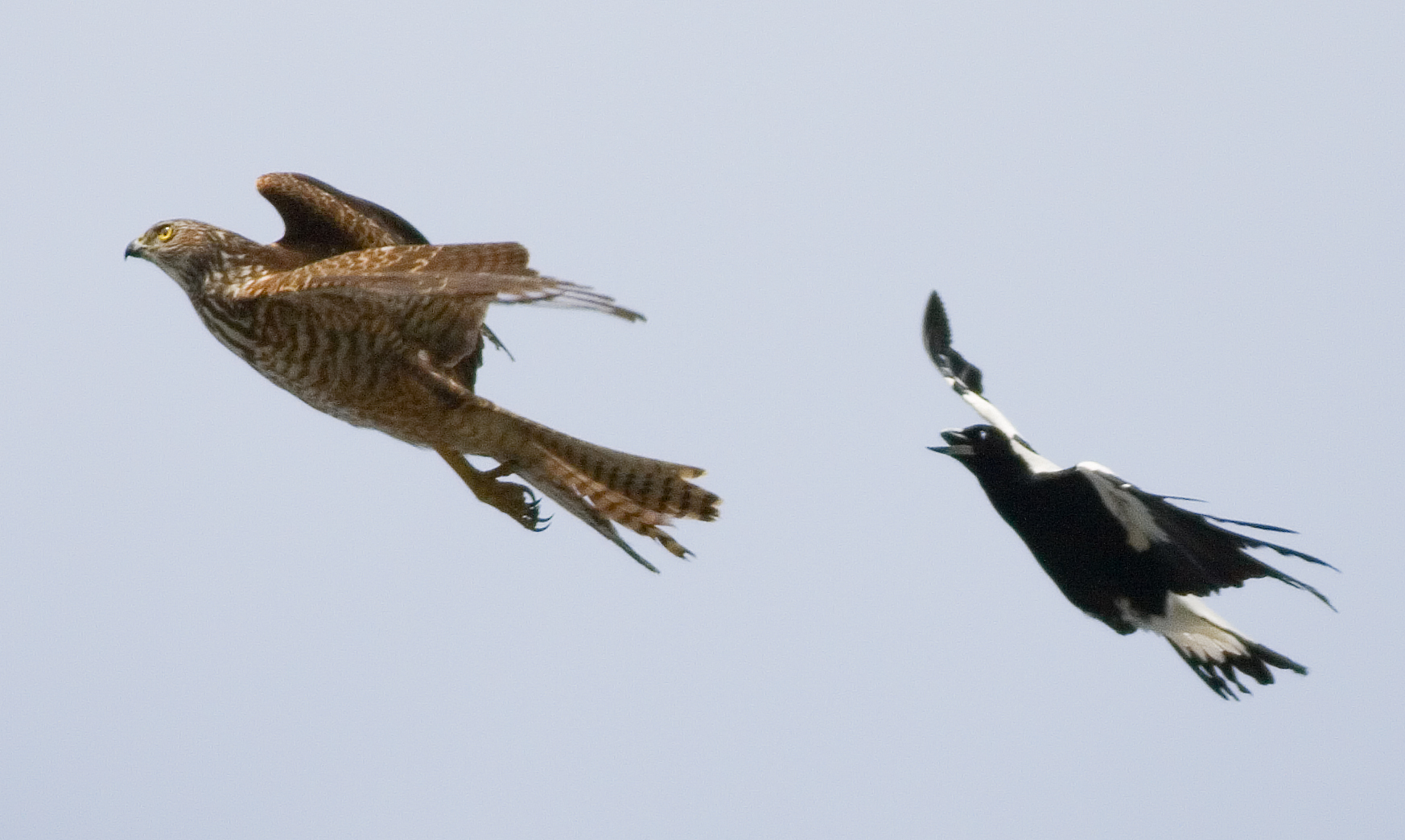
A magpie defending its territory from a brown goshawk

The Australian magpie often swoops people in suburban areas. There are three known deaths from a magpie attack: one caused by tetanus, a second when an elderly cyclist crashed his bicycle while attempting to avoid being dive-bombed, and most recently in August 2021 a third death when a baby died as a mother tried to protect her from a swooping magpie. Magpies are ubiquitous in urban areas all over Australia, and have become accustomed to people. A small percentage of birds become highly aggressive during breeding season from late August to early October, and will swoop and sometimes attack passers by. These magpies may engage in an escalating series of behaviours to drive off intruders. Least threatening are alarm calls and distant swoops, where birds fly within several metres from behind and perch nearby. Next in intensity are close swoops, where a magpie will swoop in from behind or the side and audibly "snap" their beaks or even peck or bite at the face, neck, ears or eyes. More rarely, a bird may dive-bomb and strike the intruder's (usually a cyclist's) head with its chest. A magpie may rarely attack by landing on the ground in front of a person, lurching up and pecking at the face and eyes. Attacks begin as the eggs hatch, and tail off as the chicks leave the nest.

Magpie attacks can cause injuries, including wounds to the head and the eyes, with the potential for bacterial infections from a beak used to fossick in the ground. A case of anaphylaxis was reported after a Magpie attack. If it is necessary to walk near the nest, wearing a broad-brimmed or legionnaire's hat or using an umbrella will deter attacking birds, but beanies and bicycle helmets are not entirely effective, as birds can attack the sides of the head and neck. Magpies prefer to swoop at the back of the head; therefore, keeping the magpie in sight at all times can discourage the bird. Magpies are a protected native species in Australia, and it is illegal to kill or harm them. However, this protection is removed in some Australian states if a magpie attacks and harms a human, allowing for the bird to be killed if it is considered particularly aggressive (such a provision is made, for example, in section 54 of the South Australian National Parks and Wildlife Act).

=== Snakes ===
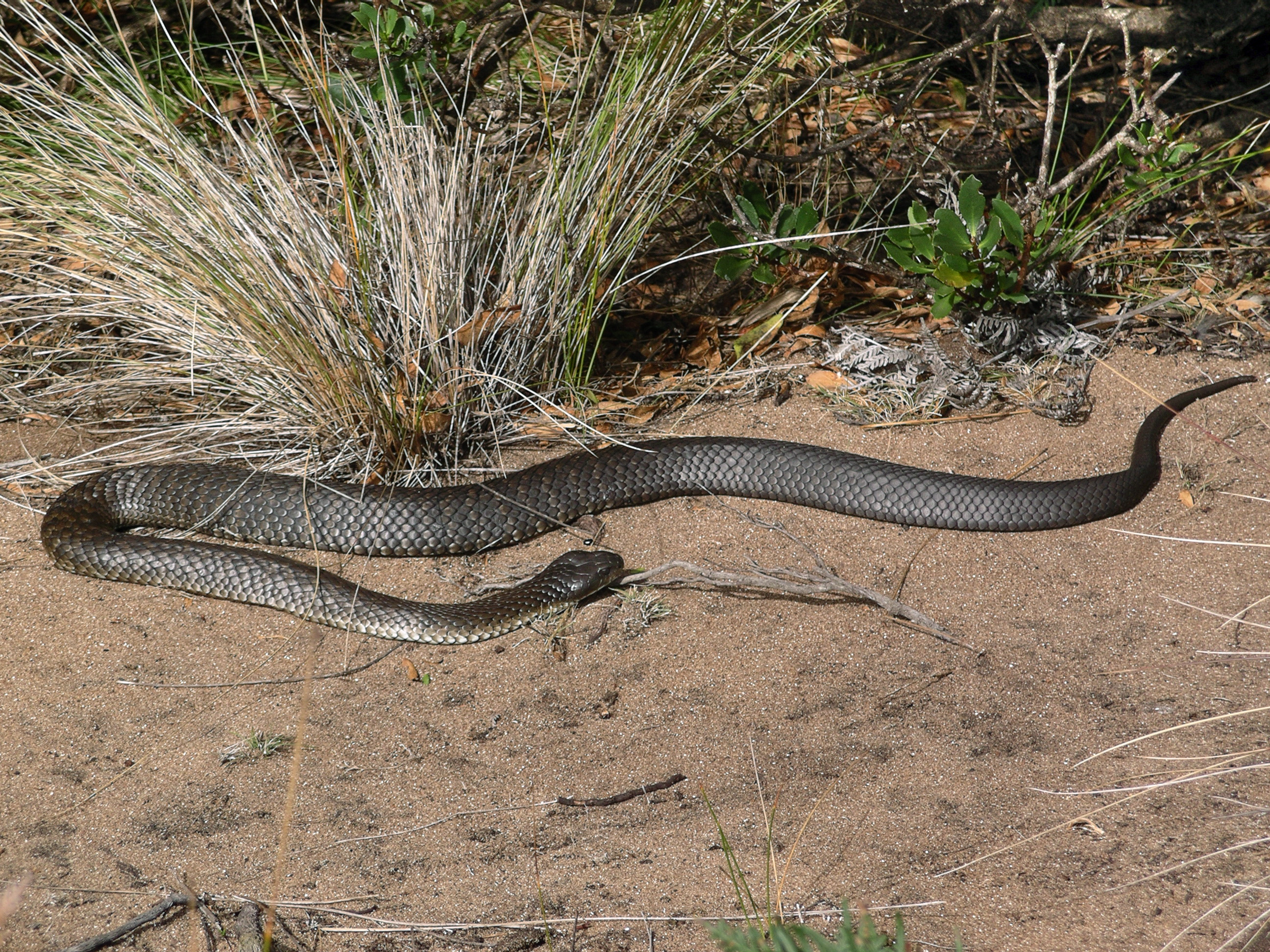
The tiger snake was previously the most deadly snake before antivenom became increasingly available.

Snake attacks in Australia which cause deaths are less common than they used to be due to increased medical knowledge and more readily available antivenom. Around half of all deaths from snakebites are caused by brown snakes. In Australia, the only continent where venomous snakes constitute the majority of species, the taipan, tiger snake and eastern brown snake inflict virtually all reported venomous bites. The latter is responsible for perhaps 60% of deaths caused by snakebite. Although Australian snakes are among the most venomous in the world (the inland or western taipan having the most toxic venom), wide access to antivenom has made deaths exceedingly rare, with only a few fatalities each year. Australian snakes are known to possess particularly potent venom: 10 of the world's most venomous snakes, as measured by LD_{50} in mice, inhabit the continent.

The estimated incidence of snakebites annually in Australia is between 3 and 18 per 100,000 with an average mortality rate of 4 per 100,000 per year. Between 1979 and 1998 there were 53 deaths from snakes, according to data obtained from the Australian Bureau of Statistics. Between 1942 and 1950 there were 56 deaths from snakebite recorded in Australia. Of 28 deaths in the 1945–49 period, 18 occurred in Queensland, 6 in New South Wales, 3 in Western Australia and 1 in Tasmania.

Availability of antivenom has reduced the number of fatalities from tiger snake bite, which previously had caused the most fatalities. Four types of tiger snake ranked among the top 10 of the world's most venomous snakes. The inland taipan is the most venomous land snake in the world, but is only located in remote desert regions. The red-bellied black snake is common, but less venomous than other deadly snakes.

=== Spiders ===
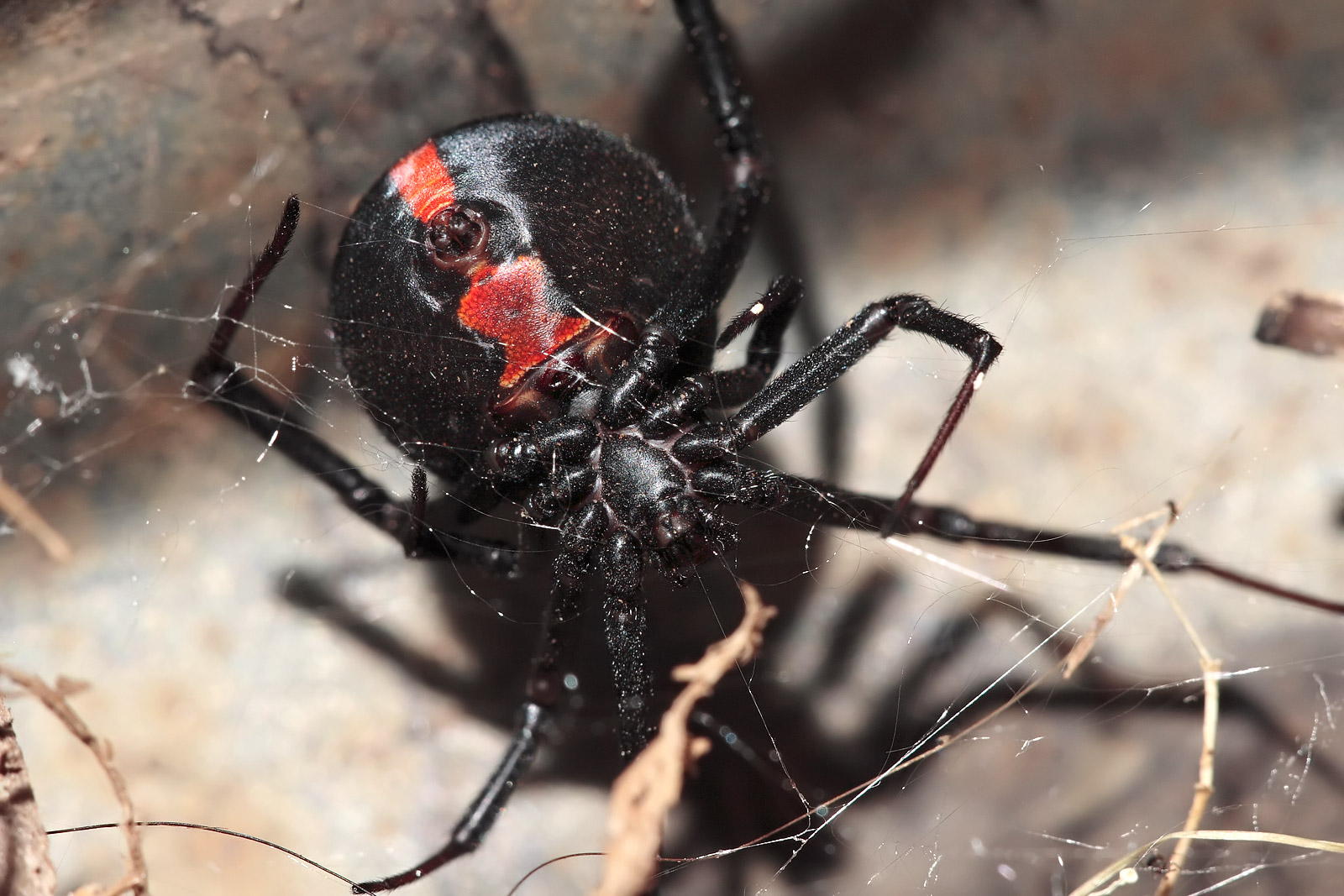
Redback spider

There are spider attacks in Australia every year, but deaths are much less common, and are mostly in the very young or old. There have been 14 recorded deaths due to funnel-web spider bite.

Between 1963 and 1976 there were more than 2000 cases of redback spider bites reported to the Commonwealth Serum Laboratories. There are more than 250 cases of redback spider bite which receive antivenom each year. There are around 2000 redback spider bites each year, while antivenom for funnel-web spider bites has been given to more than 100 patients since 1980.

It is believed that thousands of people are bitten each year across Australia by the redback spider, although only about 20% of bite victims require treatment.

Besides the funnel-web spider and the redback spider, there is also the mouse spider which can cause severe illness in young children, although serious cases are rare. The white-tailed spider's bite can cause nausea and local pain.

== Oceans, coasts and rivers ==
=== Blue-ringed octopus ===
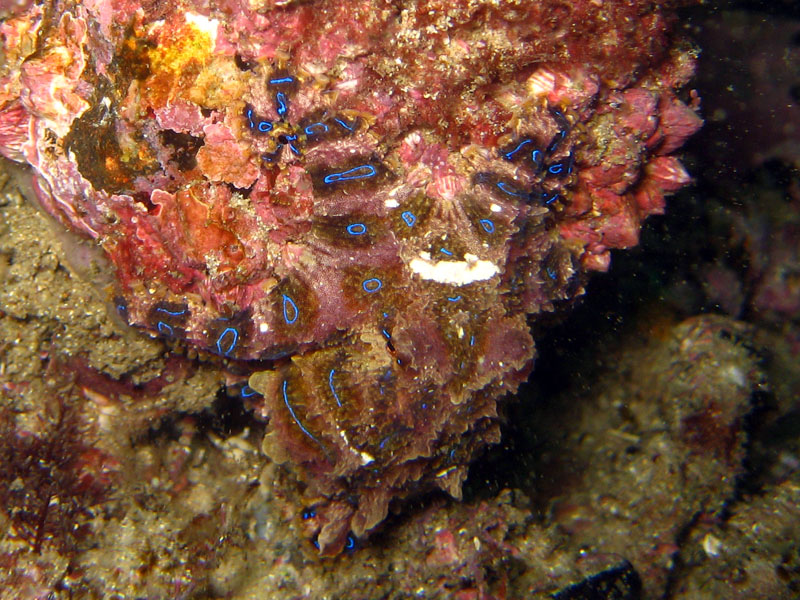
Blue-ringed octopus from New South Wales

The blue ringed octopus (Hapalochlaena maculosa) is only 10 cm long but carries enough tetrodotoxin venom to kill 26 adults, although records indicate it has only killed 3 humans. There is no blue-ringed octopus antivenom available. Very few cases of children being envenomated are reported.

=== Jellyfish ===
Jellyfish stings in Australia can cause death, with there being several venomous species of jellyfish including the box jellyfish and Irukandji jellyfish. Bluebottles are often mistaken for jellyfish but are in fact siphonophores.

==== Bluebottle ====
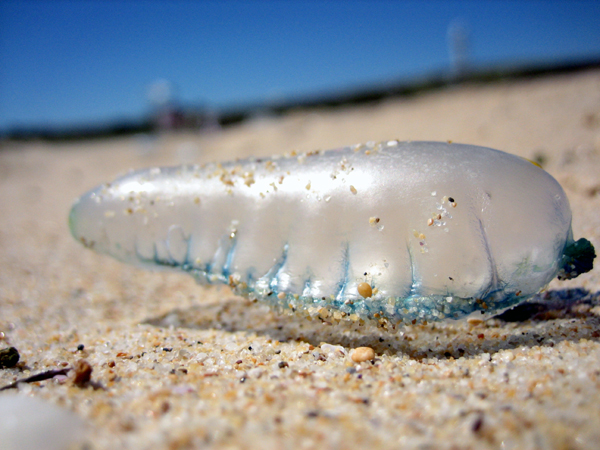
Bluebottle

The Australian bluebottle is Physalia utriculus or Pacific man o'war (not to be confused with Physalia physalis), belongs to the phylum Cnidaria, which includes corals and sea anemones, and stings from it rarely cause death. Outside Australia the other species, Physalia physalis, are known as the "Portuguese man o'war".

The bluebottle is responsible for between 10,000 and 30,000 stings on the eastern coast of Australia each summer, with only around 500 in Western Australia and South Australia combined. In 2006, there were 26,000 stings in New South Wales, with 4,256 in Queensland.

There have only been a few recorded fatalities and none in recent times. In December 1939, a three-year-old boy was stung on the leg while walking in 200 millimetres (8 in) of water at Proserpine. His death was described as the fifth death from a Portuguese man o'war in 32 years. An eleven-year-old male was stung in March 1938 by a bluebottle near Darwin, dying a few minutes after being stung. A nineteen-year-old male was stung in January 1937 by a bluebottle at Branston, near Cairns. He was waist deep in water when stung and after moving 9 metres (30 ft) he collapsed and died. Salvatore Cantarelle, an Italian cane farmer received a fatal sting in December 1934 by a bluebottle at Coogarra Beach, near Tully Another youth also died in January 1930 from a fatal bluebottle sting at Picnic Bay, Magnetic Island, stung while bathing.

==== Box jellyfish ====
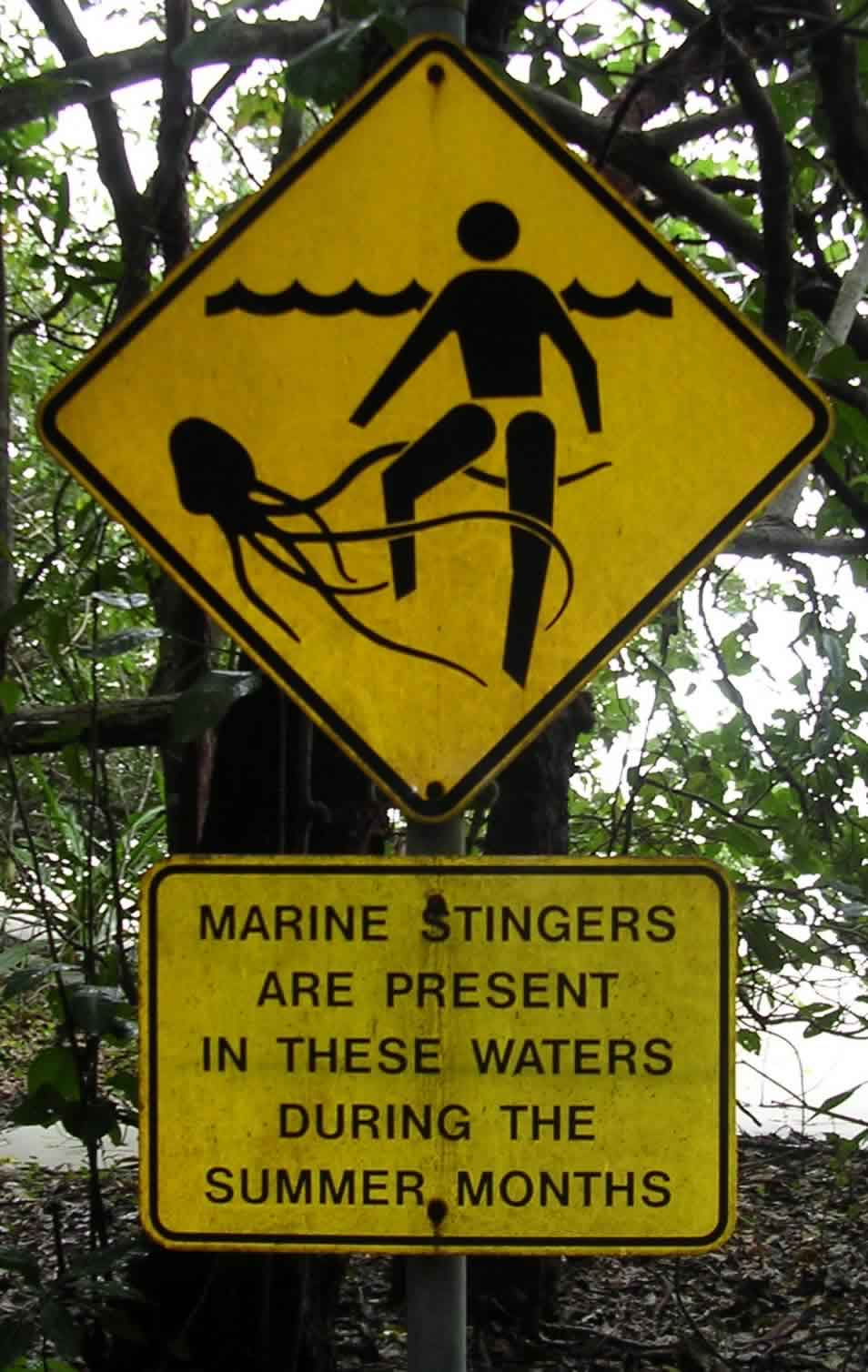
Warning sign at Cape Tribulation, Queensland about the presence of box jellyfish and others.

Box jellyfish (Chironex fleckeri) have caused more than 79 deaths in Australia since records began in the 1880s. Recent fatalities from box jellyfish stings include a 17-year-old boy in March 2021 swimming at a beach near Bamaga on Queensland's western Cape York; a seven-year-old girl in January 2006 at Umagico Beach near Bamaga; a seven-year-old boy in March 2003 near Cairns; and a 44-year-old male in April 2002 at Port Douglas.

==== Irukandji ====
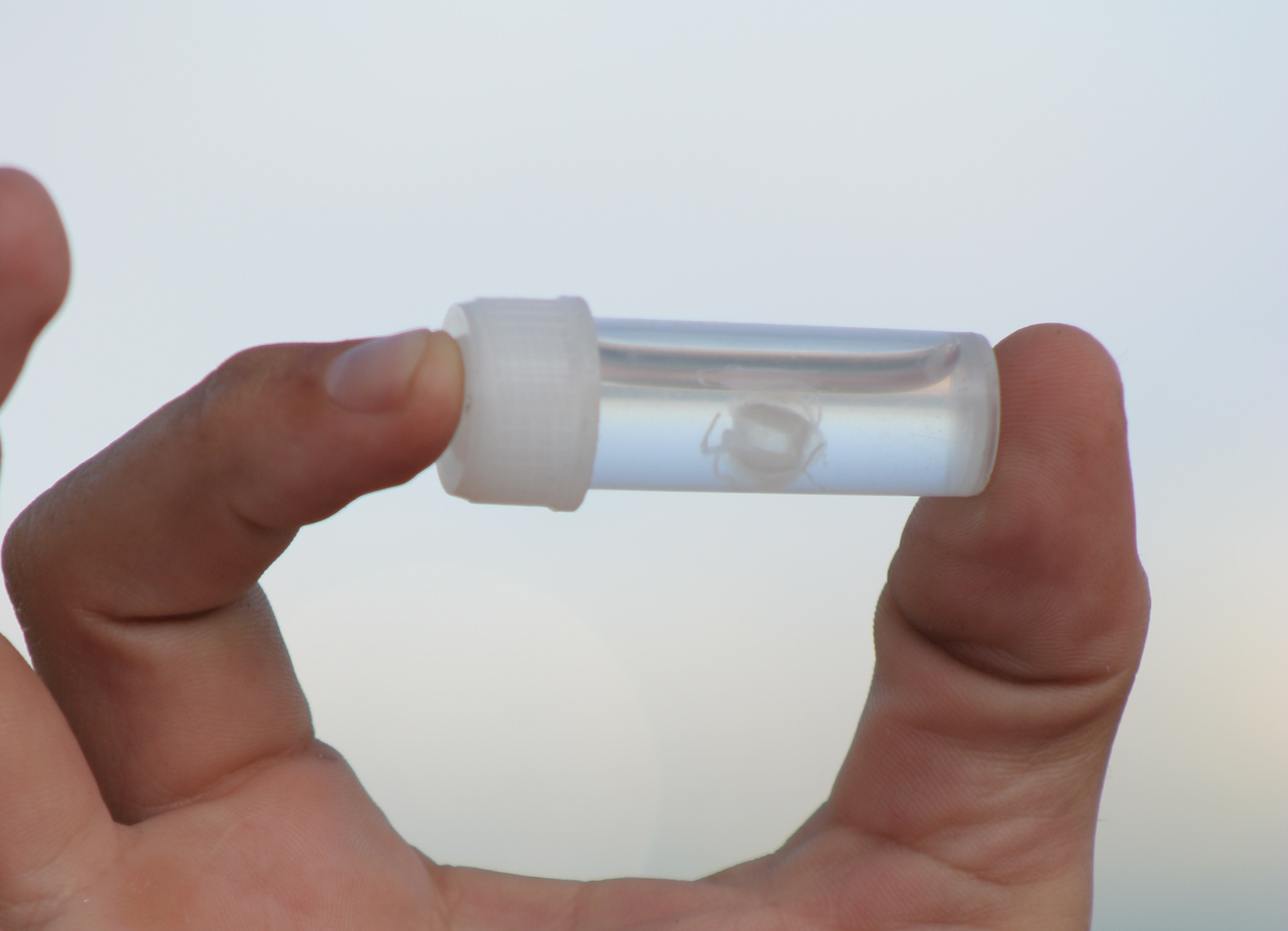
The Irukandji jellyfish is tiny, but very venomous.

Irukandji (Carukia barnesi) are found in Queensland, the Northern Territory and Western Australia.

Between 1985 and 1997 from cases of Irukandji sting where location was recorded, there were 83.4% in Queensland, 9.1% in the Northern Territory, and 7.5% in Western Australia; 81.5% of cases occurred in the afternoon. In a fourteen-year period there were 660 Irukandji stings in Australia, which were recorded by Dr Fenner, a medical officer with Surf Lifesaving Australia. There were 159 Irukandji stings reported in Broome in a five-year period with 25% of those stung being hospitalised but no recorded deaths. There were 62 people reported being stung by Irukandji in Cairns in 1996; of these more than half occurred in December, 92% were stung on hotter than average days, with 63% occurring while swimming inside a stinger net enclosure on the beach. In summer 2001-02 there were 160 people stung by the middle of February, with around 100 of these in Cairns, and between 10 and 20 in Townsville, the Whitsundays, Great Keppel and Agnes Water. In January 2019, 19 people reported being stung in Queensland.

In January 2002 a 58-year-old male was fatally stung at Hamilton Island.

=== Cone shells ===
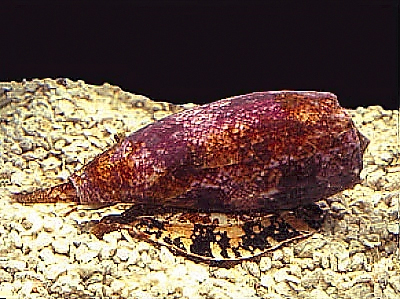
Cone shell

There are around 80 species of cone shell (Conus spp.) in Australian waters, some of which carry highly toxic venom when they are alive. A Conus geographus caused the death of a 27-year-old male in Hayman Island in 1935 after the man handled the cone and its radular tooth pierced his hand, injecting venom; he was unconscious by the time the launch returned to the mainland, and died on reaching the hospital.

=== Crocodiles ===
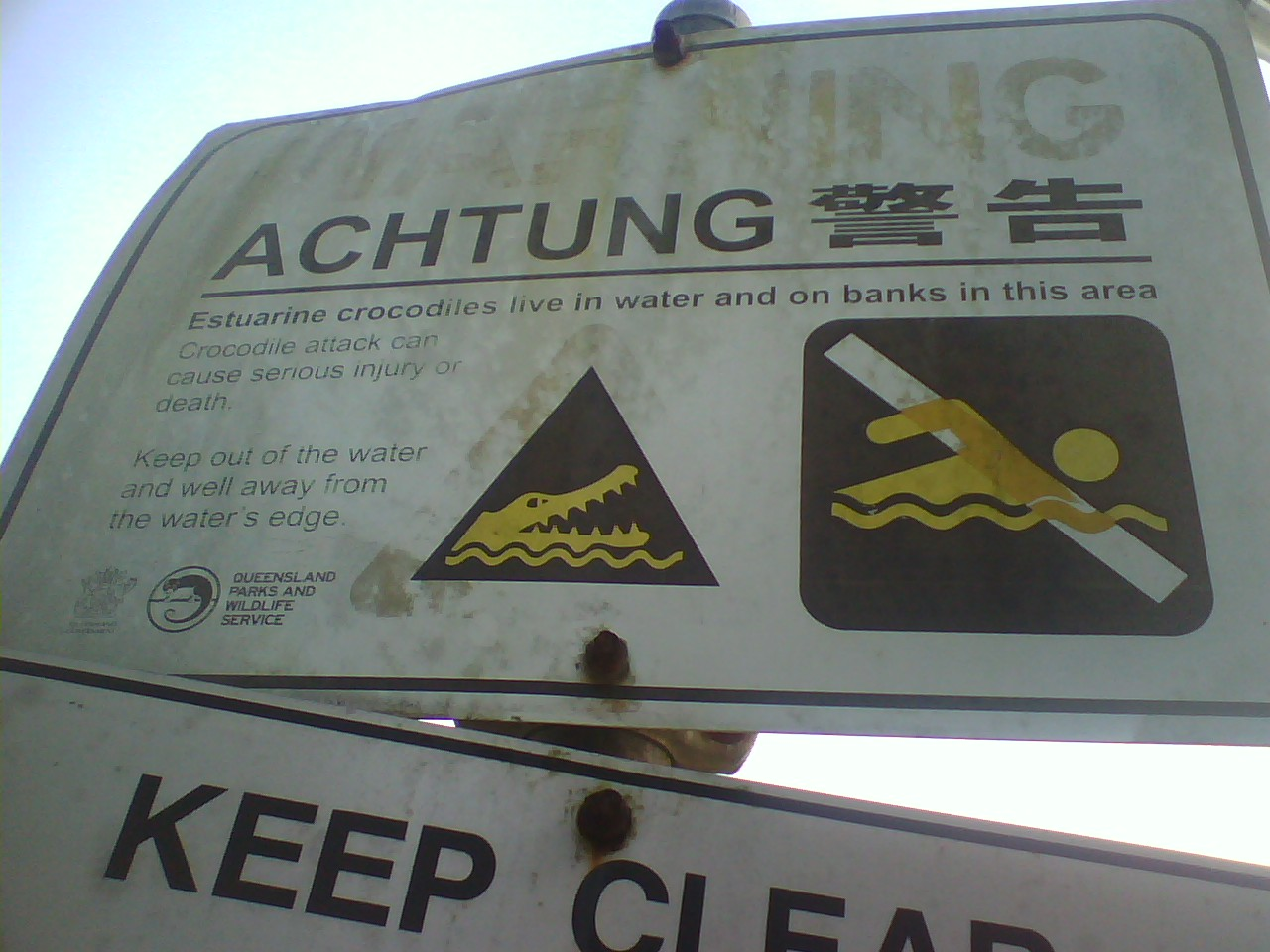
Warning sign on the Daintree River in Queensland about the danger from crocodile attacks.

Crocodile attacks in Australia have occurred in the Northern Territory and Queensland. Nearly all crocodile attacks are caused by the saltwater crocodile, with the freshwater crocodile being smaller and less likely to attack.

Between 1971 and 2004 there were 62 crocodile attacks recorded, 17 of which were fatal. 39 of the attacks were in the Northern Territory (10 fatal), 15 in Queensland (5 fatal) and 8 in Western Australia (2 fatal). Of these attacks, the highest numbers occurred between September and December, although there was at least one in each month. All of the fatal attacks occurred while in water, rather than in a boat or on land.

From June 1981 to June 1991 there were 16 crocodile attacks reported in the Northern Territory, four of which were fatal.

The most recent fatal attacks include the October 2017 death of a grandmother who had gone missing a week prior to her remains and personal belongings being found inside a 4.3-metre crocodile; the January 2017 death of a 47-year-old man killed by a crocodile after attempting to wade across the East Alligator River at Cahills Crossing near Kakadu National Park; and the death of 35-year-old Warren Hughes in March 2017 who was found two days after the spearfisherman's dinghy and speargun were discovered off Palmer Point, north of Innisfail, where investigations pointed to him being taken by a 4m crocodile. On 29 May 2016, 46-year-old Cindy Waldron was killed when she was dragged underwater during a late-night swim with a friend, who tried in vain to save her, at Thornton Beach in the Daintree National Park. On 17 May 2016, 75-year-old Noel Ramage drowned when a crocodile capsized his boat at Leaders Creek, Northern Territory. In August 2014, 57-year-old Tran Van Lanh was taken by a crocodile on the Adelaide River when he waded into the water to free a fishing lure from a snag. In June 2014, 62-year-old fisherman Bill Scott was killed in front of his family by a 4.7 metre crocodile while on his boat in the Kakadu National Park. In January 2014 a 12-year-old indigenous boy was killed while swimming at Jabiru, Northern Territory. In August 2013 26-year-old Sean Cole was killed while racing a mate across the Mary River, 100 km from Darwin. An eleven-year-old girl was killed in 2009 in the Northern Territory; a five-year-old boy killed on 8 February 2009 in Queensland by a 4.3 metre crocodile; a 62-year-old man in September 2008 in Queensland while checking crab pots; a 37-year-old Canadian mine worker on 24 September 2005 at Picnic Beach, south of Umbakumba, who disappeared while snorkelling; a 22-year-old male in December 2003 at the Finniss River, 80 km SW of Darwin; and a 23-year-old female German tourist in 2002 at Kakadu, while swimming in a water hole. In February 2021 human remains were found inside the stomach of a 14-foot-long (4.2 meters) crocodile on Hinchinbrook Island, Queensland, which local authorities believed to likely belong to Andrew Heard, a 69-year-old fisherman who went missing from the area on 11 February (a second, 3m crocodile was also killed and examined).

Recent non-fatal attacks include a 60-year-old man who had been fishing on the banks of the McIvor River, near Hope Vale (Cape York, Queensland) who escaped the jaws of a crocodile by stabbing it in the head with a pocket knife as it dragged him into the river. A 32-year-old man was injured after a 5m crocodile jumped out of the water into his boat in Kakadu National Park on 24 April 2021. In January 2021 a 44-year-old man survived an attack from a 1.5m to 2m (4.9 ft to 6.5 ft) crocodile in Lake Placid, Queensland, by prising the crocodile's jaws from his head. on 7 May 2017 a 54-year-old man from the remote community of Palumpa was attacked by a 2m crocodile near the Daly River, suffering puncture wounds to his arm and chest. On 25 April 2016 a crocodile tried to drag 19-year-old Peter Rowsell from a tent by his foot at Palm Creek, in the Douglas Daly region of the Northern Territory. On 16 May 2015 29-year-old kitesurfer Chris Keeping fought off repeated attacks by a crocodile at Casuarina Coastal Reserve's Lee Point near Darwin. In April 2013 29-year-old Frenchman Yoann Galeran survived an attack at Nhulunbuy in Arnhem Land.

In Darwin Harbour, rangers routinely catch up to 300 crocodiles per year as part of a program designed to reduce the risk of fatal attacks. In November 2021, Banjo the Staffordshire bull terrier was attacked in the harbour by a crocodile estimated to be 2 to 3m long.

In 2022 Steve Irwin's son Robert was nearly attacked by a 12-foot crocodile while filming a television segment.

=== Sharks ===
Shark nets have been used to help prevent shark attacks.

The Australian Shark Attack File has recorded that since 1791 there have been 639 shark attacks in Australia with 190 of them being fatal. Since shark netting began in 1937, the number of deaths from sharks on beaches has been reduced in New South Wales, with only one fatal attack on a netted beach during that time. In Queensland there has not been a fatal attack on a netted beach since nets were introduced in the 1960s. There has been an average of 20 shark attacks per year since 2010.

The Australian Department of the Environment, Water, Heritage and the Arts states precautions which can be taken to reduce the risk of shark attacks. These include avoiding swimming far from the shore, at the mouth of a river or on drop-offs to deeper water; avoiding swimming in dirty water, swimming alone or with domestic animals, near people fishing, not swimming at dusk or at night, and to leave the water if schools of fish behave erratically or group in large numbers.

Four species of sharks account for the vast majority of fatal attacks on humans: the bull shark, tiger shark, oceanic whitetip shark and the great white shark.

=== Stingrays ===
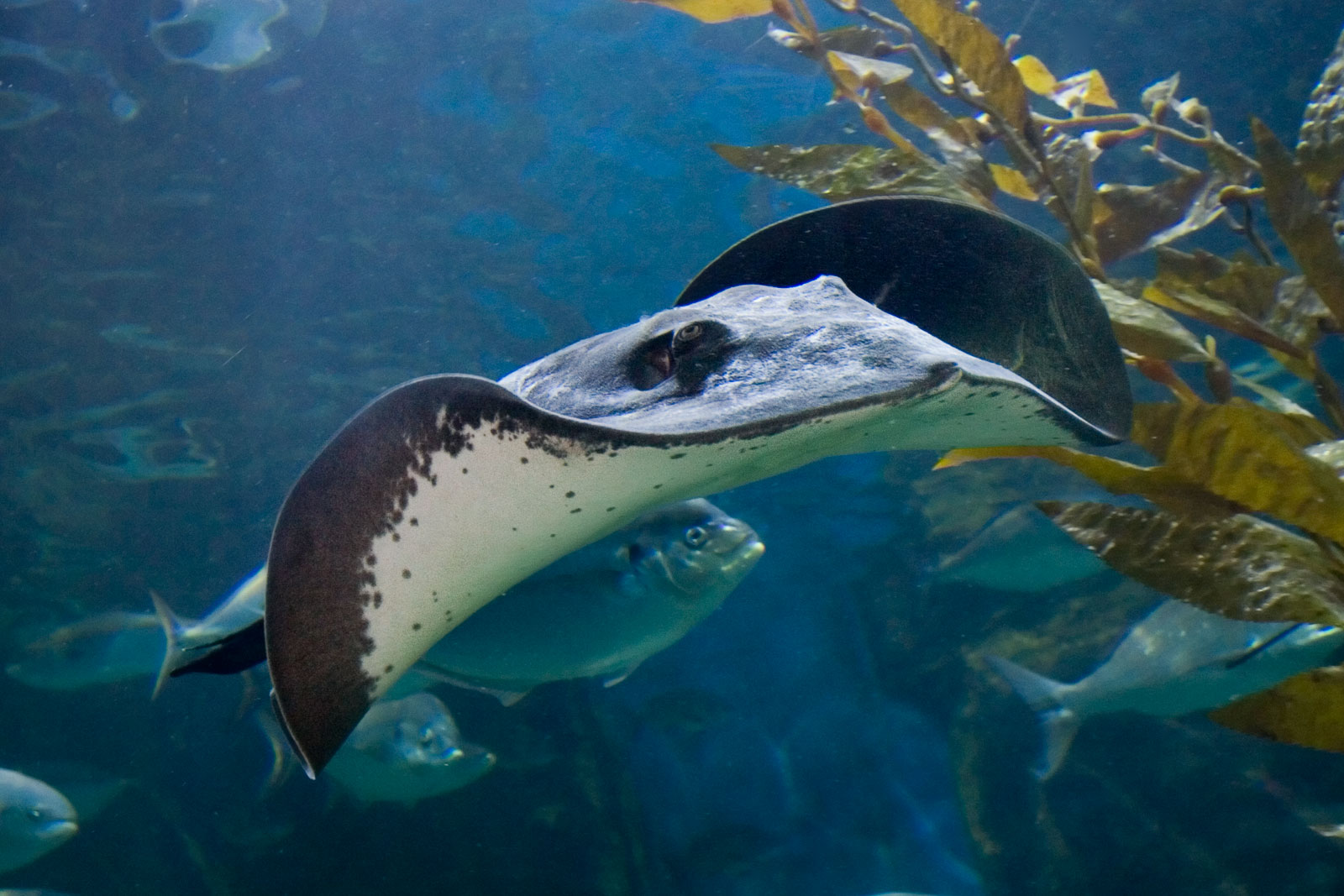
Stingray

Stingray attacks in Australia usually cause minor cuts but have very occasionally led to deaths. There have been four recorded fatalities from stingray attacks in Australia. On 4 September 2006 Steve Irwin died from a stingray attack at Batt Reef near Port Douglas A twelve-year-old boy in 1988, who was hit by stingray jumping from the water, died six days later due to poison from the barb. Luigi Deguisto in June 1953 died at Werribee after a stingray punctured his thigh, piercing a vein. Sergeant Arthur Biggins died on 9 January 1945 at St Kilda Baths after a stingray wounded him in the heart. A 1938 death from a stingray attack of an 18-year-old girl in Auckland, New Zealand has sometimes been wrongly attributed as having happened in Australia.

=== Stonefish ===
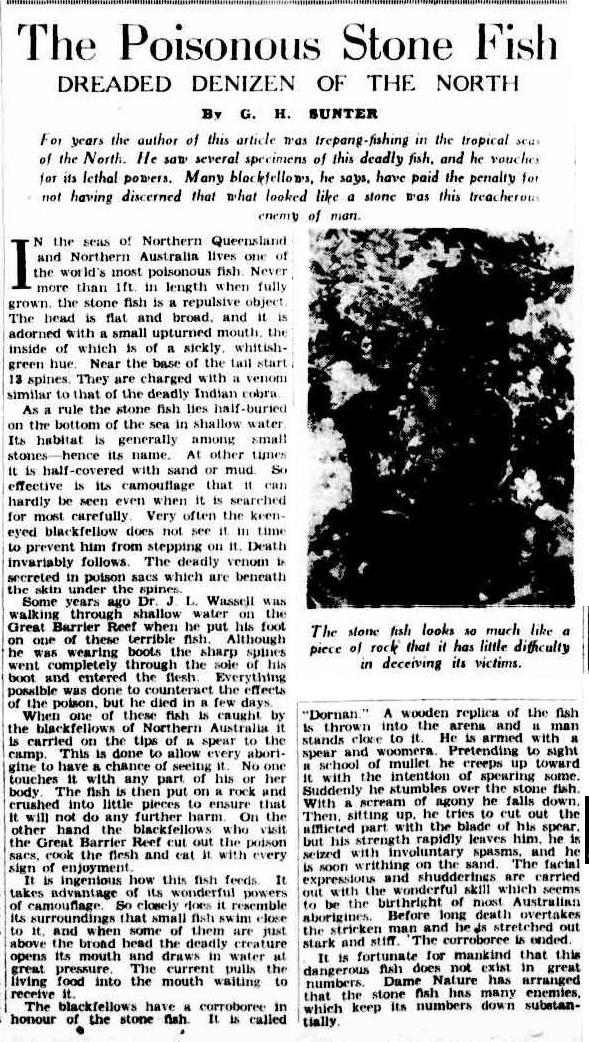
1936 article from Melbourne newspaper The Argus about venomous stonefish.

Stonefish venom causes severe pain, poisoning and can cause death if not treated. The stonefish is the most venomous fish in the world. The stonefish has venom in its dorsal spines; when stepped on by a human, the venom is forced into the foot. Most stonefish stings occur when stepped on, it is less common for stings when the fish is picked up. Stonefish stings can occur on the beach, not just in the water, with stonefish being able to stay out of the water for up to 24 hours. They often cannot be seen easily as they look similar to rocks or coral. Stonefish antivenom is the second most administered in Australia. Aborigines knew of the venom of the stonefish and had corroborees which involve re-enacting death from someone who trod on the fish. The Aborigines of Northern Australia and the Great Barrier Reef had different ways of preparing the fish for eating to avoid poisoning. After stonefish poisoning, the amount of antivenom given depends on the number of puncture wounds from the stonefish spines. There were 25 cases of the use of antivenom for stonefish reported to Commonwealth Serum Laboratories for a one-year period between July 1989 and June 1990, with most from Queensland and four from the Northern Territory. There were 14 calls to the Queensland Poisons Information System in 2008 regarding stonefish poison Fatalities have included Dr J.L. Wassell "some years" before 1936 from a stonefish sting at the Great Barrier Reef, and in 1915 a fatal stonefish sting recorded at Thursday Island.

== Unique and other cases ==
Most animals will defend themselves if in danger. Animals in which an attack on humans has occurred only in extreme circumstances or when provoked include:

- Buffalo – believed to have killed a 46-year-old man in 2005
- Corella – many entered the town of Stawell and caused problems in 2004.
- Eagle – Two wedge tailed eagles attacked a woman who was paragliding in championships at Killarney, Queensland in 2007.
- Echidna – Girl who tried to rescue an echidna from a drain in Moe had her arm trapped by its quills and she had to be rescued.
- Grouper – Swedish scuba diver attacked by one on the Great Barrier Reef in 2002.
- Koala – Thieves received scratches and lacerations when they unsuccessfully tried to steal one at the Rockhampton zoo.
- Platypus – There are a few cases of people being envenomated with platypus venom, including in 1992 and 1994.
- Possum – A day care centre out on a field trip was attacked by a group of possums in the Oxford Falls suburb of Sydney, 1994. A family was also attacked by one in the Warrnambool suburb of Dennington in 2008.
- Sea lion – 13-year-old girl attacked by a sea lion while surfing at Lancelin in 2007.
- Sea snake – 2-year-old girl bitten by an Astrotia stokesii in Yeppoon. There have been some other cases but no fatalities in Australia.
- Tasmanian devil – It was reported in 1899 that: "many ghastly stories were afloat of their attacks upon escaped convicts who had taken to the bush."
- Wallaby – Several attacks occurred in 2008 at White Rock, near Cairns.
- Whale — A man was crushed when a whale surfaced and landed on his boat.

There are also domestic animals common to most places which can attack humans such as domestic dogs, cats etc. It was estimated in 1991 there were up to 30,000 people going to hospital annually because of domestic dog attacks in Australia. Other insects can also cause fatalities, such as wasps and bees. There have also been deaths due to mosquito-borne diseases such as malaria (now eradicated).

== See also ==
- Fauna of Australia
- Animal attacks in Latin America
- List of fatal snake bites in Australia
