= Harry Wallis Kew =

British amateur zoologist

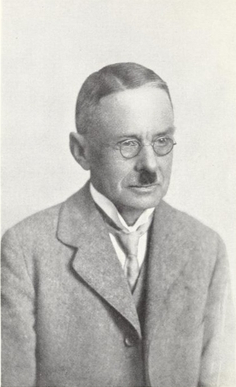
- Kew in c.1930
- Born: 1868; Louth, Lincolnshire, England
- Died: 1948 (aged 79–80)
- Known for: Work on pseudoscorpions and molluscs
- Scientific career
- Fields: Zoology

Harry Wallis Kew FZS (1868–1948) was an amateur English zoologist.

Wallis Kew worked as a bank clerk in Kent and devoted his free time to the study of pseudoscorpions and molluscs. He is best remembered for his book entitled The dispersal of shells; an inquiry into the means of dispersal possessed by fresh-water and land Mollusc, which included a preface by Alfred Russel Wallace. In this work, Wallis Kew was tracking the phenomena that is now referred to as invasive species in relation to molluscs, and in particular the zebra mussel.

Wallis Kew was the grandson of woodcarver, Thomas Wilkinson Wallis, and in 1884 founded the Louth Naturalists’, Antiquarian and Literary Society. He was a member of the Lincolnshire Naturalists' Union from 1910 and served as its president in 1927.

The gastropod Ameranella kewi (Dickerson, 1915) and the pseudoscorpions Hansenius kewi (Ellingsen, 1907), Beierius walliskewi (Ellingsen, 1912) and Ephippiochthonius kewi (Gabbutt, 1966) were named in his honour, as well as the pseudoscorpion genus Kewochthonius Chamberlin, 1929.

== Works ==
- 1893 The dispersal of shells; an inquiry into the means of dispersal possessed by fresh-water and land Mollusc
- 1901 Lincolnshire Pseudoscorpions: With an Account of the Associations of Such Animals with Other Arthropods
- 1911 A Synopsis of the False-scorpions of Britain and Ireland
- 1912 On the Pairing of Pseudoscorpiones
- 1914 On the Nests of Pseudoscorpiones: With Historical Notes on the Spinning Organs and Observations on the Building and Spinning of the Nests
- 1932 Thomas Johnson, Botanist and Royalist, Etc.
