= Cahills Crossing =

Low level causeway (road river crossing) in Northern Territory

Cahills Crossing Arnhem Highway/Oenpelli Rd Northern Territory
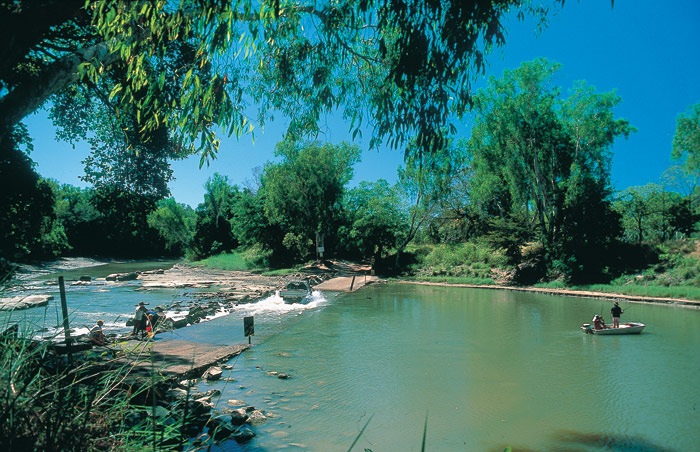
- Aerial view of Cahills Crossing
- Coordinates: 12°14′22″S 132°24′11″E

General information
- Type: Track
- Length: 150 m (500 ft)
- Opened: 1956

Restrictions
- General: Seasonal closures, 4WD
- Permits: required

Cahills Crossing (also known as Kamum Injdjinakka or the East Alligator River crossing) is a low-level causeway over the East Alligator River in Kakadu National Park. It is about 3.5 hours east of Darwin by road and around 30 minutes from Jabiru. It is the major road link between Kakadu and West Arnhem Land. Access to the crossing requires the appropriate permits because both Kakadu and Arnhem Land are Indigenous regions.

== Naming history ==
Cahills Crossing is named after Patrick ‘Paddy’ Cahill a farmer who established a settlement at Oenpelli in Kakadu on the East Alligator River in 1906, and who was an ally of local aborigines.

The East Alligator River is a misnomer, named by English navigator Phillip Parker King in 1818 who viewed numerous crocodiles but was only familiar with their cousin species the alligator. When the error was realised it was not corrected because it had been gazetted and it was thought to be too difficult to rename.

== Crocodile viewing ==
The crossing is famous for the large numbers of saltwater (estuarine) crocodiles, which gather around the causeway to feed on fish such as mullet and barramundi. There is now a Cahills Crossing viewing area which is considered a safe place to observe crocodiles from the designated platforms on the western bank (Kakadu side). Crocodile viewing is also available from cruises on the East Alligator river.

The best time of year to see crocodiles is generally during the late dry season, from July to October, with activity approximately peaking in September. During this period, crocodile numbers increase as surrounding floodplains dry out and fish become concentrated in the river. It is also safest to cross in a 4WD/elevated vehicle in the dry season as the crossing is least likely to be flooded. Passage is often closed in the wet (monsoon) season in summer and early autumn.

== Danger ==
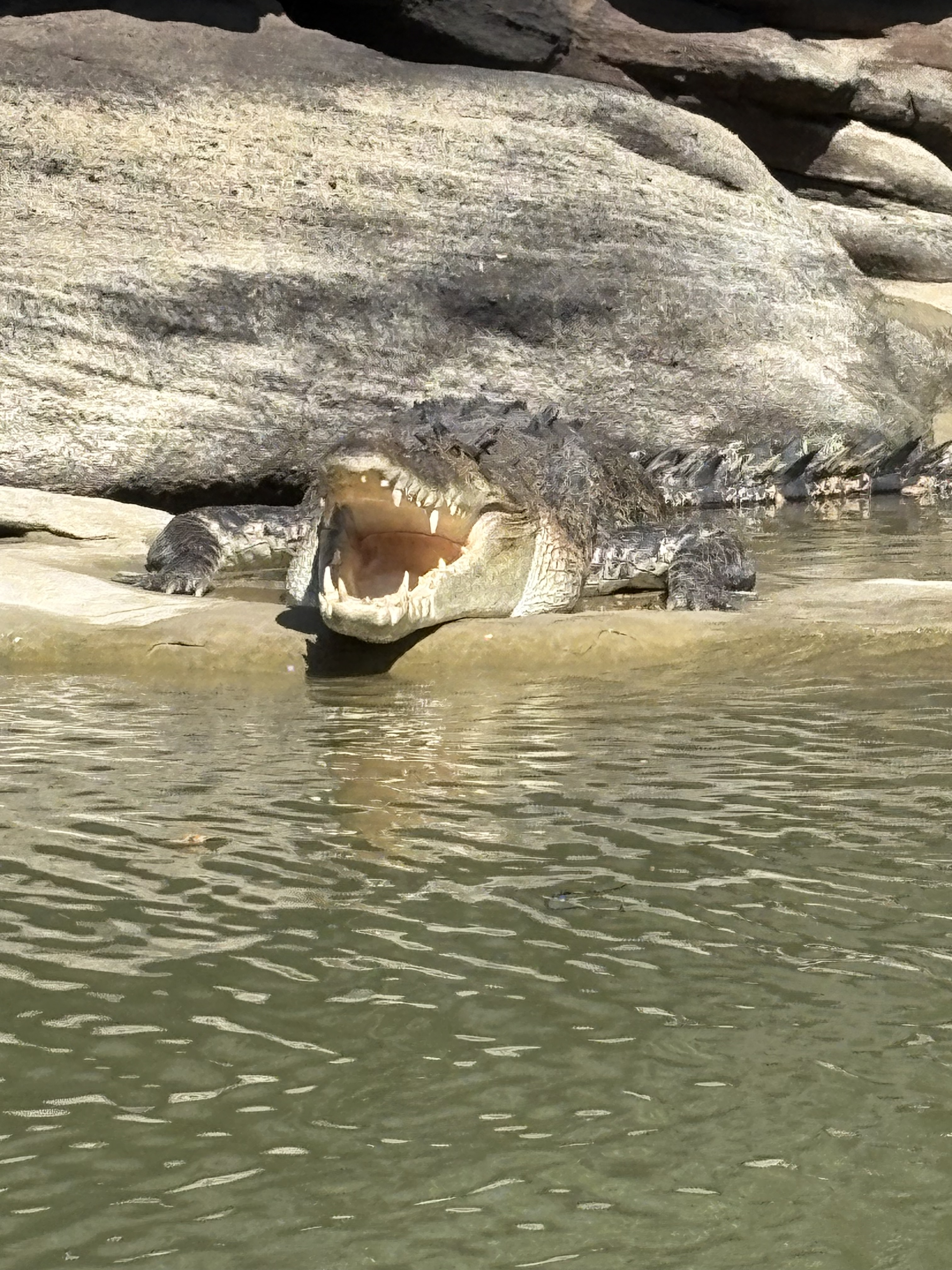
Crocodile on the bank of the East Alligator River just south of Cahills Crossing

Cahills Crossing is known for being dangerous from the perspective of both tides and crocodiles. It has been described as the most dangerous causeway in Australia. It is highly tidal despite being well inland, and fast-flowing water can make the causeway unsafe or impassable, particularly around high tide or in the wet season. Visitors should check tide times and official road conditions before travelling, use the viewing platforms, stay well back from the water, and never cross the causeway on foot.

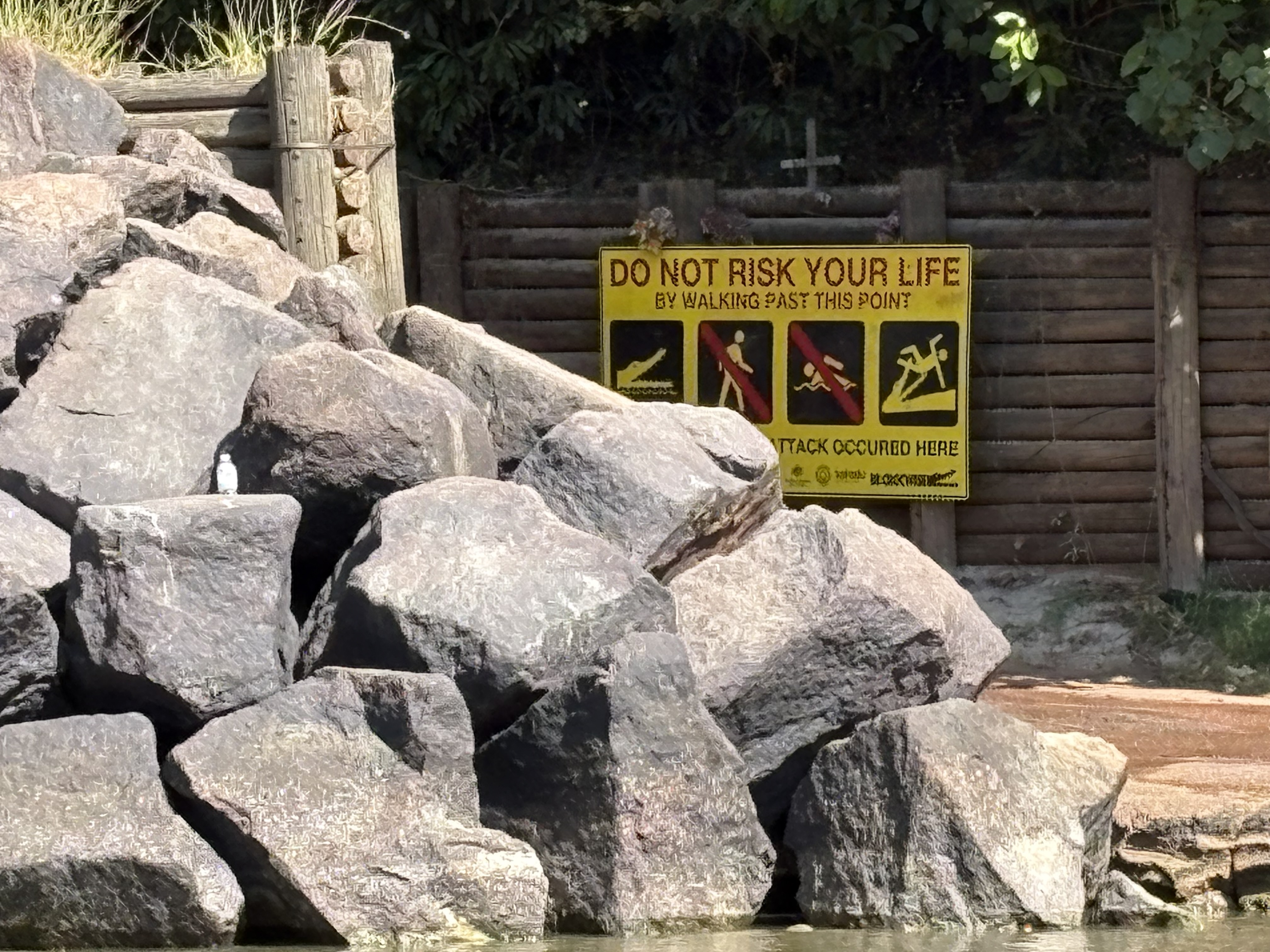
Warning to not cross the East Alligator River on foot

=== Deaths ===
The crossing is well known for vehicles being overturned trying to cross deep water. Despite numerous and regular close calls, only two people have been known or confirmed to have been killed by crocodiles. In 1987, a 40-year-old fisherman was attacked and killed while standing in the water. In 2017, a 47-year-old man was killed by a crocodile after attempting to walk across the flooded crossing.

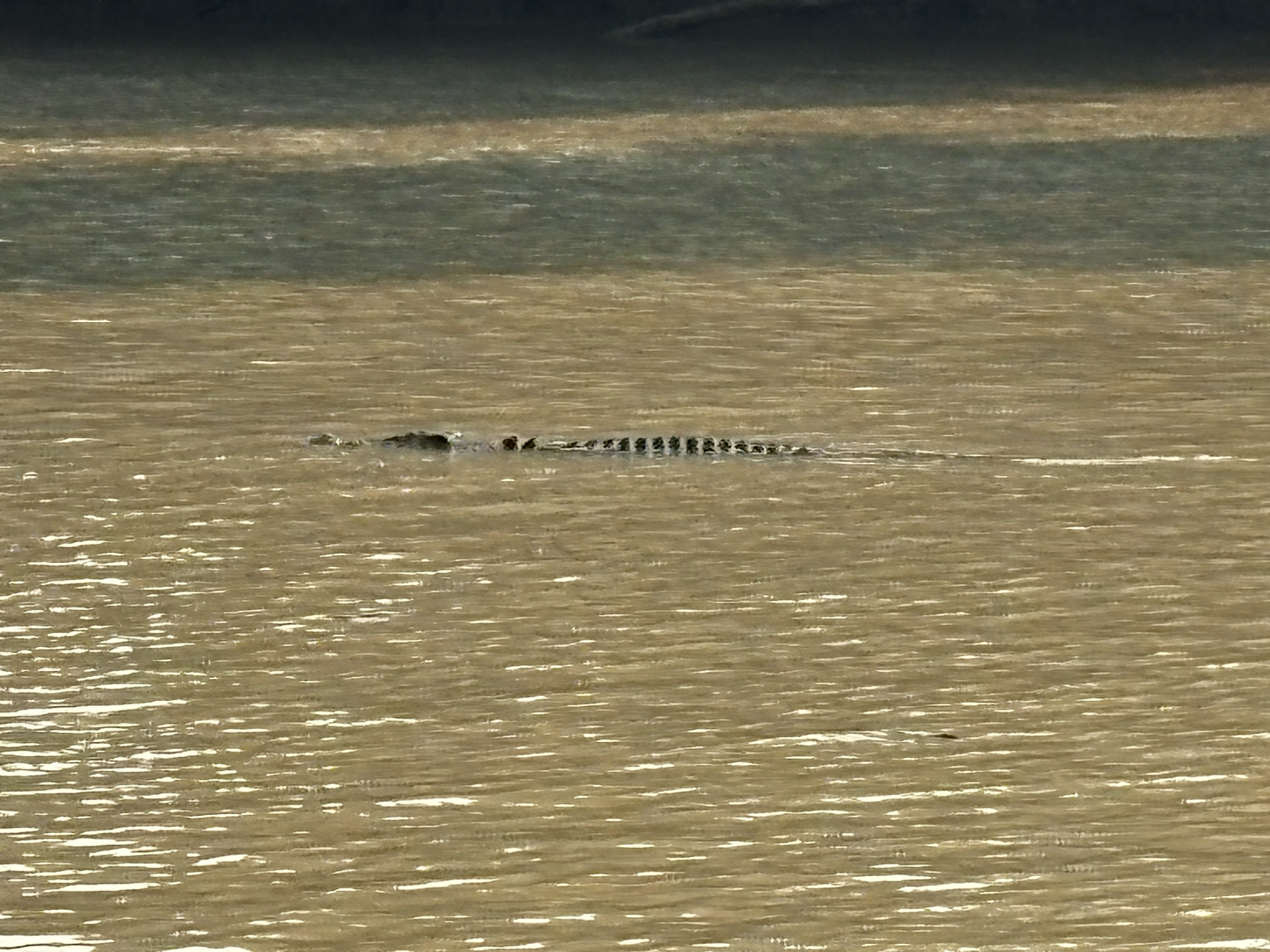
Crocodile in the water at Cahills Crossing
