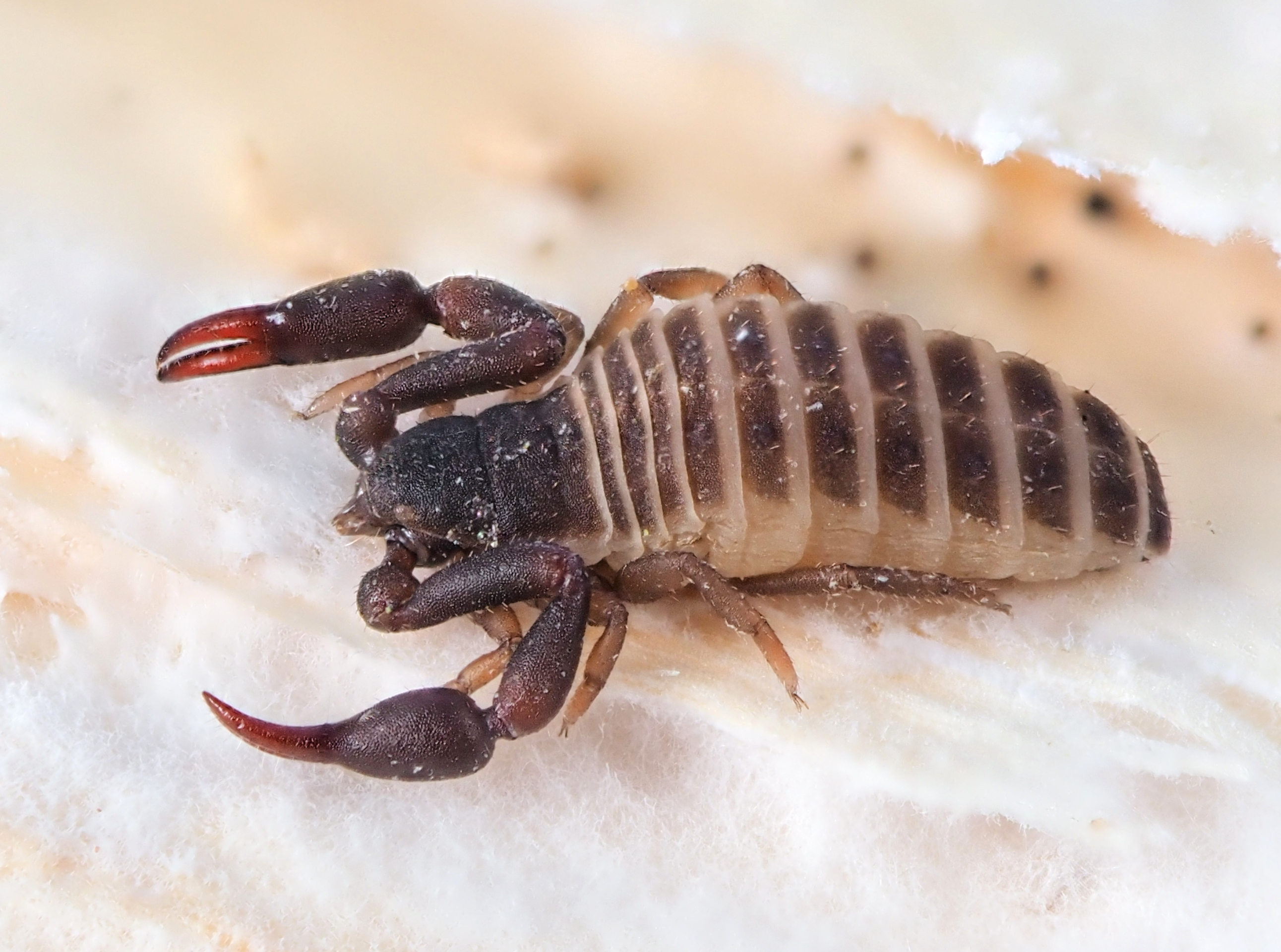
- Withius piger

Scientific classification
- Kingdom: Animalia
- Phylum: Arthropoda
- Subphylum: Chelicerata
- Class: Arachnida
- Order: Pseudoscorpiones
- Family: Withiidae; Chamberlin, 1931

= Withiidae =

Family of arachnids

Withiidae is a family of pseudoscorpions, first described by Joseph Conrad Chamberlin in 1931.

== Genera ==
As of October 2023, the World Pseudoscorpiones Catalog accepts the following thirty-seven genera:

- Aisthetowithius Beier, 1967
- Balanowithius Beier, 1959
- Cacodemonius Chamberlin, 1931
- Cryptowithius Beier, 1967
- Cyrtowithius Beier, 1955
- Cystowithius Harvey, 2004
- Dolichowithius Chamberlin, 1931
- Ectromachernes Beier, 1944
- Girardwithius Heurtault, 1994
- Juxtachelifer Hoff, 1956
- Metawithius Chamberlin, 1931
- Microwithius Redikorzev, 1938
- Nannowithius Beier, 1932
- Neowithius Beier, 1932
- Nesowithius Beier, 1940
- Paragoniochernes Beier, 1932
- Parallowithius Beier, 1955
- Parawithius Chamberlin, 1931
- Plesiowithius Vachon, 1954
- Pogonowithius Beier, 1979
- Protowithius Beier, 1955
- Pseudatemnus Beier, 1947
- Pseudochernes Beier, 1954
- Pycnowithius Beier, 1979
- Rexwithius Heurtault, 1994
- Rugowithius Harvey, 2015
- Scotowithius Beier, 1977
- Sphaerowithius Mahnert, 1988
- Sphallowithius Beier, 1977
- Stenowithius Beier, 1932
- Termitowithius Muchmore, 1990
- Thaumatowithius Beier, 1940
- Trichotowithius Beier, 1944
- Tropidowithius Beier, 1955
- Victorwithius Feio, 1944
- Withius Kew, 1911
- †Beierowithius Mahnert, 1979
